= Wolseley Motors =

British motor car company (1901–1975)

Wolseley Motors Limited
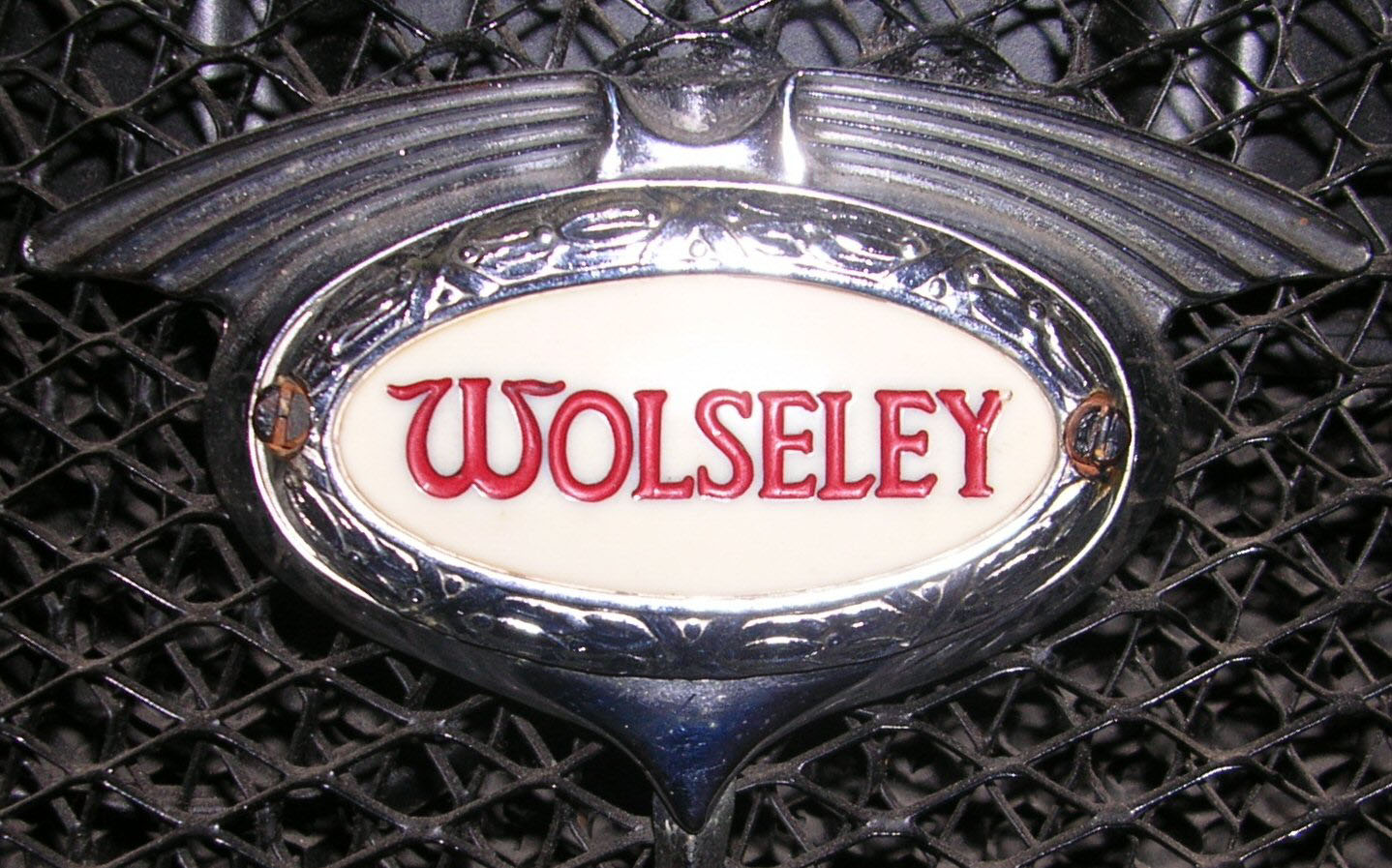
- Industry: Automotive
- Founded: 1901
- Defunct: 1975
- Fate: Merged
- Successor: British Motor Corporation
- Headquarters: Birmingham, England, UK
- Key people: Thomas and Albert Vickers; Herbert Austin; J D Siddeley; A J McCormack; W R Morris

Wolseley marque
- Product type: Automotive marque
- Current owner: SAIC Motor
- Discontinued: 1975
- Previous owners: Vickers, Sons and Maxim (1901–1927); W R Morris (1927–1935); Morris Motors Limited (1935–1952); BMC (1952–1968); British Leyland (1968–1986); Rover Group (1986–1988); BAe (1988–1994); BMW (1994–2000); MG Rover (2000–2005); NAC (2005–2007)

Wolseley Motors Limited was a British motor vehicle manufacturer founded in early 1901 by the Vickers Armaments in conjunction with Herbert Austin. It initially made a full range, topped by large luxury cars, and dominated the market in the Edwardian era. The Vickers brothers died in 1914 and 1919, respectively, (Note: in 1914 and 1919 respectively) and, without their guidance, Wolseley expanded rapidly after the war, manufacturing 12,000 cars in 1921, and remained the biggest motor manufacturer in Britain.

In 1927, it was acquired by William Morris from Vickers Limited as a personal investment. Over-expansion led to receivership. He moved it into his Morris Motors empire just before World War II. After that, Wolseley products were "badge-engineered" Morris cars. Wolseley went with its sister businesses into BMC, BMH, and British Leyland, where its name lapsed in 1975.

== Founding 1901 ==
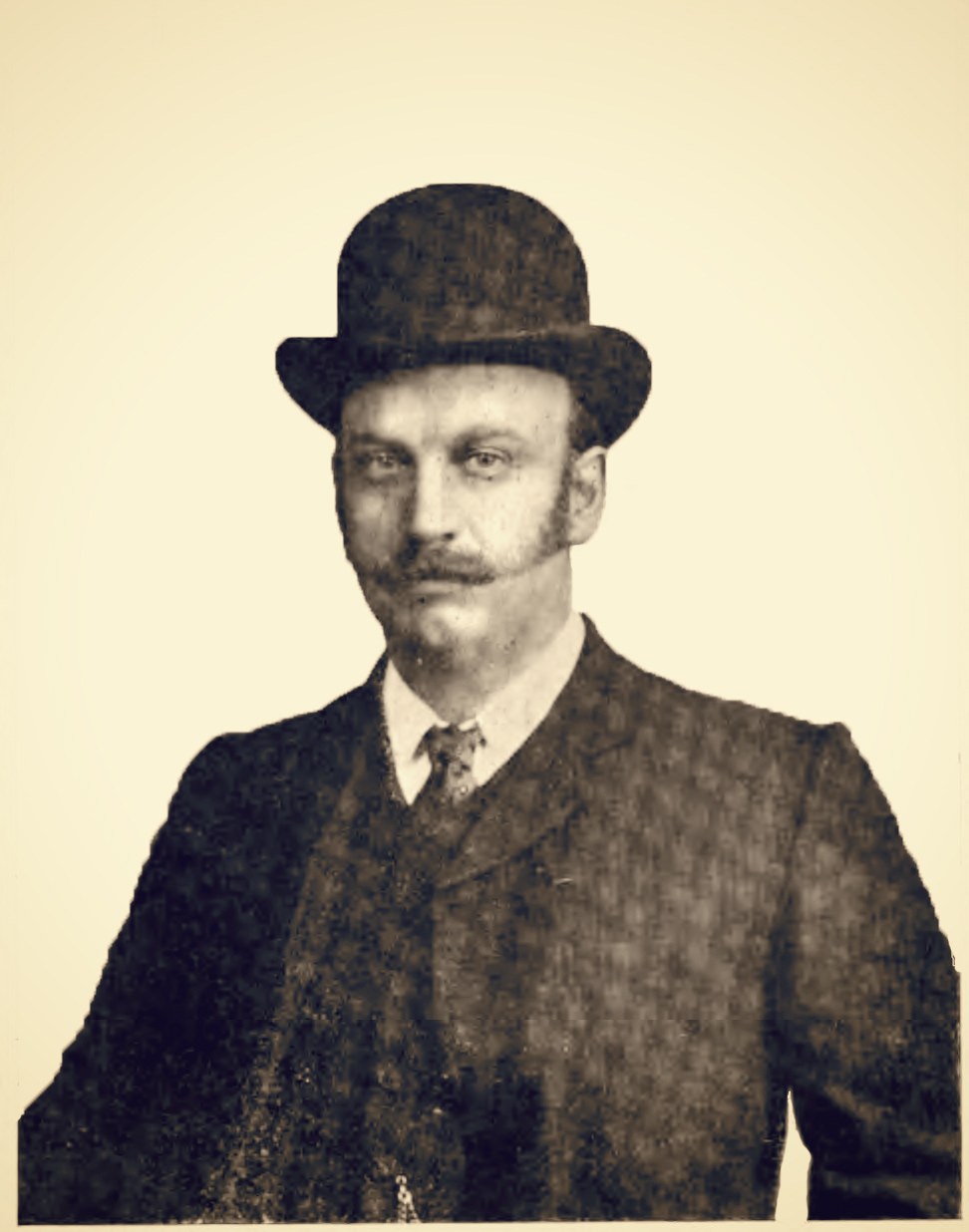
Herbert Austin (1866–1941) in 1905

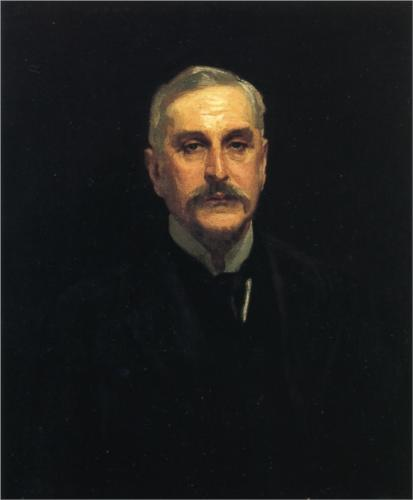
Colonel Thomas Vickers (1833–1915)

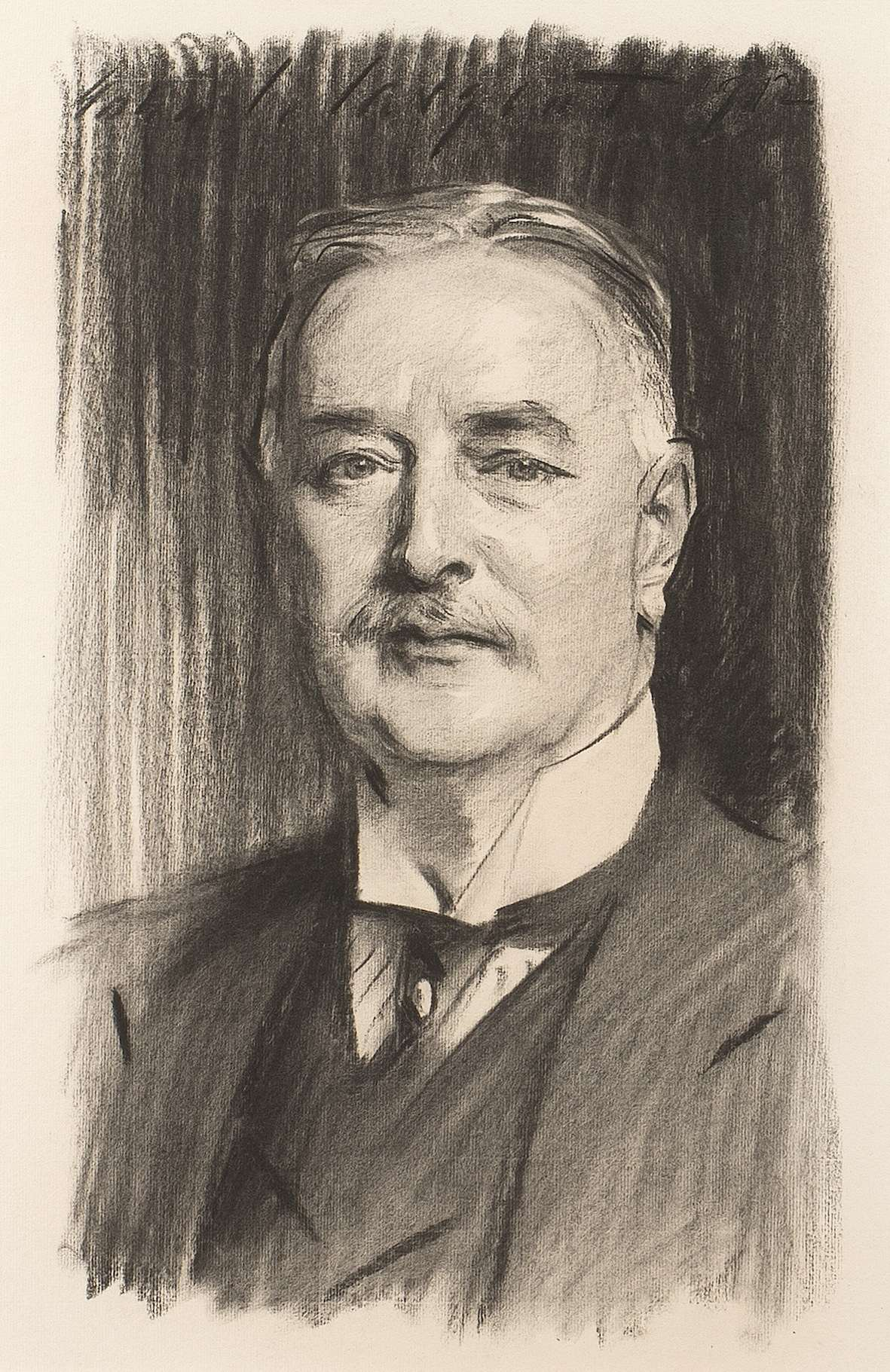
Albert Vickers (1838–1919)

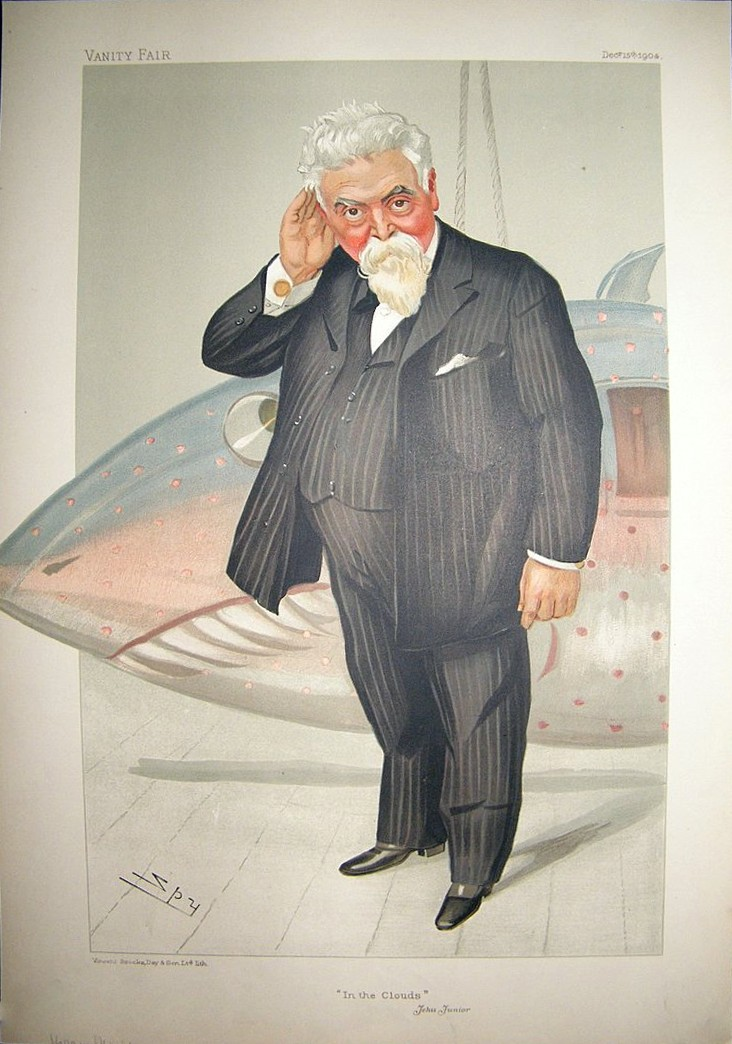
Sir Hiram Maxim
(1840–1916) caricature by Spy for Vanity Fair, 1904

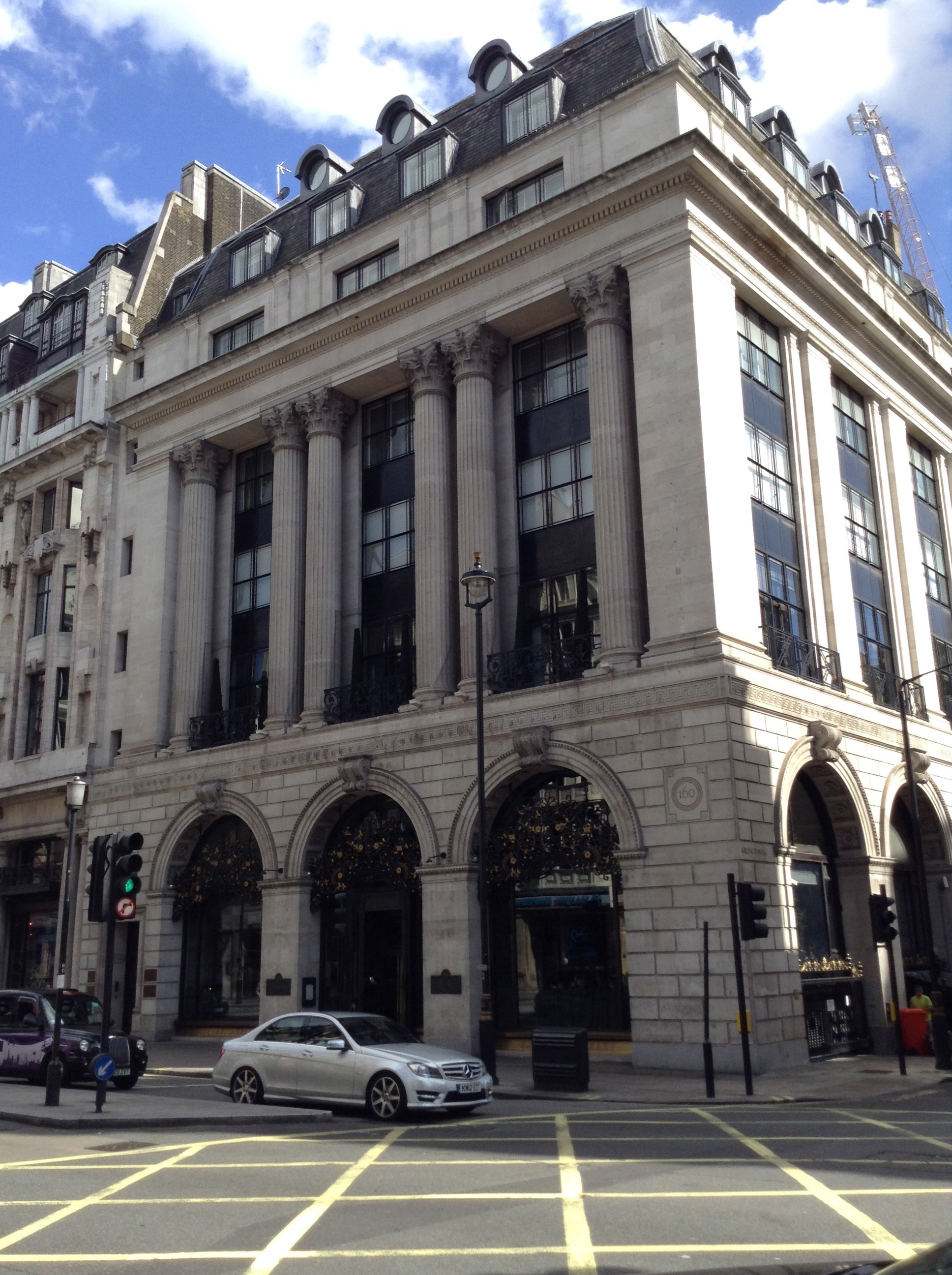
Piccadilly regional offices, completed 1921

=== The Wolseley Tool and Motor Car Company Limited ===
Hiram Maxim, inventor of the machine gun that bears his name, and by then a member of the combine Vickers Sons & Maxim, had consulted Herbert Austin at The Wolseley Sheep Shearing Machine Company Limited in the late 1890s a number of times in relation to the design of flying machines, which Maxim was developing and constructing. Maxim made use of a number of suggestions made by Austin in Maxim's activities at his works in Crayford, Kent. Once the sheep shearing company had decided they would not pursue their automobile interest, an approach was made and agreement quickly reached.

The Wolseley Tool and Motor Car Company of Adderley Park Birmingham was incorporated in March 1901 with a capital of £40,000 by Vickers, Sons and Maxim to manufacture motor cars and machine tools. The managing director was Herbert Austin. The cars and the Wolseley name came from Austin's exploratory venture for The Wolseley Sheep Shearing Machine Company Limited, run since the early 1890s by the now 33-year-old Austin. Wolseley's board had decided not to enter the business and Maxim and the Vickers brothers picked it up. After his five-year contract with The Wolseley Tool and Motor Car Company ended Austin founded The Austin Motor Company Limited.

==== Austin's Wolseley cars ====
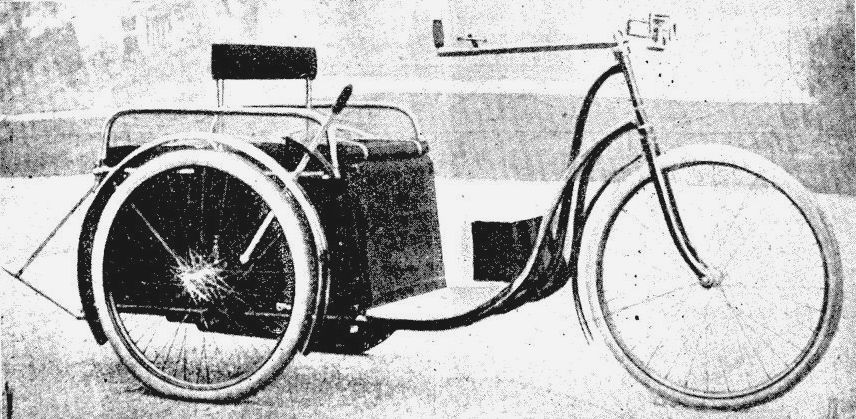
Wolseley Tricycle (1896) 2-cylinder

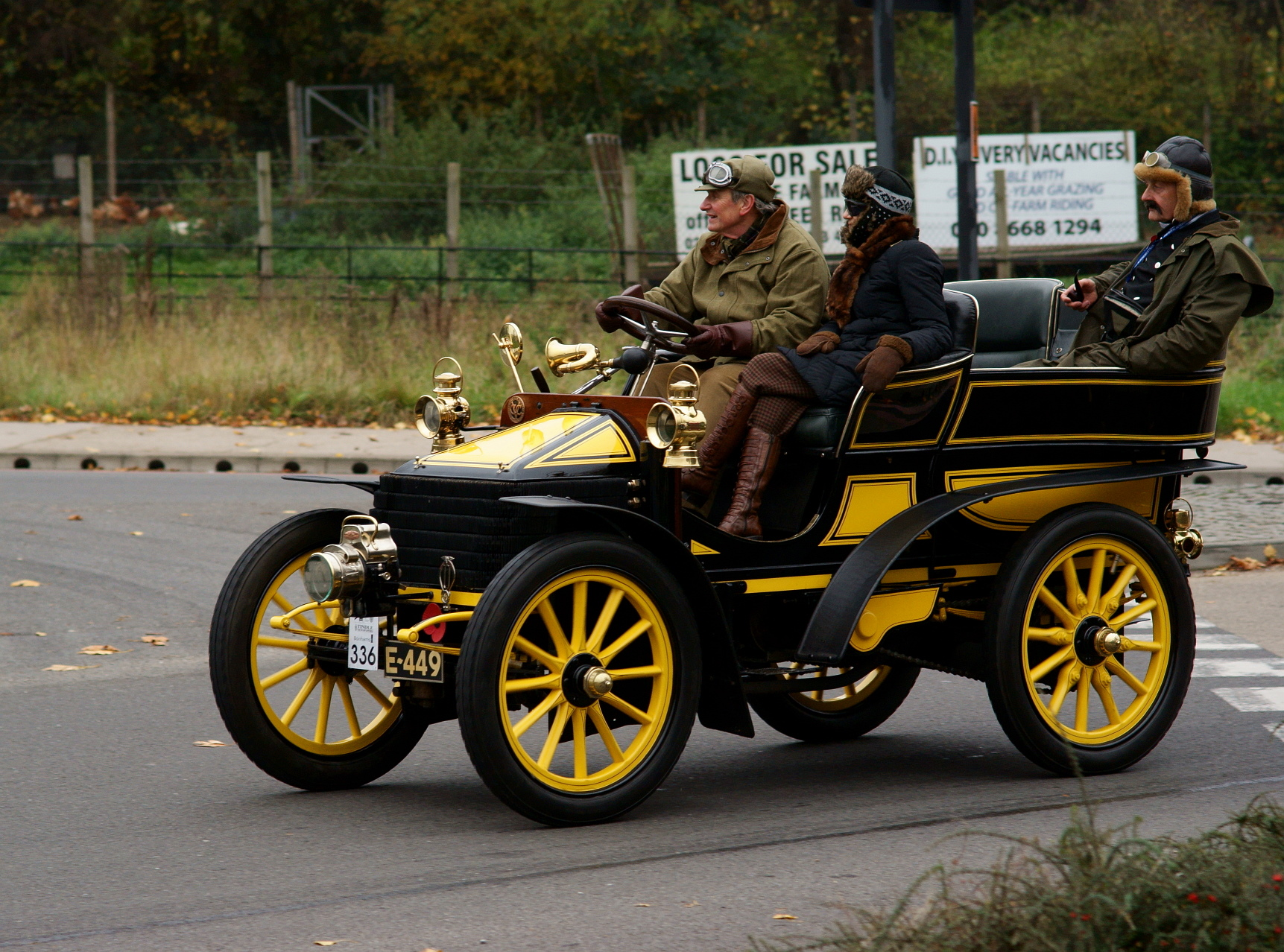
10hp 2-cylinder tonneau 1903

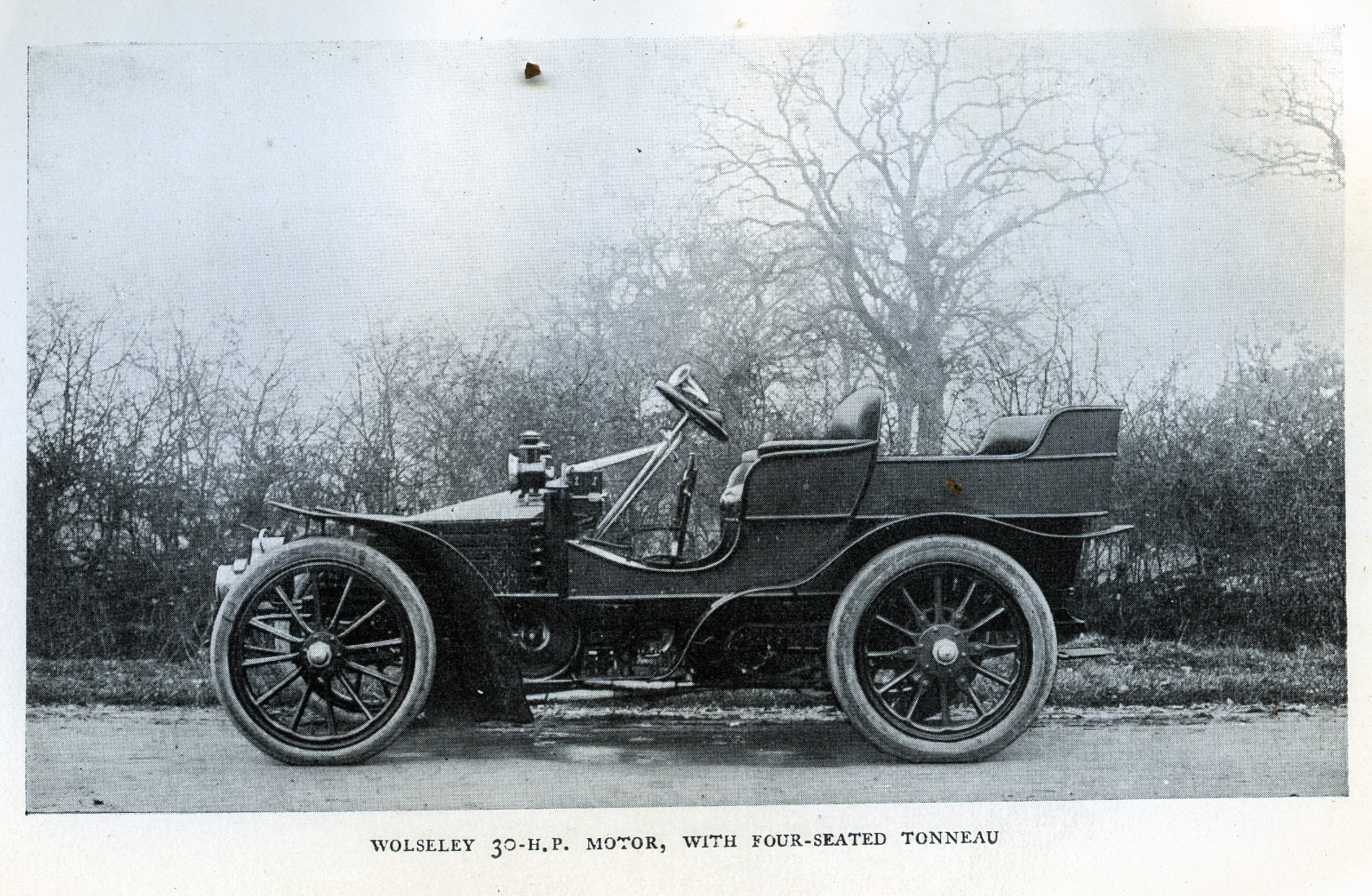
20hp shooting brake 1903

Austin had been searching for other products for WSSMC because sale of sheep-shearing machinery was a highly seasonal trade. About 1895–96 he became interested in engines and automobiles. During the winter of 1895–96, working in his own time at nights and weekends, he made his own version of a design by Léon Bollée that he had seen in Paris. In 1895, a tricycle with two seats in a back-to-back configuration (dos-à-dos) was developed. It was presented in 1896. The front wheels were steered by a lever. The two-cylinder motor made of cast steel was mounted on the side of an aluminum frame and drove the single rear wheel. An image of the vehicle can be seen on page 24 of the visit report of the American Society of Mechanical Engineers from July 28, 1910. Later he found that another British group had bought the rights and he had to come up with a design of his own, having persuaded the directors of WSSMC to invest in the necessary machinery.

In 1897 Austin's second Wolseley car, the Wolseley Autocar No. 1 was revealed. It was a three-wheeled design (one front, two rear) featuring independent rear suspension, mid-engine and back to back seating for two adults. It was not successful and although advertised for sale, none were sold. The third Wolseley car, the four-wheeled Wolseley "Voiturette" followed in 1899. A further four-wheeled car was made in 1900. The 1901 Wolseley Gasoline Carriage featured a steering wheel instead of a tiller. The first Wolseley cars sold to the public were based on the "Voiturette", but production did not get underway until 1901, by which time the board of WSSMC had lost interest in the nascent motor industry.

Thomas and Albert Vickers, directors of Vickers and Maxim, Britain's largest armaments manufacturer, had much earlier decided to enter the industry at the right moment and, impressed by Austin's achievements at WSSMC, they took on his enterprise. When Austin's five-year contract officially ended in 1906 they had made more than 1,500 cars. Wolseley was the largest British motor manufacturer and Austin's reputation was made.

The company had been formed in March 1901. By 1 May 1901 Austin had issued his first catalogue. There were to be two models, 5 hp and 10 hp. They were both available with either a Tonneau or a Phaeton body with either pneumatic or solid tyres. For an additional outlay of thirty shillings (£1.50) the 10 hp model would be fitted with a sprag to prevent it running backwards. "We recommend pneumatic tyres for all cars required to run over twenty miles an hour." Austin then provided a paragraph as to why his horizontal engines were better lubricated (than vertical engines) and that 750 rpm, the speed of his Wolseley engines, avoided the short life of competing engines that ran between 1,000 and 2,000 rpm."

The association with Vickers not only helped in general design but in the speed of production and provision of special steels

The Wolseley range from 1901 to 1905.

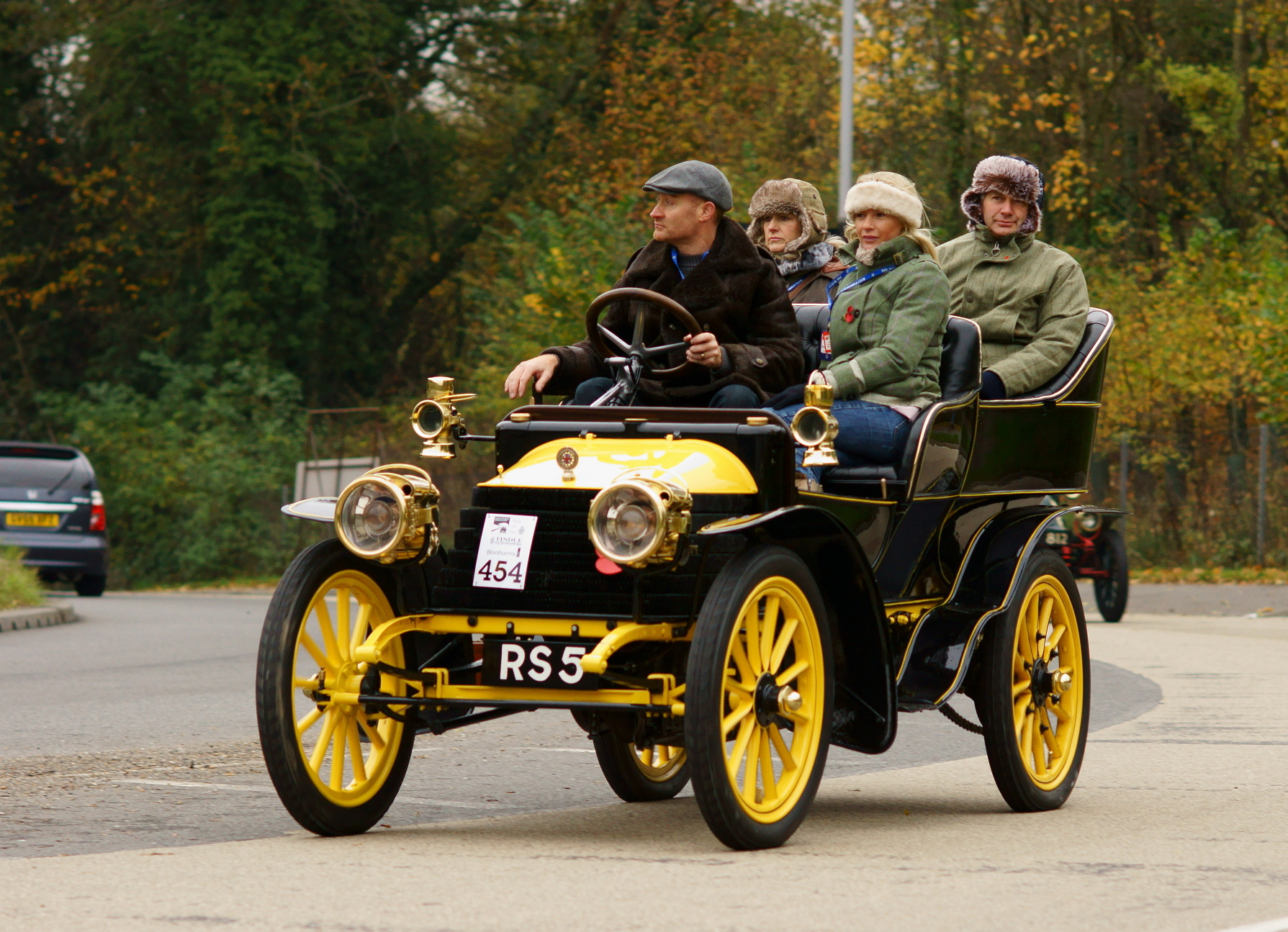
8hp 2-cylinder tonneau 1904

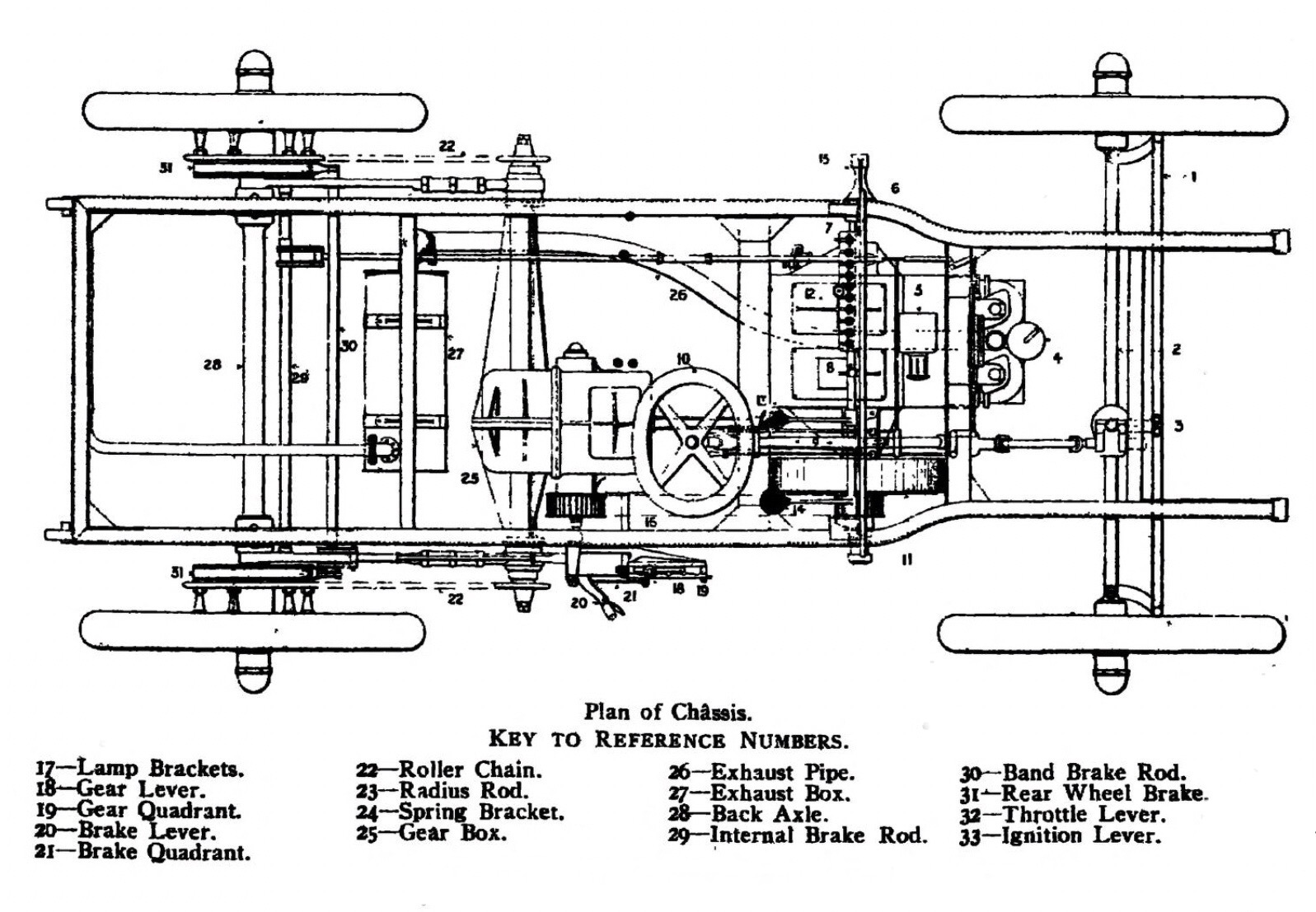
Wolseley 12 hp (1905-1910) top

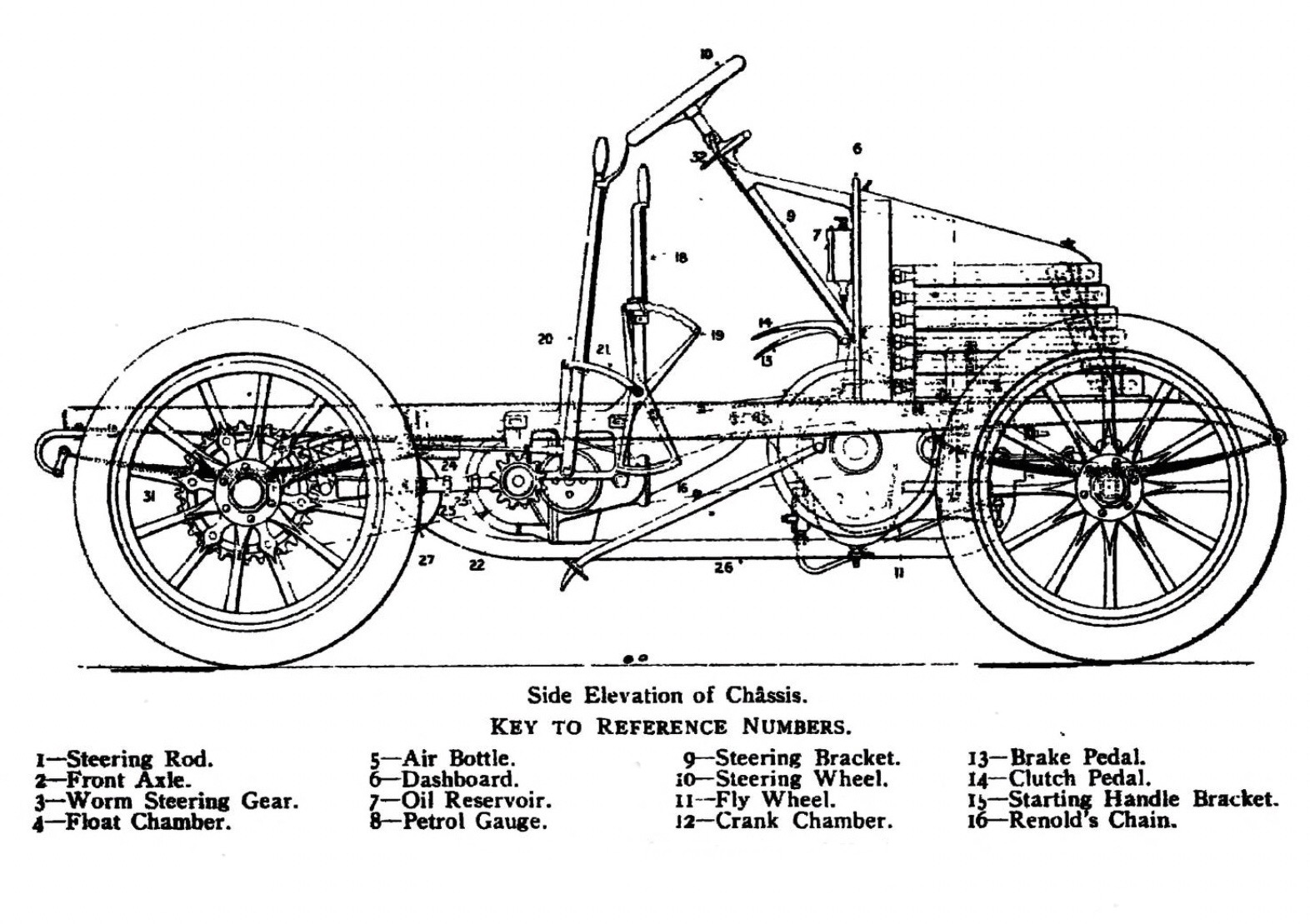
Wolseley 12 hp (1905-1910) side

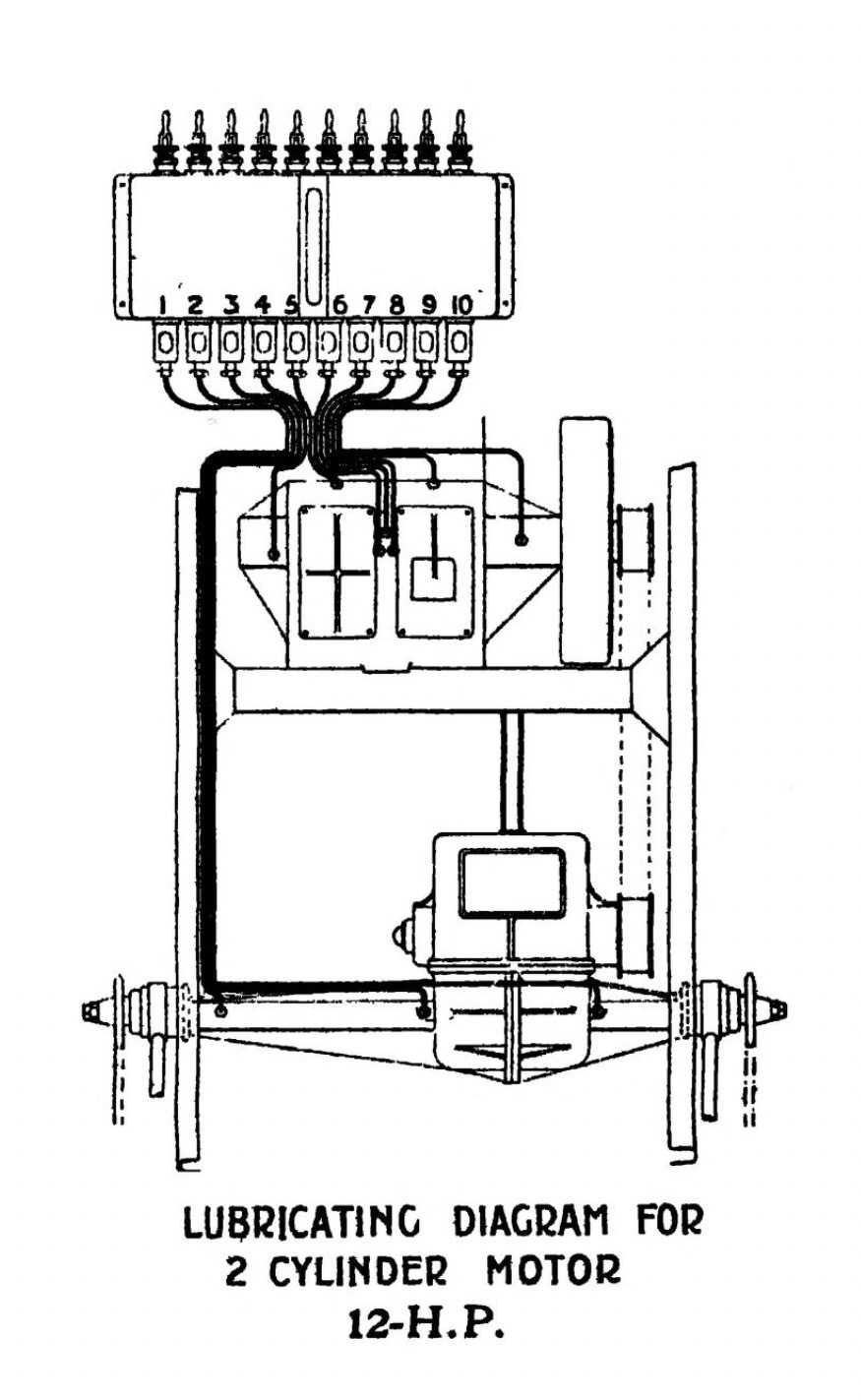
Wolseley 12 hp (1905-1910) lubricating

Engines were horizontal which kept the centre of gravity low. Cylinders were cast individually and arranged either singly, in a pair or in two pairs which were horizontally opposed. The crankshaft lay across the car allowing a simple belt or chain-drive to the rear axle:

- 5 hp, 6 hp from 1904
- 7½ hp, 8 hp from 1904
- 10 hp, 12 hp from 1904
- from 1904 16 hp
- 20 hp, 24 hp from 1904

in 1904 Queen Alexandra bought a 5.2-litre 24 hp landaulette with coil ignition, a four-speed gearbox and chain drive.

==== John Siddeley ====
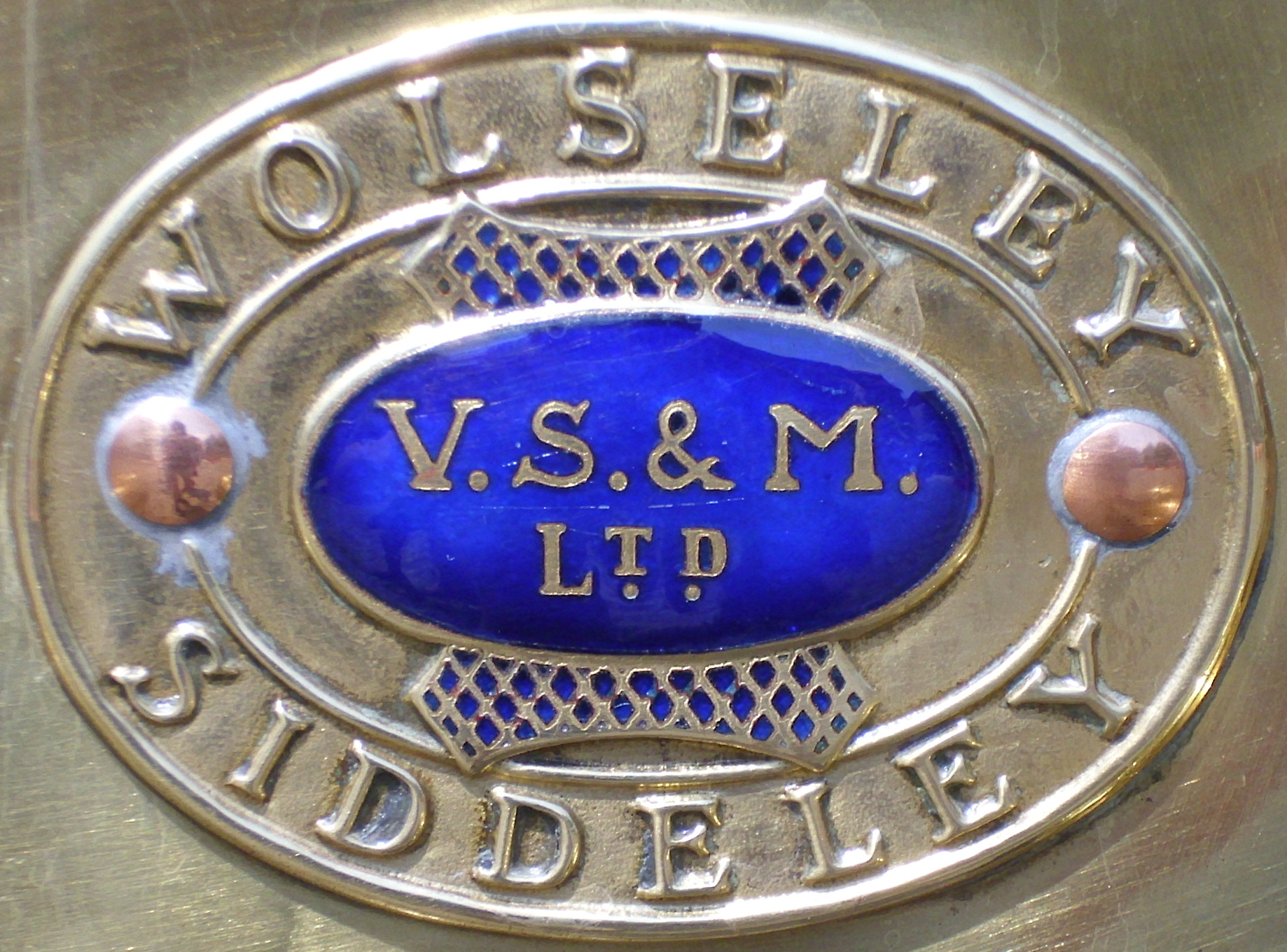
Name plate: Vickers, Sons & Maxim Wolseley Siddeley

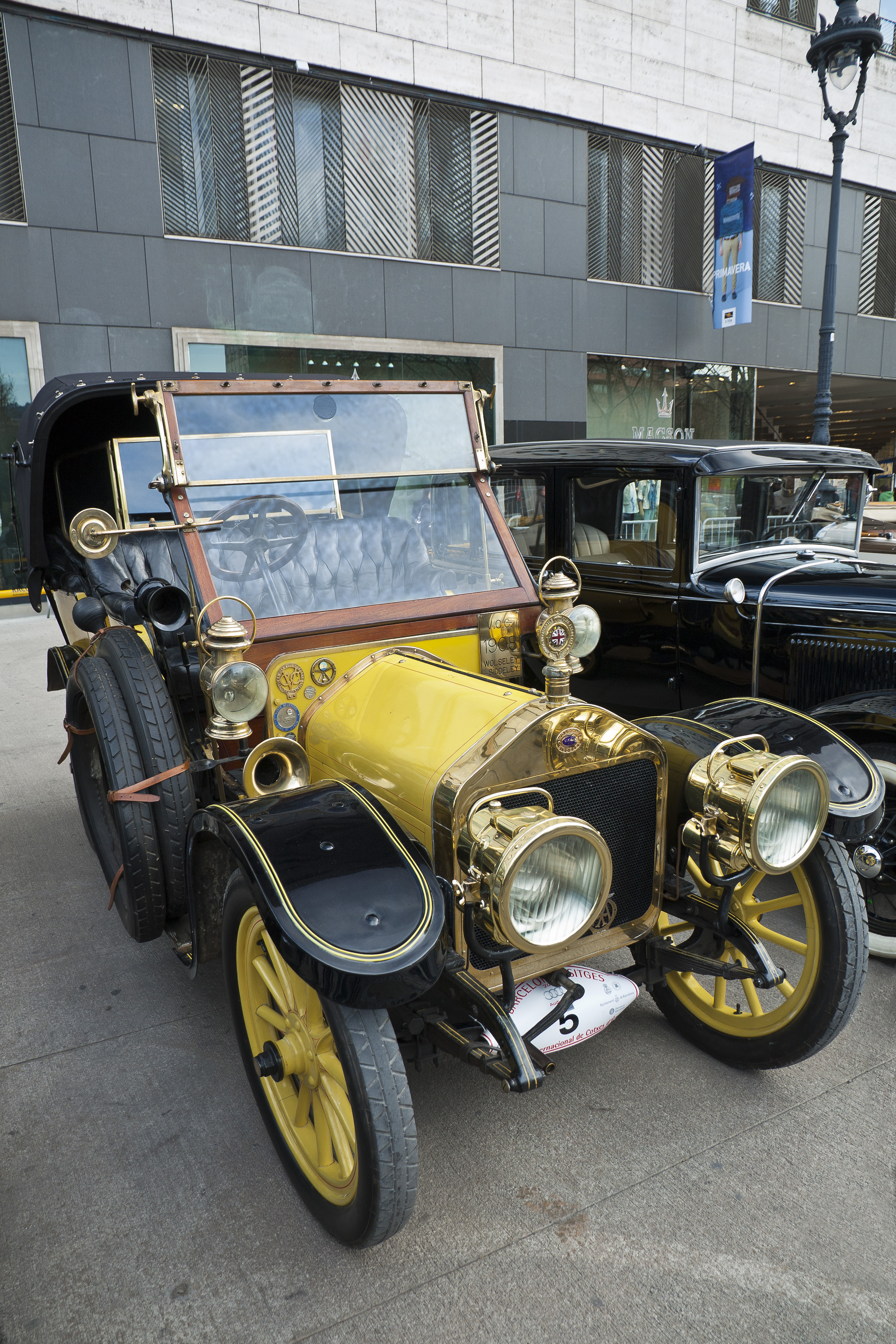
2.6 litre 14 hp rotund phaeton (tourer) 1908

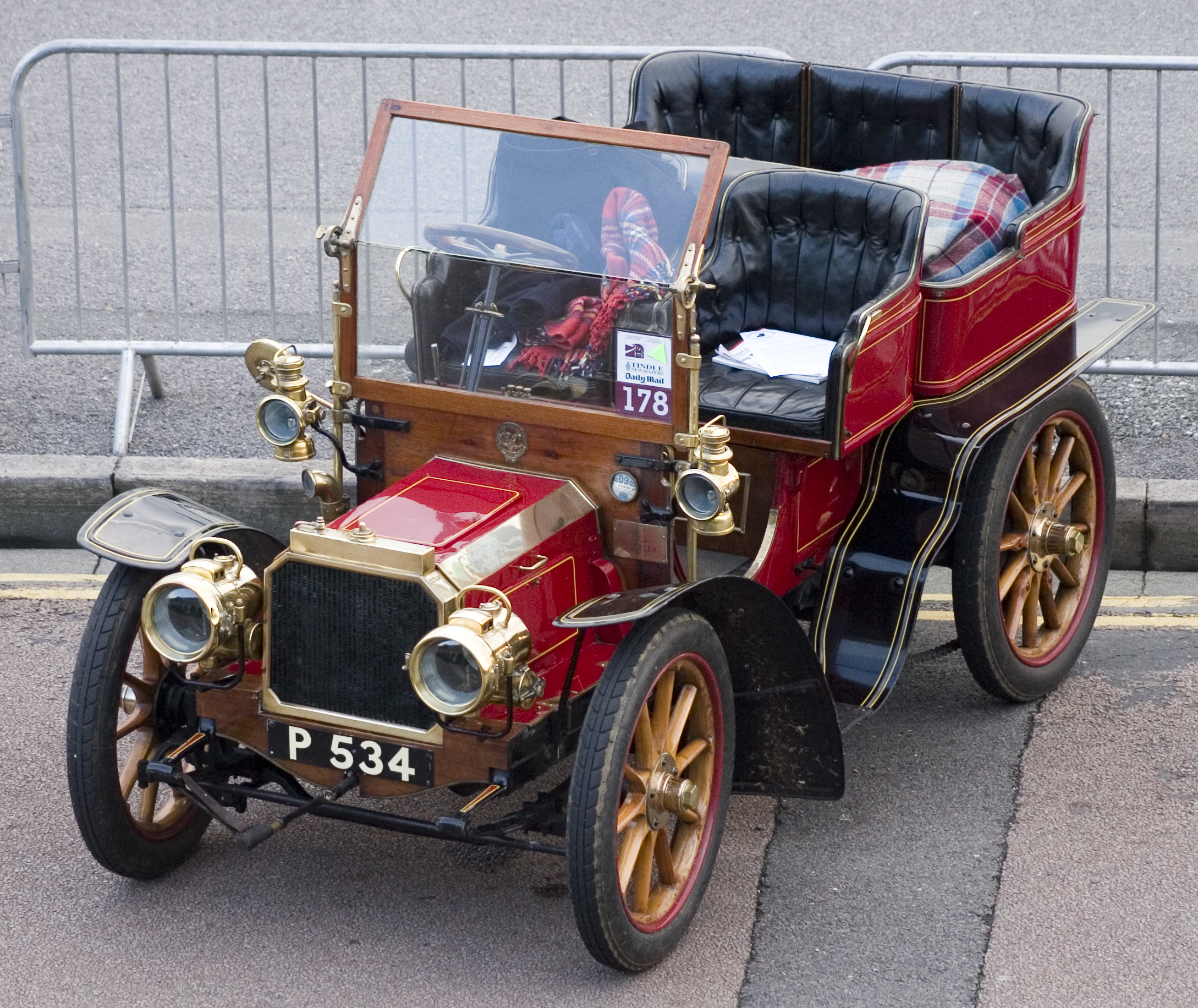
1902 Siddeley 8 hp

John Siddeley (1st Baron Kenilworth) founded his Siddeley Autocar Company in 1902 to manufacture cars to Peugeot designs. He had Peugeot-based demonstration cars at the Crystal Palace in 1903. By 1905, the company had a dozen models for sale and some of them were built for him at Vickers' Crayford, Kent factory.

During 1905 Wolseley—which then dominated the UK car market—purchased the goodwill and patent rights of his Siddeley Autocar Company business and appointed Siddeley London sales manager of Herbert Austin's The Wolseley Tool and Motor Car Company Limited owned by Vickers, Sons and Maxim. A few months later Herbert Austin left Wolseley to found his own Austin Motor Company due to resolute refusal to countenance new vertical engines for his Wolseleys, whatever his directors might wish. Austin handed in his resignation the year before his contract ended. and Siddeley was appointed manager of Wolseley in his place and, without authority, added Siddeley to the badge on the Wolseley cars.

Siddeley, on his appointment to Austin's former position, promptly replaced Austin's horizontal engines with the now conventional upright engines. With him he brought his associate Lionel de Rothschild as a member of the Wolseley board. Together they gave the business a new lease of life. At the November 1905 Olympia Motor Show, the first at the former National Agricultural Hall, two small 6 hp and 8 hp cars were still exhibited with horizontal engines but there were also Siddeley's new 15, 18 and 32 hp cars with vertical engines. This switch to vertical engines brought Wolseley a great deal of publicity and their products soon lost their old-fashioned image.

However a tendency then arose for journalists to follow the company's full-page display advertising and drop the first word in Wolseley Siddeley — "Siddeley Autocars made by (in smaller typeface) the Wolseley Tool . . ." Certainly it was true the new engines were named Siddeley engines. Meanwhile, under Siddeley Wolseley maintained the sales lead left to him by Austin but, now run from London, not (Austin's base) Birmingham, the whole business failed to cover overheads. A board member, Walter Chetwynd, was set to find a solution. It was decided the business operated from too many different locations. First the board closed the Crayford Kent works, moving the whole operation back to Birmingham and dropping production of commercial vehicles and taxicabs – a large number of which, 500+, were made during Siddeley's time including an early 10 hp taxicab made in 1908 sold to a Mr W R Morris of Holywell St. Oxford who ran a garage and hire car business there, as well as making bicycles. Then the London head office followed. After some heated discussions Siddeley resigned in the spring of 1909 and Rothschild went, too.

He resigned from Wolseley in 1909 to go into partnership with H P P Deasy and manage the Deasy Motor Company, also of Coventry.

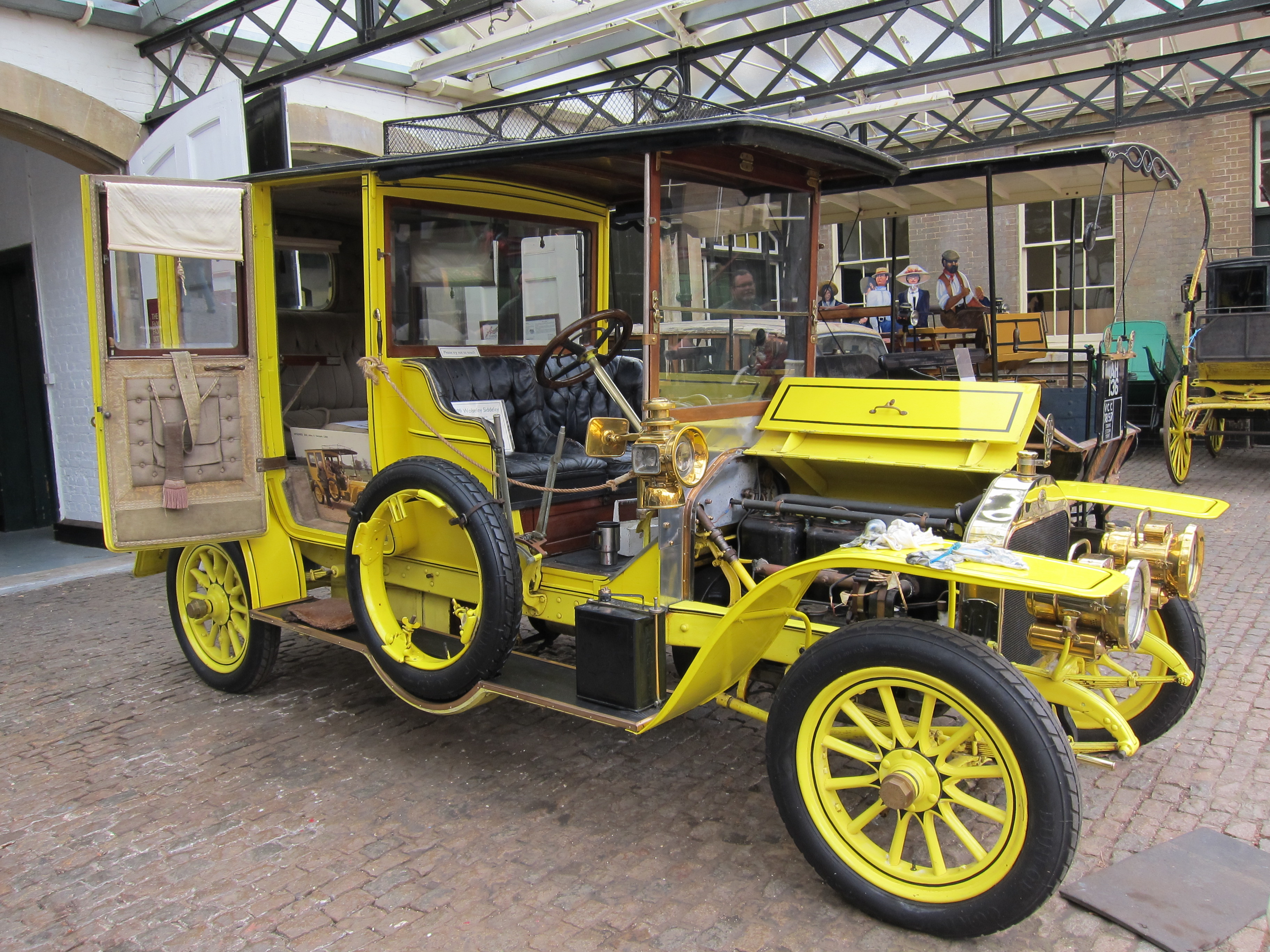
8.6-litre 40–50 hp limousine for the Earl of Leicester 1909

Ernest Hopwood was appointed managing director in August 1909.

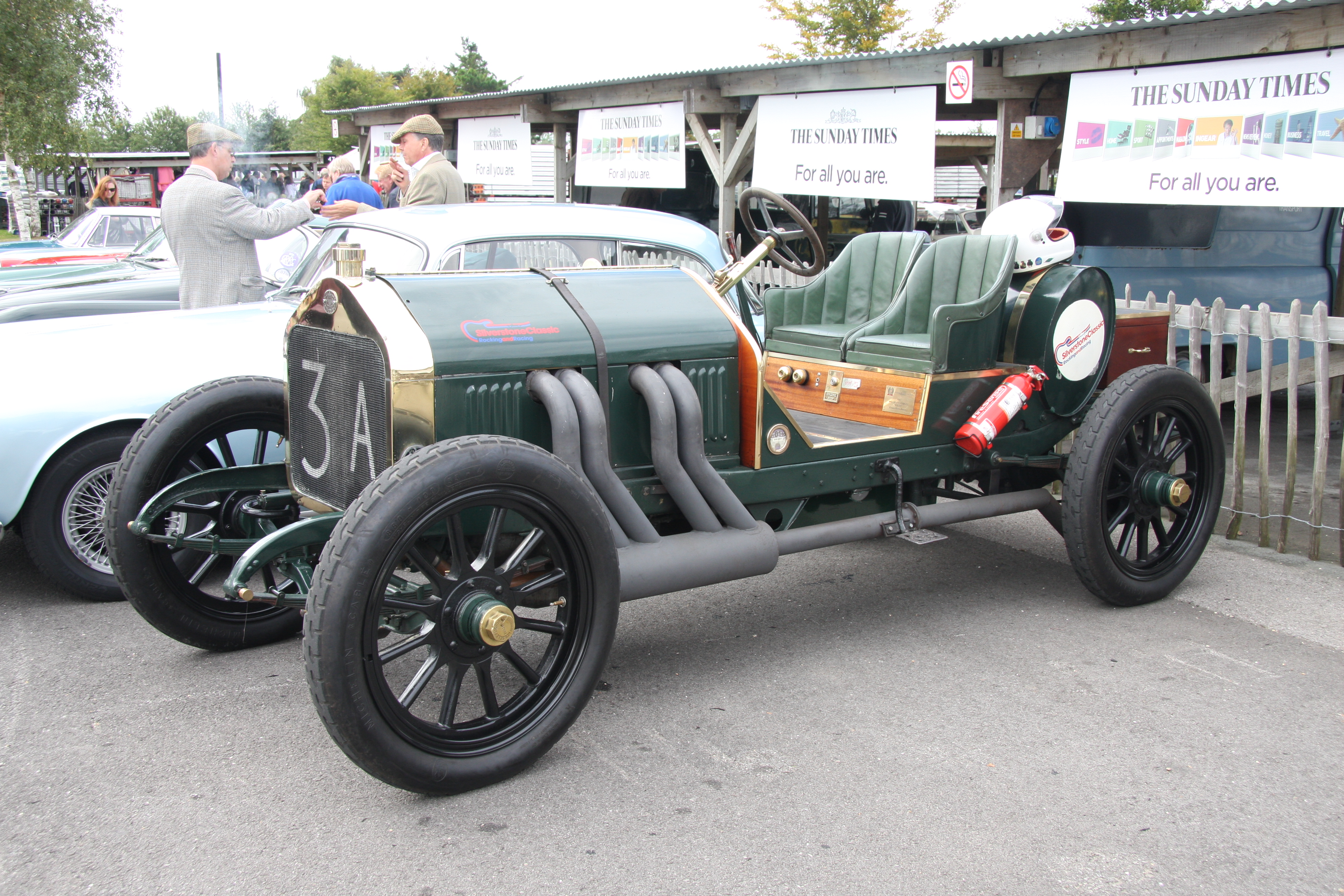
Wolsit racer 1907

==== Wolseley Italy or Wolsit ====
Wolsit Officine Legnanesi Autmobili was incorporated in 1907 by Macchi Brothers and the Bank of Legnano to build Wolseley cars under licence in Legnano, about 18 kilometres north-west of central Milan. A similar enterprise, Fial, had started there a year earlier but failed in 1908. Wolsit automobile production ended in 1909, the business continued but made luxury bicycles. Emilio Bozzi made the Ciclomotore Wolsit from 1910 to 1914. A team of Wolsit cars competed in motoring events in 1907.

The Wolseley range in 1909:

- 12/16 hp
- 16/20 hp
- 20/24 hp
- 24/30 hp

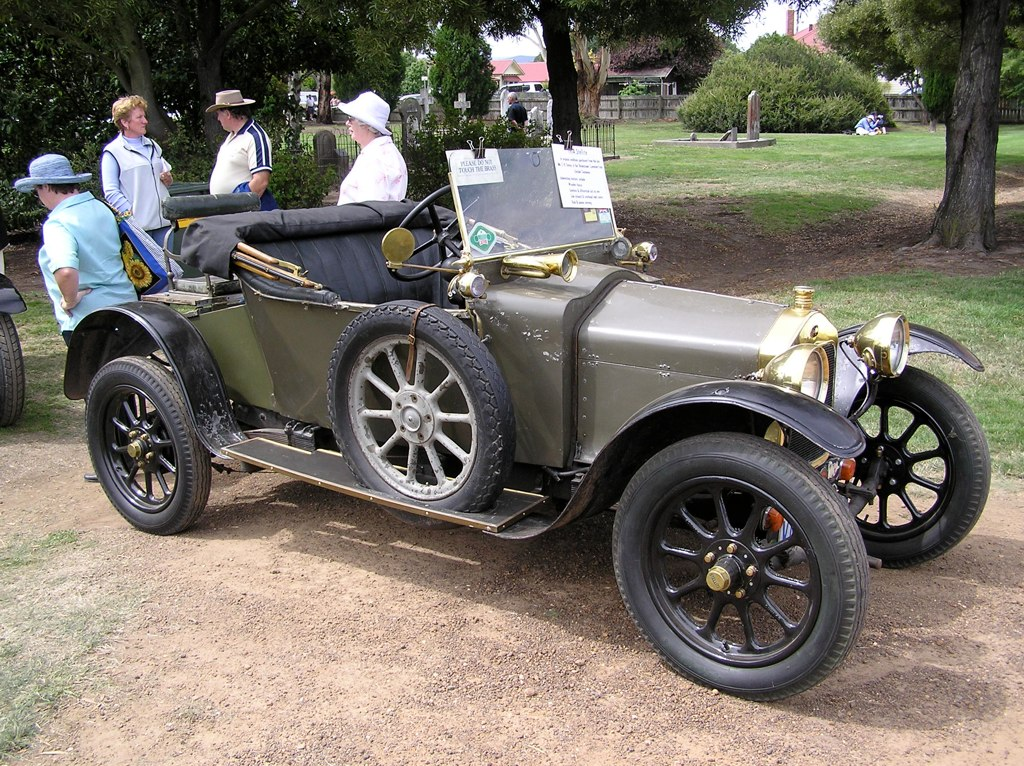
Stellite, a separate low-priced range designed by Wolseley 1914

- 30/34 hp
- 40 hp
- 40/50 hp
- 60 hp

After 1911 the name on the cars was again just Wolseley.

Chetwynd's recommendations soon led to a revival in profits and a rapid expansion of Wolseley's business. The Adderley Park factory was greatly extended in 1912. These extensions were opened in 1914 but there was not sufficient space for the new Stellite model which was instead produced and marketed by another Vickers subsidiary, Electric and Ordnance Accessories Company Limited.

==== Machine tools, buses, rail engines etc ====
Wolseley was not then as specialised in its operations as members of the motor industry were to become. For other members of the Vickers group they were general engineers and they also handled engineering enquiries directed on to them by other group members. Wolseley built double-decker buses for the Birmingham Corporation. They also built many specials such as electric lighting sets and motor boat engines – catalogued sizes were from 12 hp to 250 hp with up to twelve cylinders and complete with gearboxes. Fire engines too and special War Office vehicles being a subsidiary of a major armaments firm. As befits a company with tool in its name they built machine tools including turret lathes and horizontal borers though chiefly for their own use or for group members. Large engines were made to power petrol-electric railcars, such as those used by the North-Eastern Railway Company in 1904, and still larger engines were made for the Delaware and Hudson railroad. In 1905 they also offered petrol narrow-gauge railway locomotives.

The Brennan mono-rail truck which gave rides at the Japan–British Exhibition at Shepherd's Bush in 1910, used a 20HP engine manufactured by the Wolseley Tool and Motor Car company to power the gyroscopic stabilisation and an 80HP Wolseley engine for the petrol-electric propulsion of the 22 ton vehicle.

==== Marine and aero-engines ====
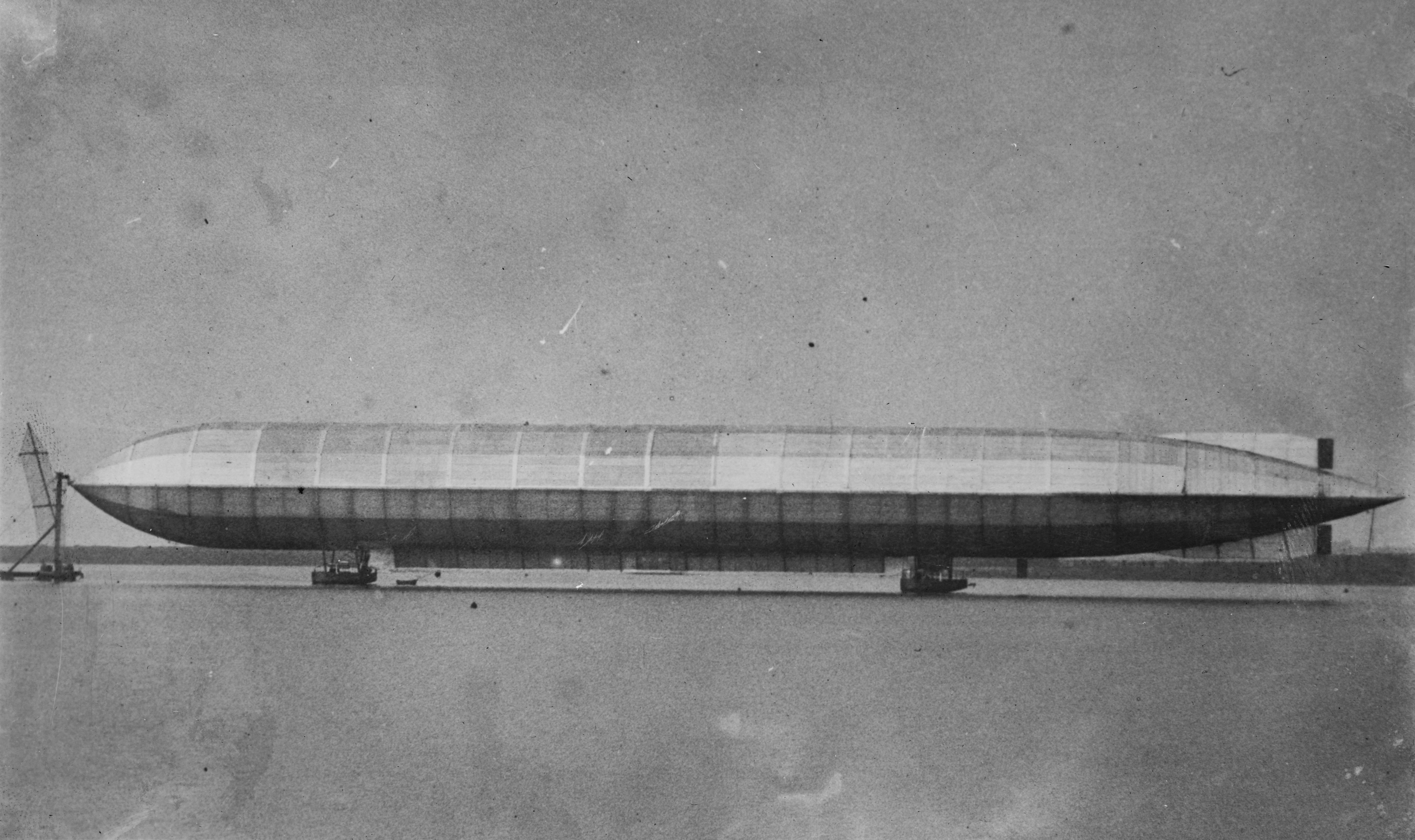
Airship HMA No. 1 Mayfly, built by Vickers, Sons and Maxim, powered by Wolseley 160 hp engines, September 1911

While at first Wolseley supplied engines for launches, made for them by Teddington Launch Works, they moved on to small river craft and light coasting boats. The demand for engines for larger vessels grew. It was not uncommon for orders to be booked for 70-foot (21 m) yachts, racing launches and ferry boats to carry fifty or more passengers. These were manufactured by S E Saunders Limited at Cowes, Isle of Wight. Special engines were made for lifeboats. In 1906 horizontal engines of sixteen cylinders were designed and constructed for British submarines. They were designed to run at a low speed. High efficiency V8 engines were made for hydroplanes as well as straight eights to run on petrol or paraffin. Weight was very important and these engines were of advanced design. The first British rigid airship HMA No. 1 "Mayfly" was fitted with Wolseley 160 hp engines.

Ferdinand de Baeder (1865–1944), Belgian holder of Aviator's certificate No. 107, won Prix des Pilots, Prix des Arts et Metiers, Coupe Archdeacon, Prix Capitaine Berger at Châlons-en-Champagne in his Wolseley-engined Voisin biplane on 30 December 1909.

By the summer of 1910 Wolseley were able to supply the following specially designed water-cooled aero-engines:

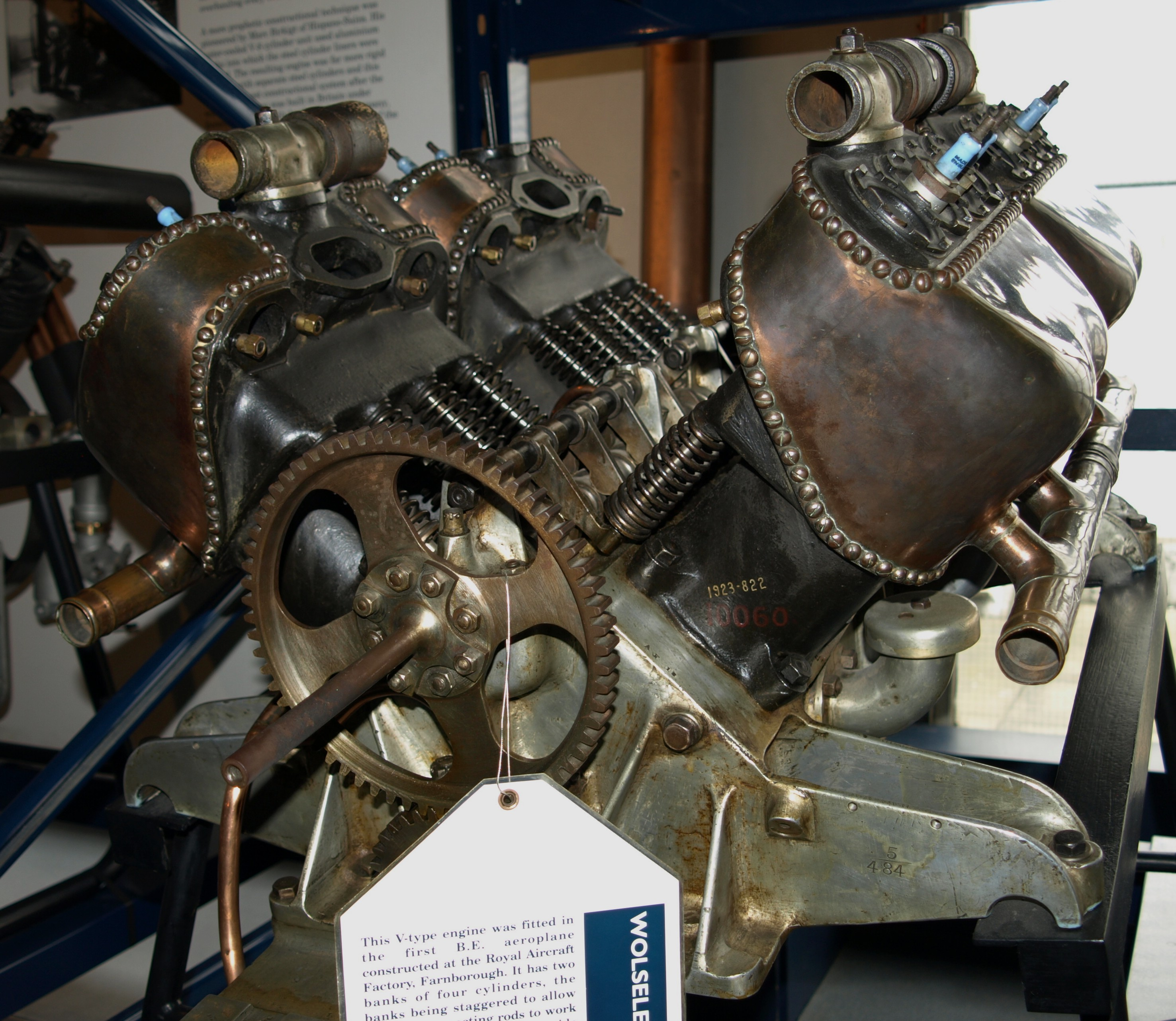
60 hp V8 aero-engine 1910

- 30 hp 4-cylinder, bore and stroke: 3¾ x 5½ inches, displacement 5.85 litres
- 60 hp V8-cylinder, bore and stroke: 3¾ x 5½ inches, displacement 11.7 litres.
- They were soon followed by a 120 hp version
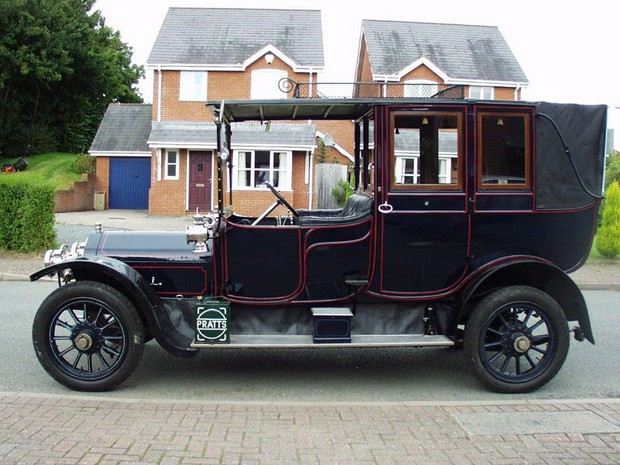
16-20 hp 1912

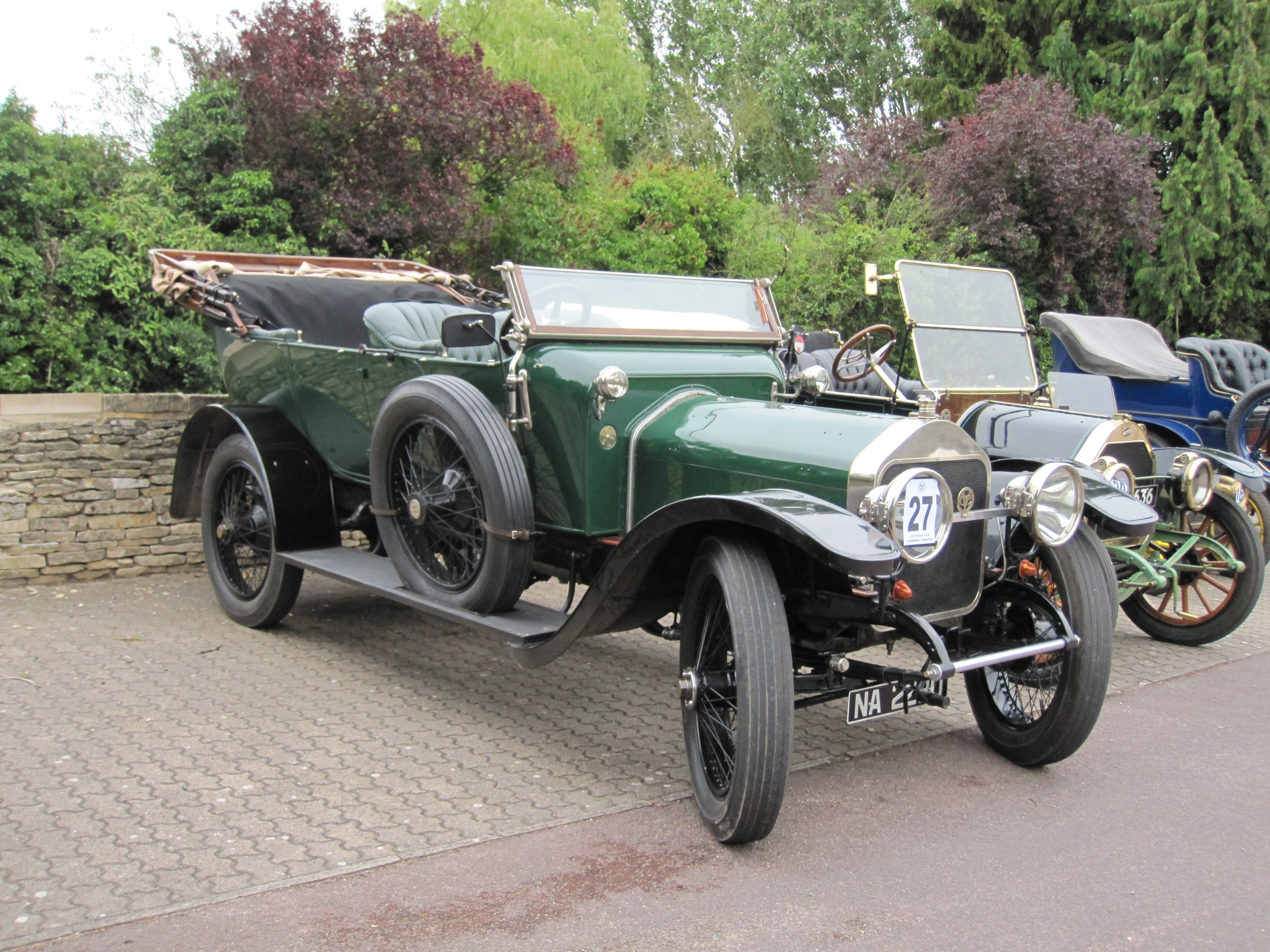
24-30 Colonial model 1912

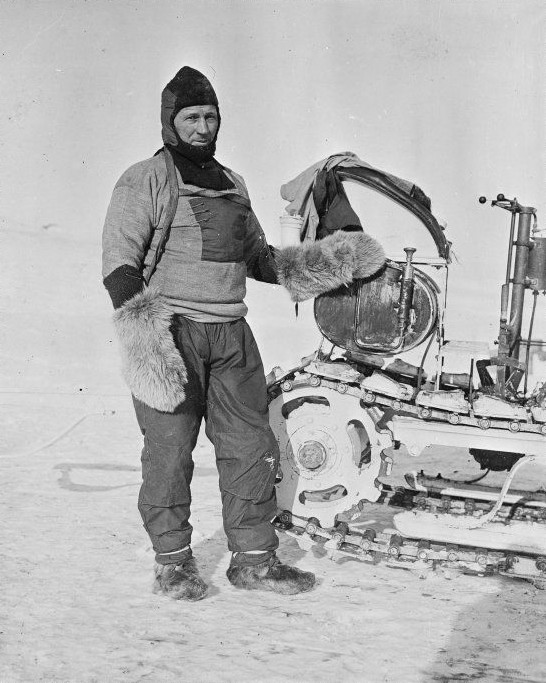
Antarctic November 1911

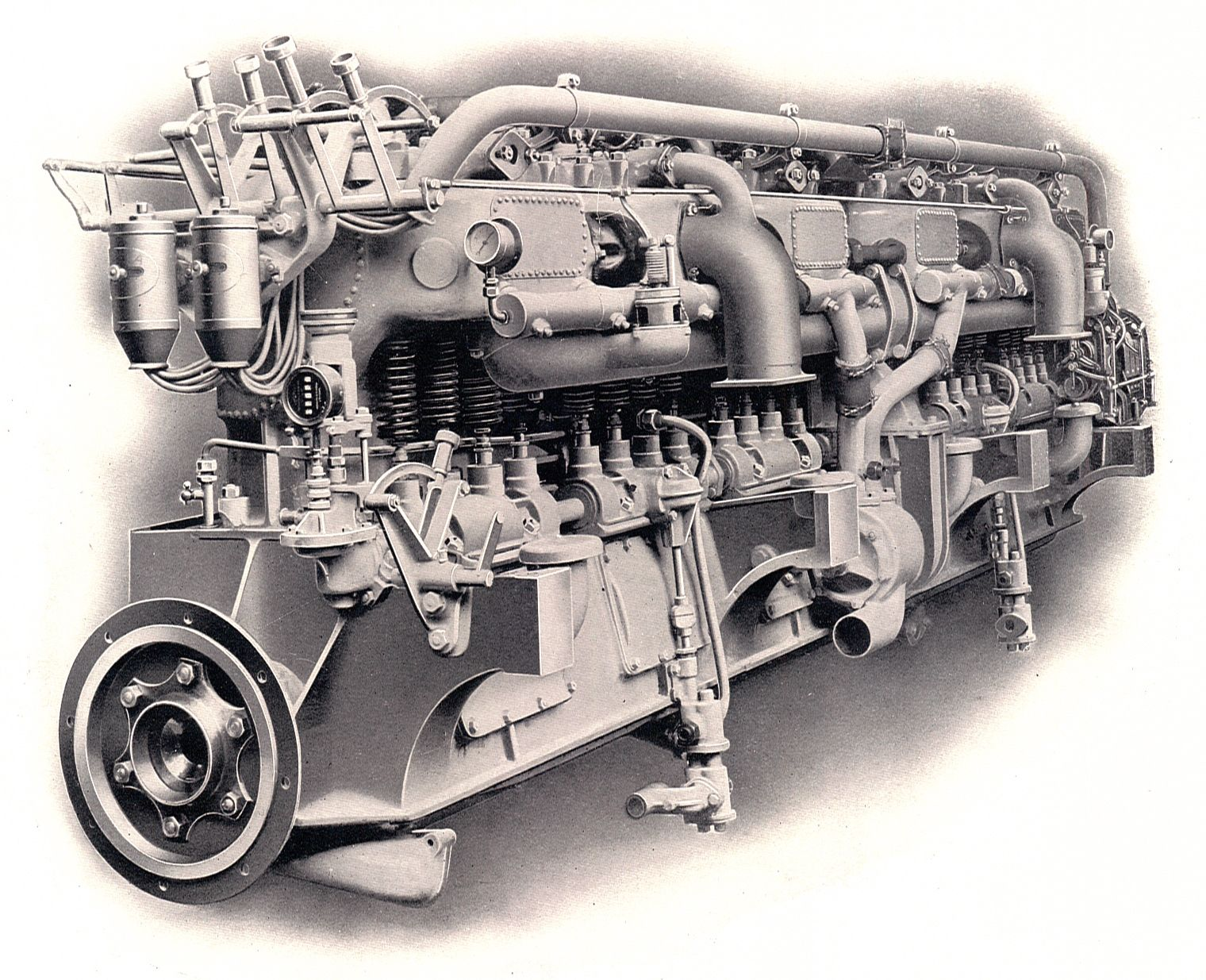
360 hp 12-cylinder marine engine

Caterpillar tracked tractors were designed and supplied to Robert Falcon Scott for his ill-fated second expedition to the Antarctic. Orders were also received for use by the Deutsche Antarktische Expedition.

In 1914 Wolseley produced a two-wheeled gyroscopically balanced car for the Russian lawyer and inventor Count Pyotr Shilovsky. This resembled a huge motorcycle surmounted by a car body, but with the ability to balance when stationary due to the gyroscopic stabilisation mechanism. It made a number of demonstration runs, but unfortunately with the onset of war it was put to one side. It was discovered again in 1938 when workmen uncovered its well preserved remains in the Ward End property of Wolseley. It was then transferred into the Wolseley Museum.

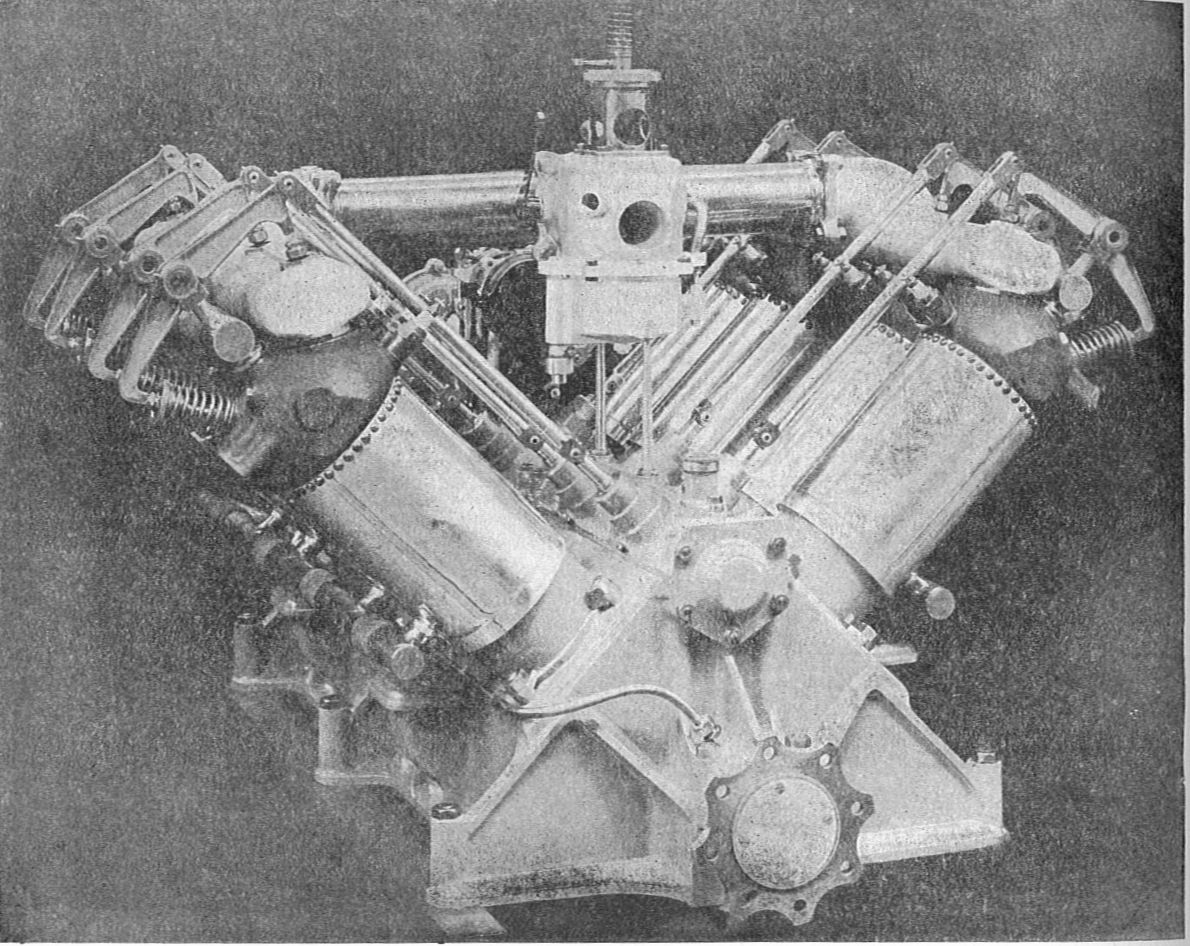
Wolseley 120 hp V8 aero engine 1910

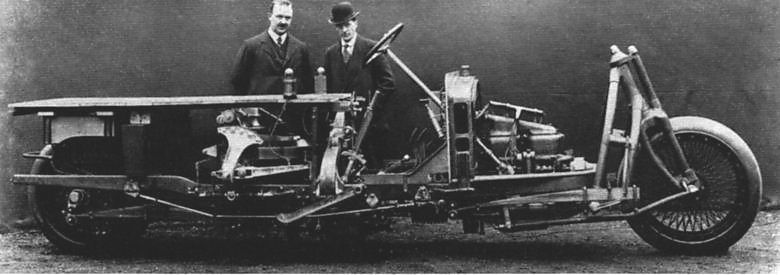
Schilowsky's gyrocar

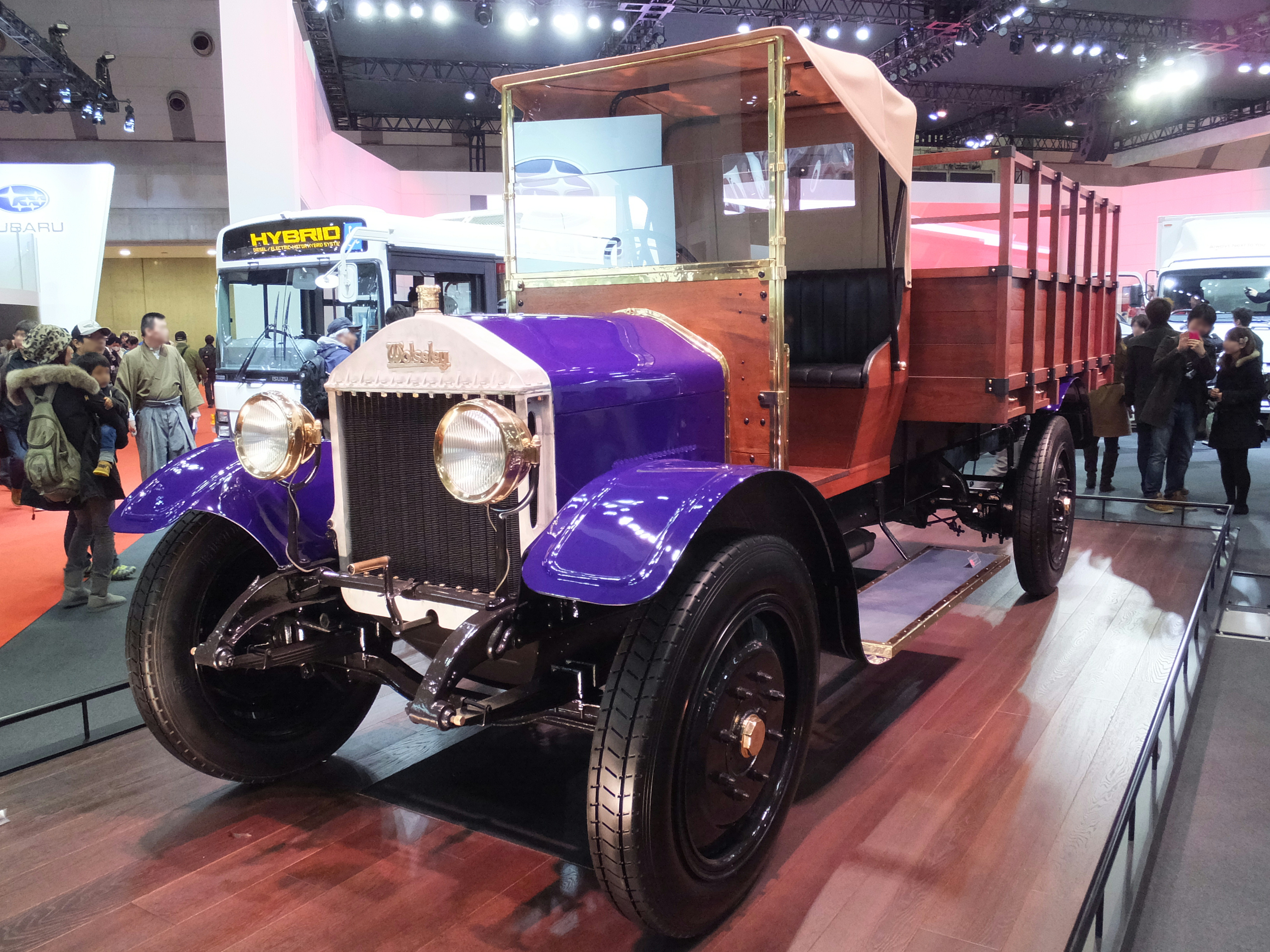
1½-ton lorry

==== Commercial vehicles ====
From 1912 lorries and other commercial vehicles were supplied. Until the outbreak of war in 1914 Wolseley offered six types of commercial vehicle from 12 cwt delivery van to a five-ton lorry with a 40 hp engine.

=== Wolseley Motors Limited 1914 ===
By 1913 Wolseley was Britain's largest car manufacturer selling 3,000 cars. The company was renamed Wolseley Motors Limited in 1914.
It also began operations in Montreal and Toronto as Wolseley Motors Limited. This became British and American Motors after the First World War. In January 1914 the chairman, Sir Vincent Caillard, told shareholders they owned probably the largest motor-car producing company in the country and that its factory floor space now exceeded 17 acres.

== First World War ==
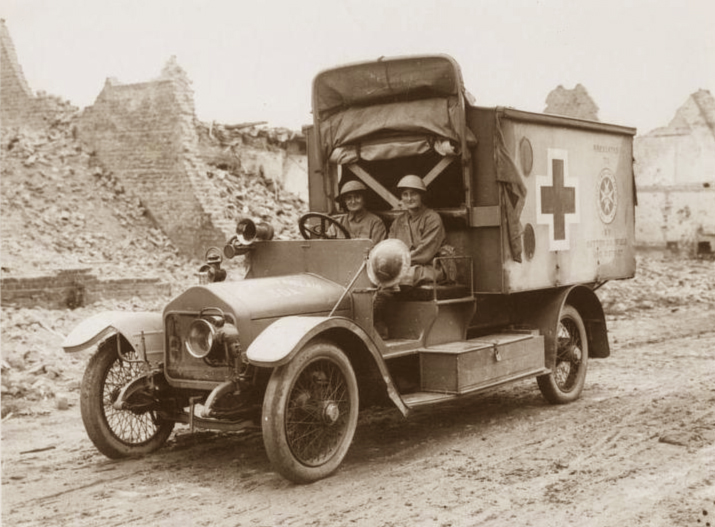
Wolseley ambulance of "The Madonnas of Pervyse"

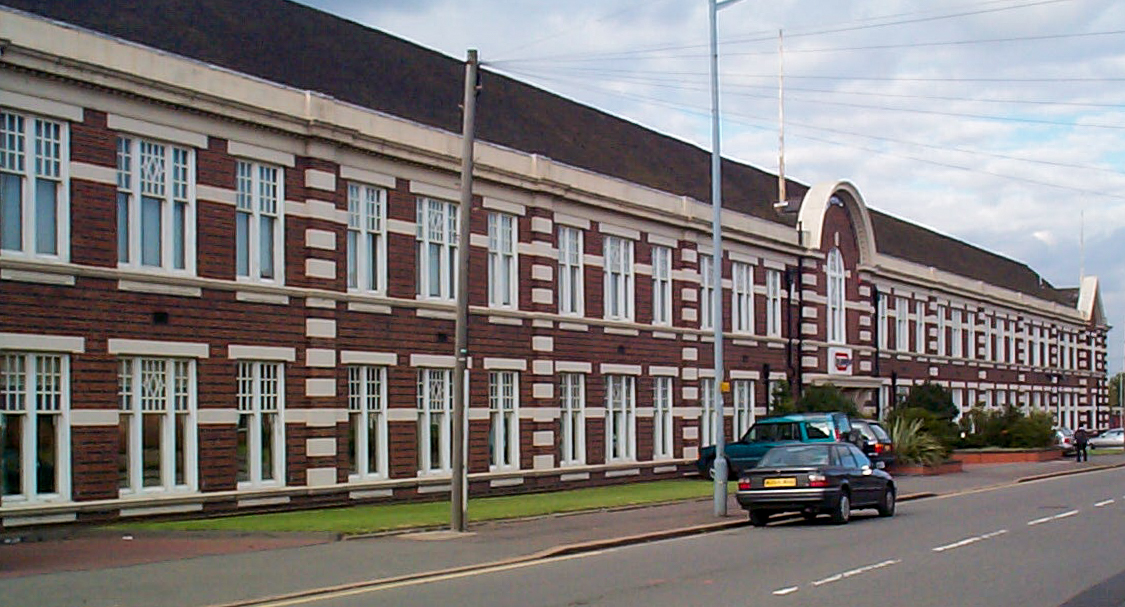
Former Wolseley works, Ward End

Entering wartime as Britain's largest car manufacturer Wolseley initially contracted to provide cars for staff officers and ambulances. Government soon indicated their plant might be better used for supplies more urgently needed. Postwar the chairman, Sir Vincent Caillard, was able to report Wolseley had provided, quantities are approximate:

- 3,600 motorcars and lorries including the equivalent in spare parts
- 4,900 aeronautical engines including the equivalent in spare parts
- 760 aeroplanes
- 600 sets aeroplane spare wings and tailplanes
- 6,000 airscrews of various types
- Director firing gear for 27 battleships, 56 cruisers and 160 flotilla leaders and destroyers
- 1,200 naval gun mountings and sights
- 10 transmission mechanisms for rigid airships
- 2,650,000 18-pounder shells
- 300,000 Stokes's bombs

Aero engines produced in wartime included:

- Renault eight and twelve-cylinder Vee-type
- "Maybach" six-cylinder water-cooled 180 hp developed from a Maybach Zeppelin engine
- The Dragonfly nine-cylinder air-cooled radial
- Boucier fourteen-cylinder air-cooled radial
- Hispano designed V8 known as the Viper. By 1918 sixty of these engine were being produced each week
- Airship engines for the British Admiralty

The Scottish Horse Mounted Brigade's Field Ambulance developed an operating car, designed by Colonel H. Wade in 1914, which enclosed an operating table, sterilisers, full kit of instruments and surgical equipment, wire netting, rope, axes and electric lighting in a Wolseley car chassis. This operating car was employed during the Gallipoli Campaign at Suvla, in the Libyan Desert (during the Senussi Campaign) and at Kantara in Egypt, before being attached to the Desert Mounted Corps Operating Unit in 1917. Subsequently, taking part in the Southern Palestine Offensive, which culminated in the Capture of Jerusalem.

In 1918, Wolseley began a joint venture in Tokyo, with Ishikawajima Ship Building and Engineering. The first Japanese-built Wolseley car rolled off the line in 1922. After World War II the Japan venture was reorganized, renaming itself Isuzu in 1949.

== Postwar expansion and collapse ==
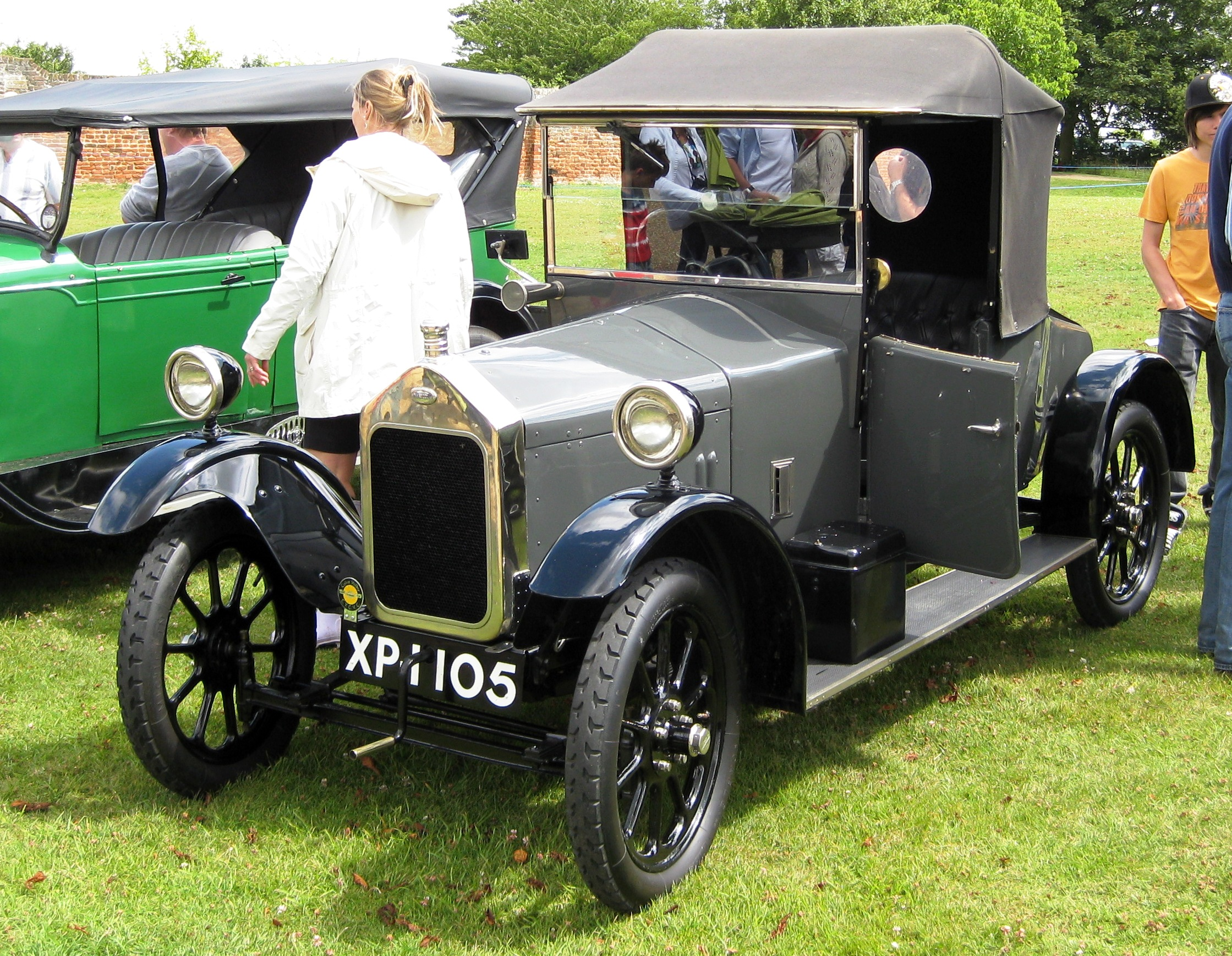
Wolseley Ten 1923 postwar Stellite

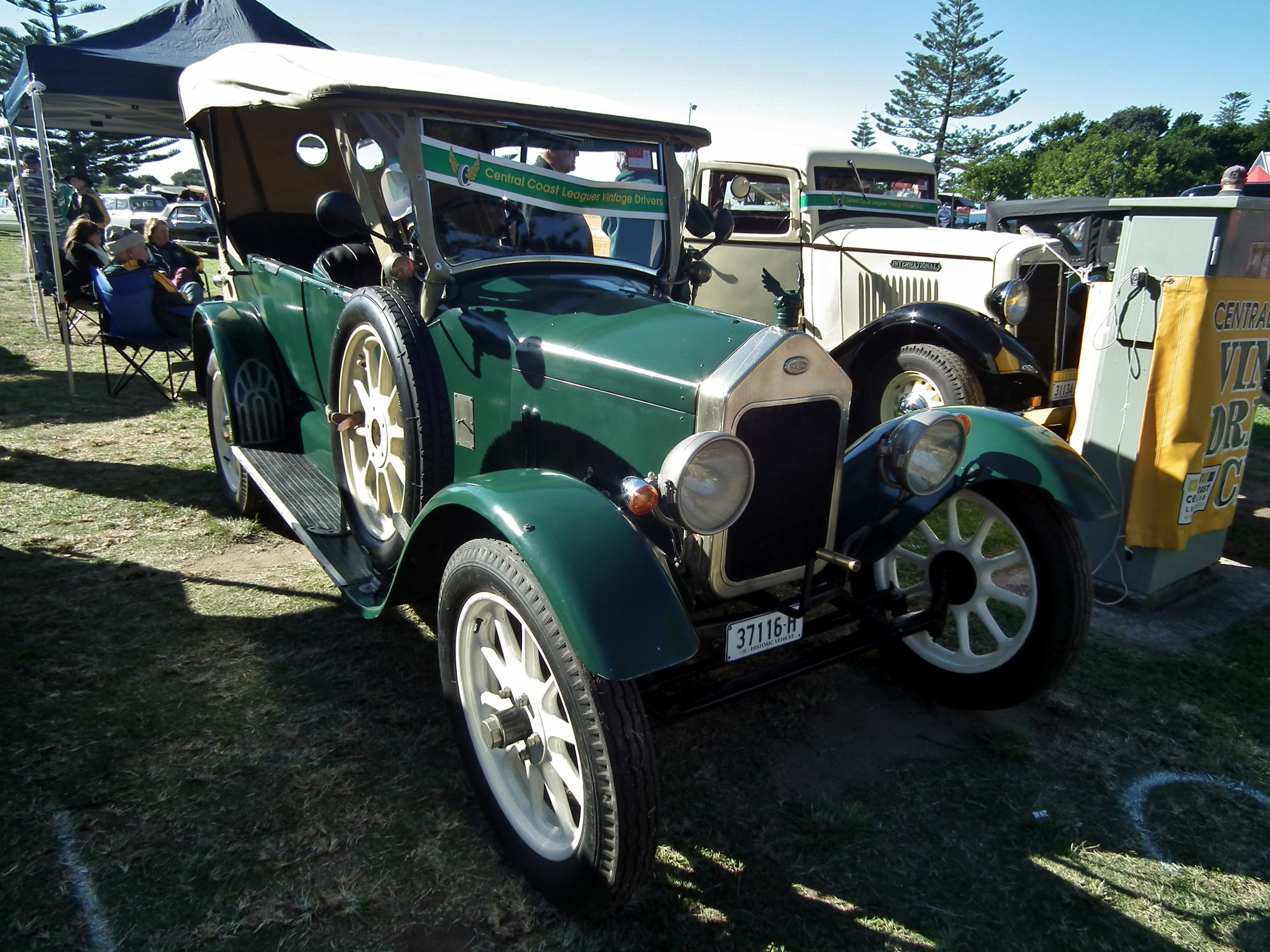
Fifteen tourer 1923

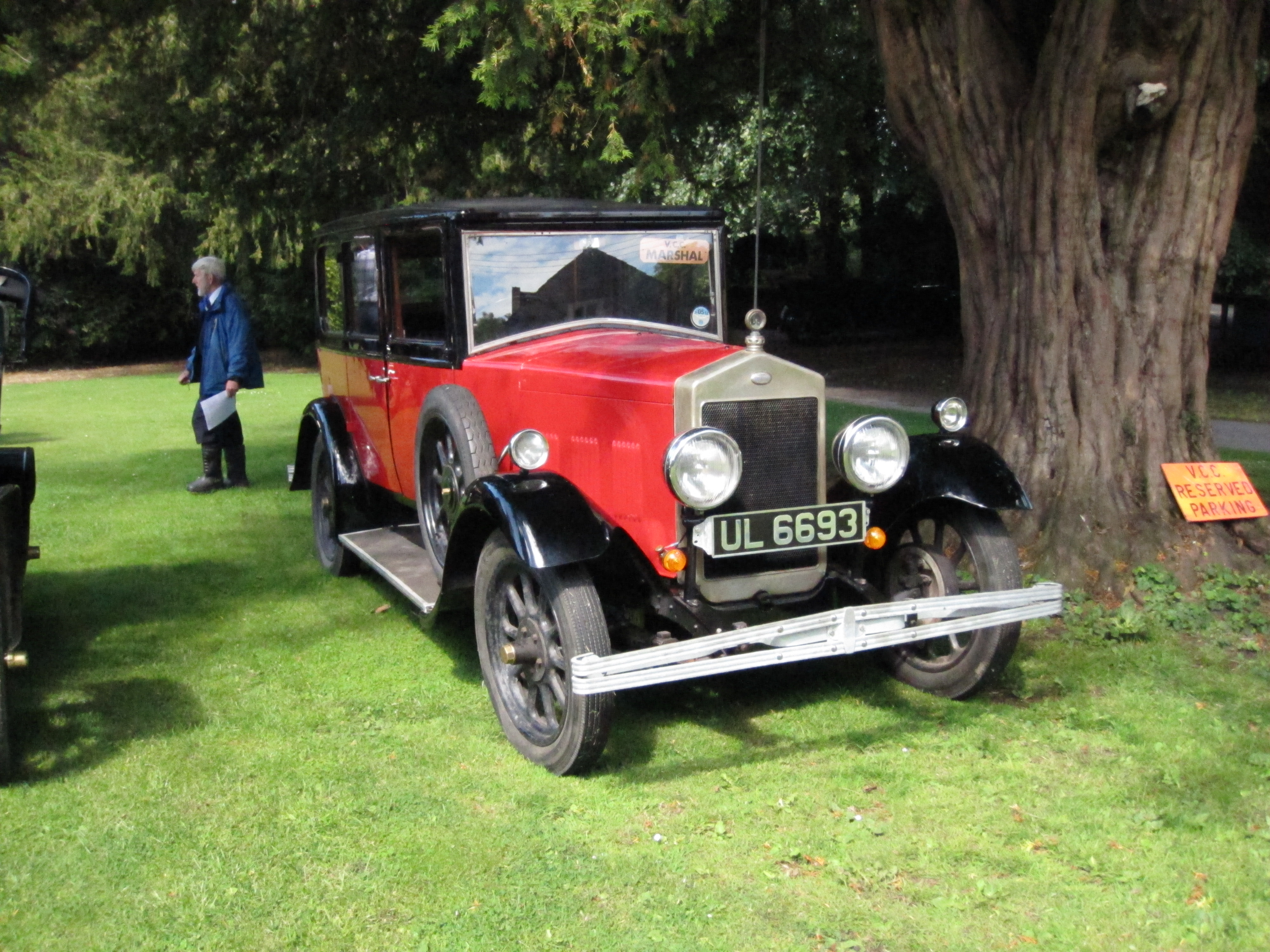
16–45 2-litre six-cylinder 6-light saloon admired by W R Morris

Thomas Vickers died in 1915, and Albert Vickers in 1919, both having reached their eighties. During the war, Wolseley's manufacturing capacity had rapidly developed and expanded. Immediately postwar, the Vickers directors decided to manufacture cars in large quantities at relatively cheap prices. Demand was good. They would borrow money, purchase the whole Ward End site and further expand Wolseley's works. Vickers also decided to consolidate their motor car interests in one company. Wolseley accordingly purchased from within the Vickers group: Electric and Ordnance Accessories Company Limited, the Motor-Car (Stellite Car) Ordnance Department and the Timken Bearing Department and announced Wolseley's future car programme would be:

1. 10 hp four-cylinder two or three-seater touring car based on the Wolseley designed Stellite car
2. 15 hp four-cylinder four-seater touring car
3. 20 hp six-cylinder chassis to be fitted with a variety of the best types of carriage work

Examples of all these models were exhibited at the Olympia Show in November 1919. The design of the 10 hp and 15 hp engines closely followed their wartime Hispano aero engine using an overhead camshaft. The public considered the 15 hp was too innovative and a new "14 hp" car using the same engine was hastily created to fill the gap.

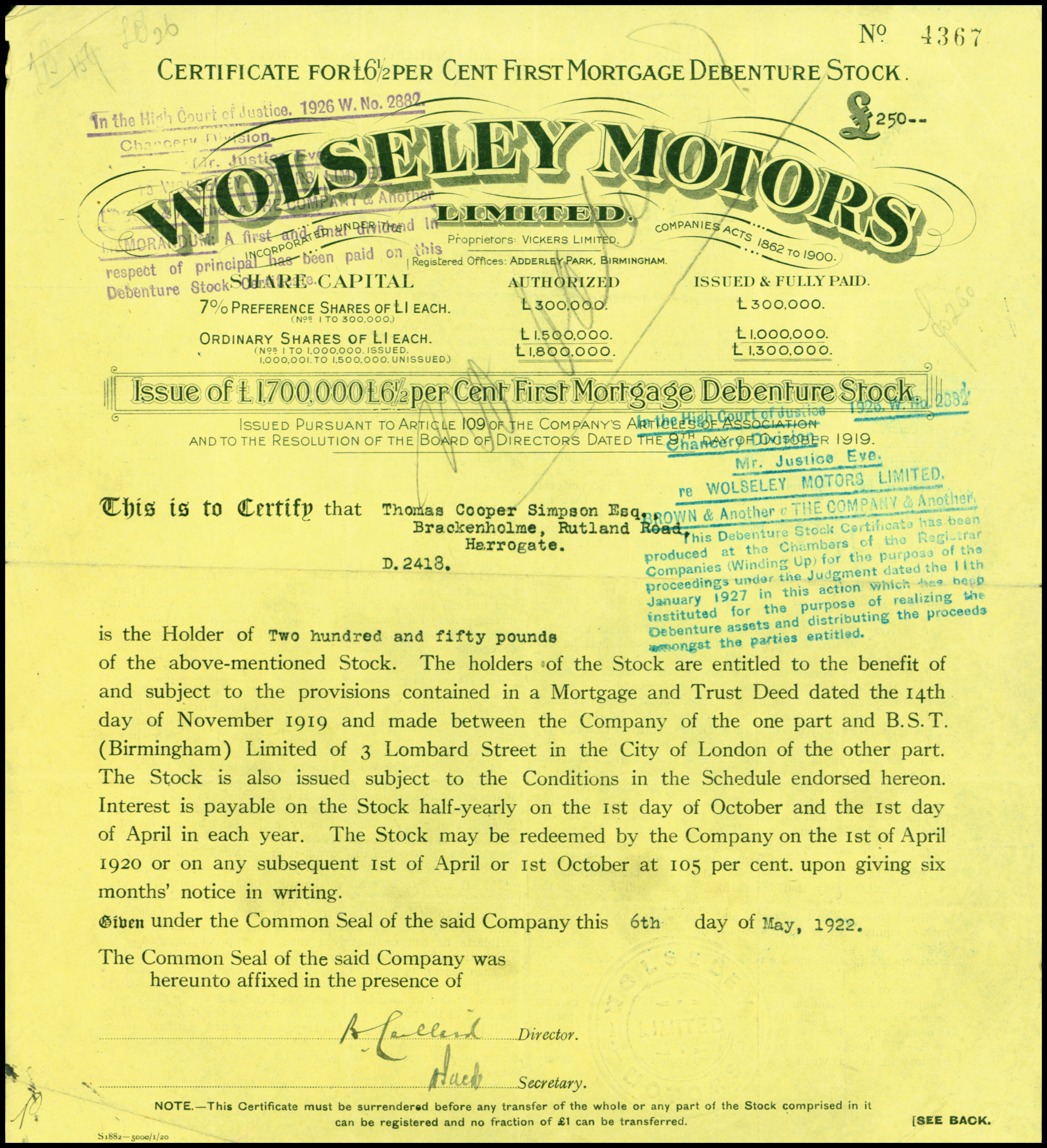
Debenture stock certificate issued 6 May 1922 Wolseley Motors Ltd

Wolseley duly took over the Ward End, Birmingham munitions factory from Vickers in 1919 and purchased a site for a new showroom and offices in London's Piccadilly by the Ritz Hotel. Over £250,000 was spent on the magnificent new building, Wolseley House. This was more than double their profits for 1919, when rewarding government contracts were still running. Those contracts ended. The government then brought in a special tax on "excess wartime profits". There was a moulders' strike from December 1919 to April 1920, but in spite of that it was decided to continue the manufacture of other parts. Then a short, sharp general trade slump peaked in July 1920 and almost every order Wolseley had on its books was cancelled. In 1920 Wolseley had reported a loss of £83,000. The following years showed even greater losses. Next, in October 1922, W R Morris startled the whole motor industry by a substantial reduction in the price of his cars. In 1924, Wolseley's annual loss would reach £364,000.

Ernest Hopwood had been appointed Managing Director in August 1909 following Siddeley's departure. He had resigned late in 1919 due to ill-health. A J McCormack who had been joint MD with Hopwood since 1911 resigned in November 1923 and was replaced by a committee of management. Then, at the end of October 1926, it was disclosed the company was bankrupt "to the tune of £2 million" and Sir Gilbert Garnsey and T W Horton had been appointed joint receivers and managers. It was described as "one of the most spectacular failures in the early history of the motor industry".

== Morris ==
=== W R Morris ===
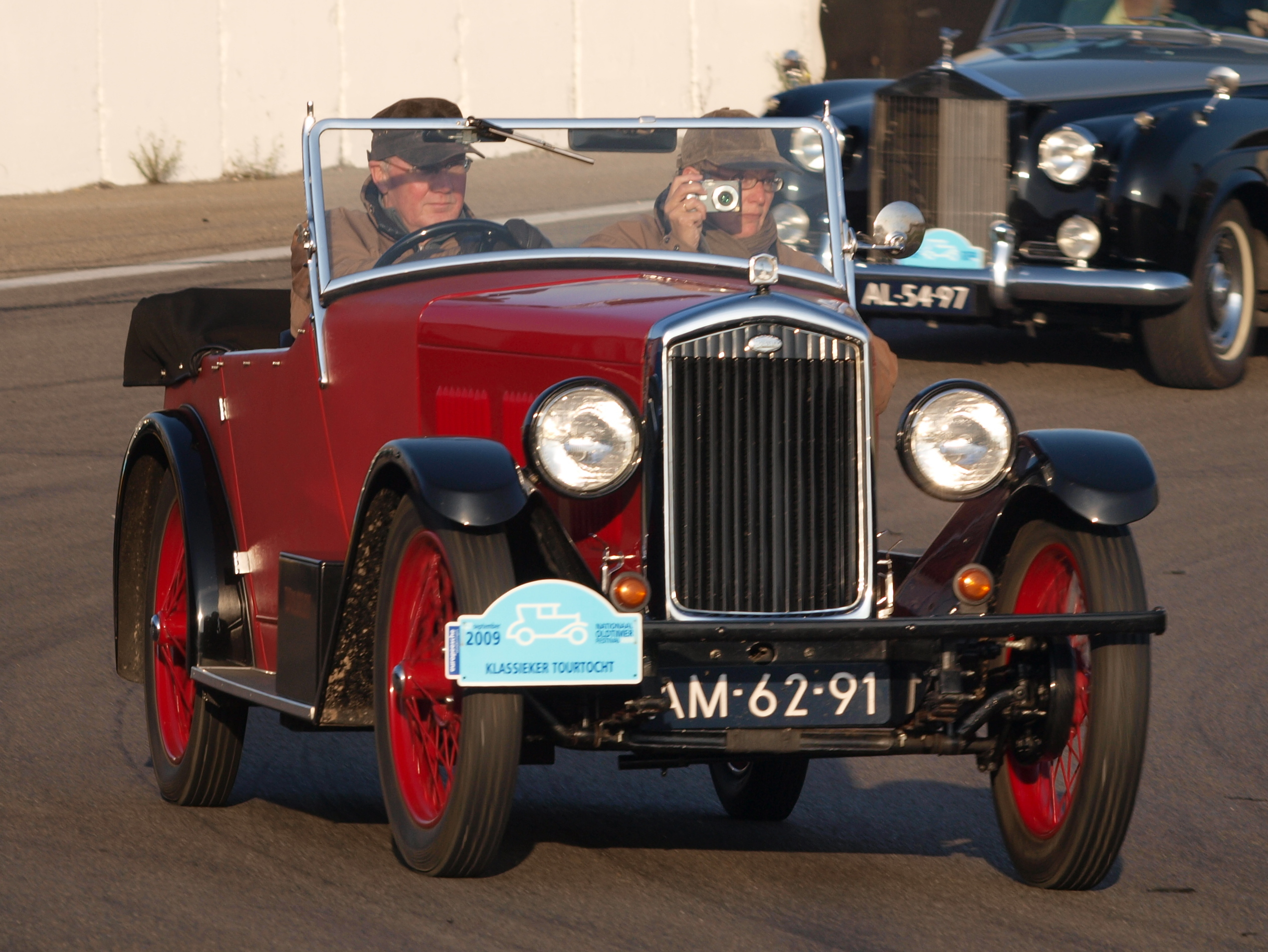
Hornet 1¼-litre open 2-seater 1931 initially a 6-cylinder development of Wolseley's design for the Morris Minor

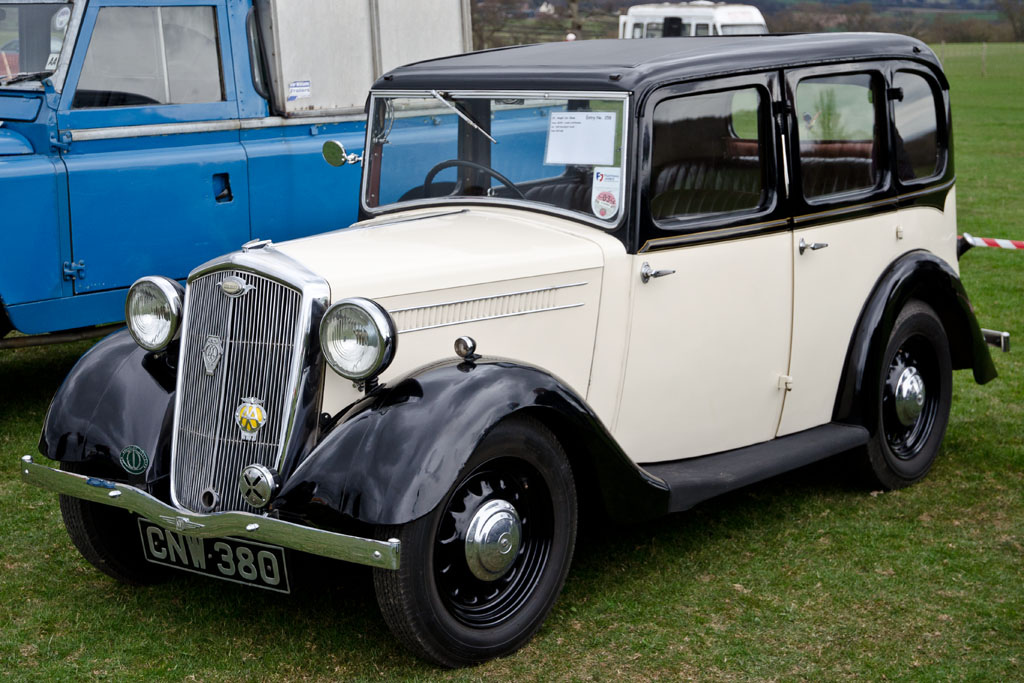
Wasp 1069 cc 1935

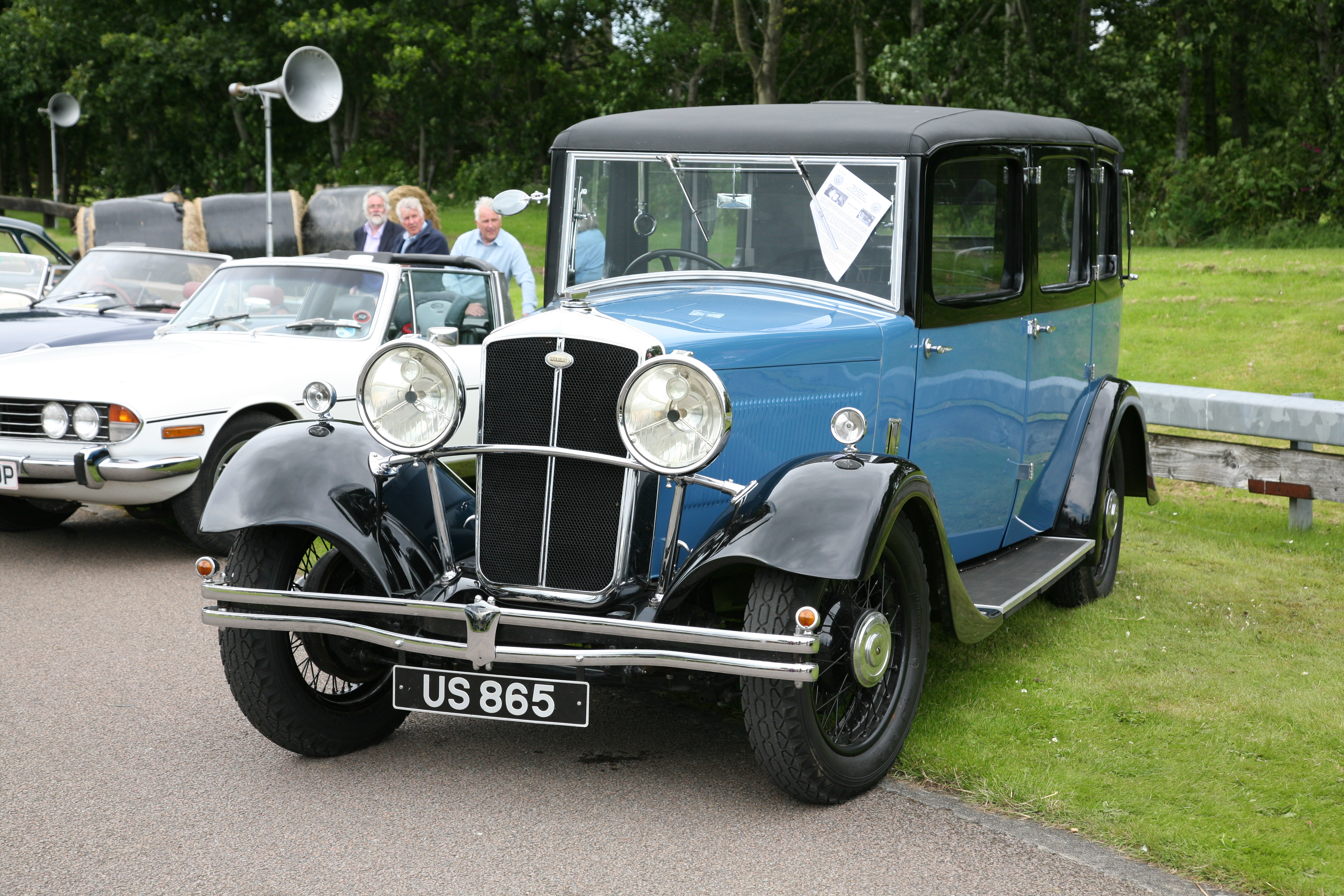
21–60 2.7-litre landaulette 1933

When Wolseley was auctioned by the receivers in February 1927 it was purchased by William Morris, later Viscount Nuffield for £730,000 using his own money. Possibly Morris acted to stop General Motors who subsequently bought Vauxhall Motors.

Other bidders beside General Motors included the Austin Motor Company. Herbert Austin, Wolseley's founder, was said to have been very distressed that he was unable to buy it. Morris had bought an early taxicab; another Wolseley link with Morris was that his Morris Garages were Wolseley agents in Oxford.

Morris had unsuccessfully tried to produce a 6-cylinder car. He still wanted his range to include a light six-cylinder car. Wolseley's 2-litre six-cylinder 16–45, their latest development of their postwar Fifteen, "made a deep impression on him".

Morris incorporated a new company, Wolseley Motors (1927) Limited, he was later permitted to remove the (1927), and consolidated its production at the sprawling Ward End Works in Birmingham. He sold off large unwanted portions of Wolseley's Adderley Park plant with all his own Soho, Birmingham works and moved Morris Commercial Cars from Soho to the remainder of Adderley Park.

In 1919 Vickers had decided Wolseley should build relatively cheap cars in large quantity – as it turned out – not the right policy. Morris changed this policy before the Wolseley brand might have lost all its luxury reputation. After lengthy deliberation and re-tooling of the works he kept the 2-litre six-cylinder 16–45 Silent Six and introduced a four-cylinder version calling it 12–32. Then an eight-cylinder car was brought to market named 21–60. In September 1928 a six-cylinder 21–60 was announced primarily aimed at the export market and named Wolseley Messenger there. It remained in production until 1935. The Messenger was noted for its robust construction. A very deep section frame reached the full width of the body – incidentally providing the sill between running boards and body. The body itself was all-steel and its prototype was first in UK to have its whole side pressed in one.

Wolseley's postwar engines were all of the single overhead-camshaft type, the camshaft driven by a vertical shaft from the crankshaft. The eight-cylinder 21–60 held the vertical shaft in the centre of the engine, and both crankshaft and camshaft were divided at their midpoints. Their smallest engine of 847cc was designed and made for Morris's new Minor at Ward End with the camshaft drive's shaft the spindle of the dynamo driven by spiral bevel gears. But it was relatively expensive to build and inclined to oil leaks, so its design was modified to a conventional side-valve layout by Morris Engines, which was put into production just for Morris cars in 1932. Meanwhile, Wolseley expanded their original design from four to six cylinders. That six-cylinder single OHC engine announced in September 1930 powered the Wolseley Hornet and several famous MG models. This tiny 6-cylinder SOHC engine eventually was made in three different sizes and its camshaft drive continued to evolve from the dynamo's spindle to, in the end, an automatically tensioned single roller chain.

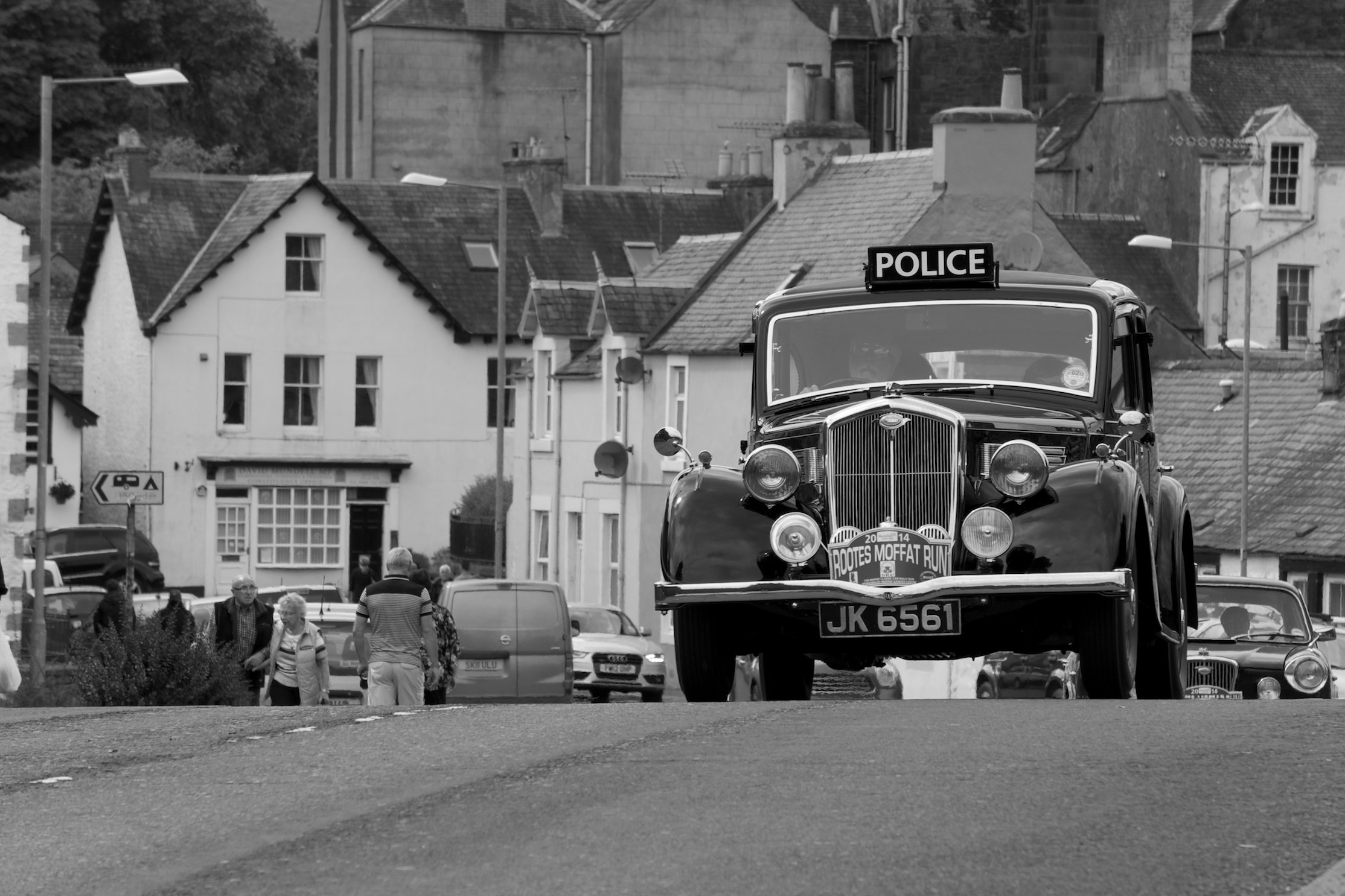
14–56 police car registered March 1937 a Morris Fourteen Six in police uniform

=== Morris Motors Limited ===
Morris transferred his personal ownership of Wolseley to Morris Motors Limited as of 1 July 1935 and shortly all Wolseley models were badge-engineered Morris designs.

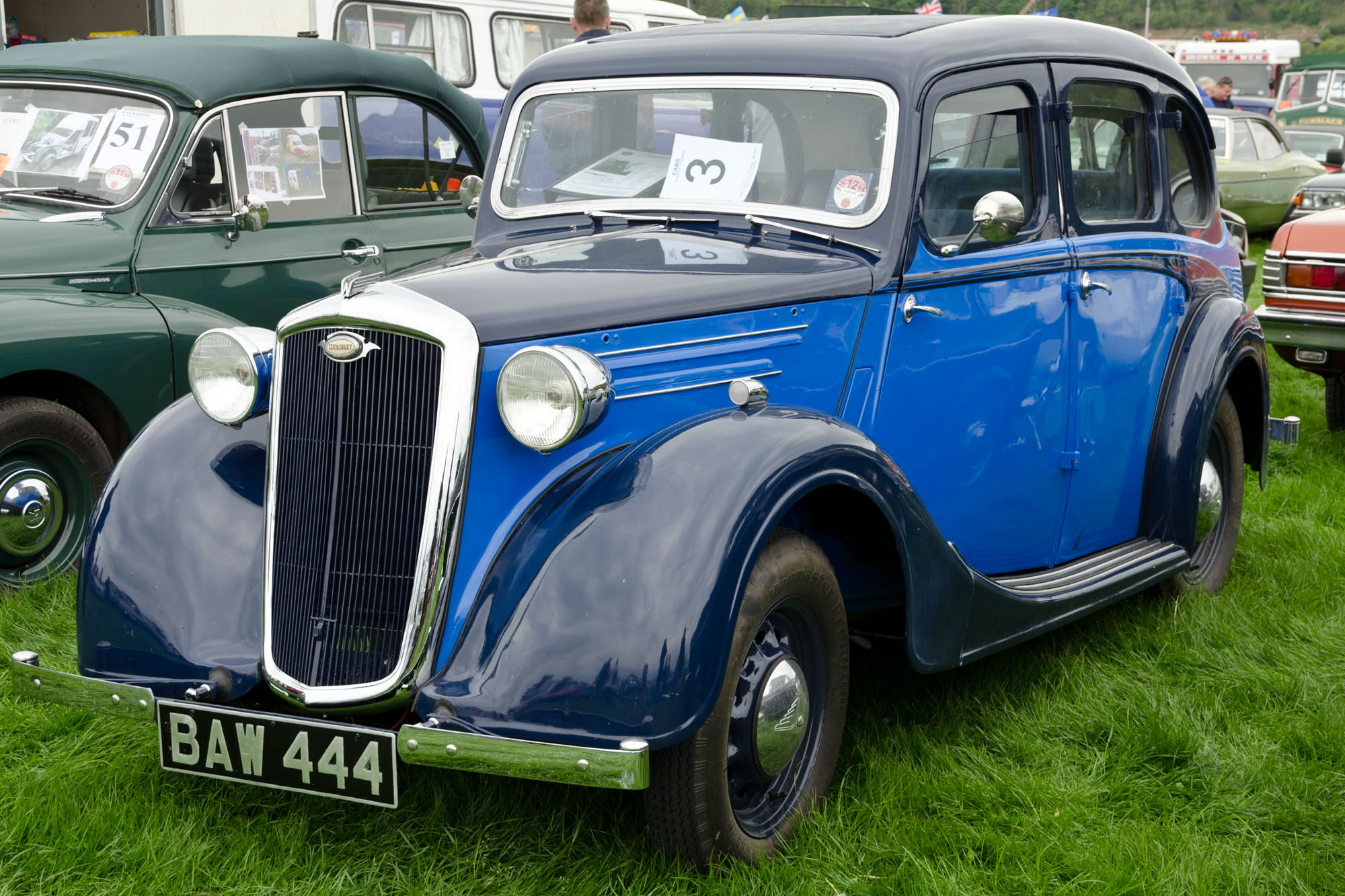
10 1140 cc saloon 1939 (Morris Ten)

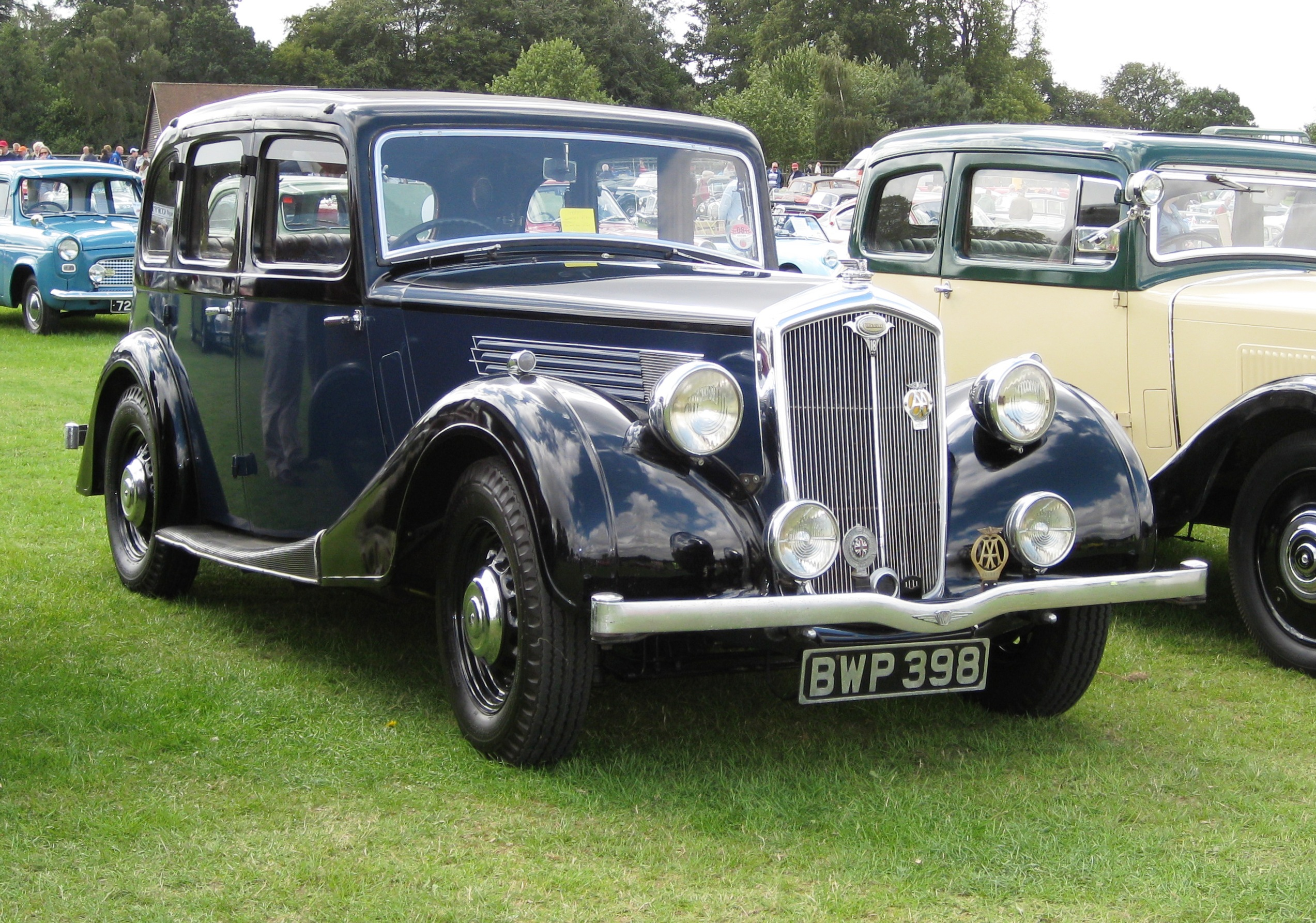
18 2¼-litre 4-door Saloon 1937 (Morris Eighteen)

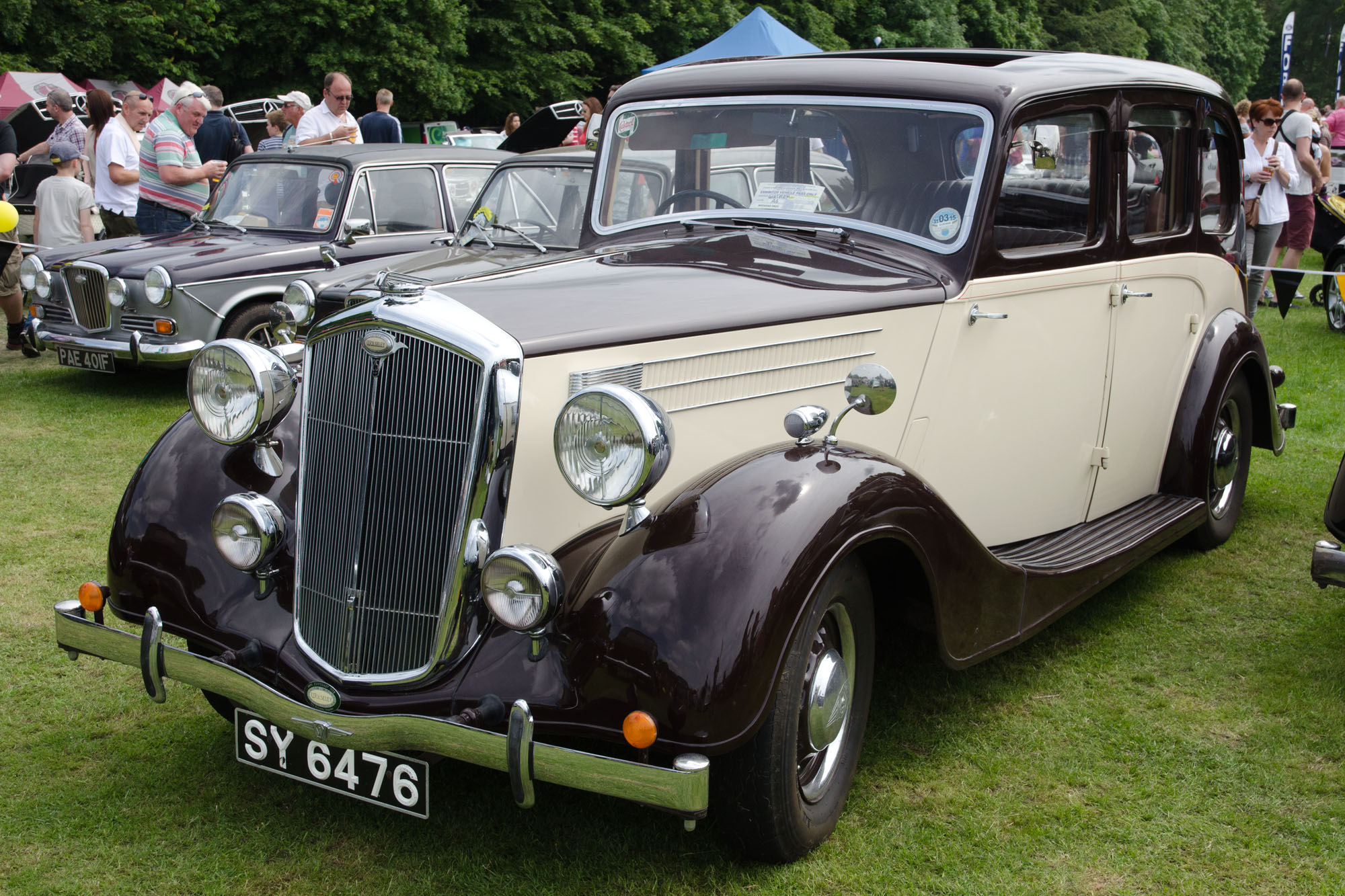
25 3½-litre saloon 1938 (Morris Twenty-Five)

Wolseley joined Morris, MG and later Riley/Autovia in the Morris Organisation later promoted as the Nuffield Organization

== Postwar ==
After the war Wolseley left Adderley Park, Morris and Wolseley production was consolidated at Cowley. The first post-war Wolseleys, the similar 4/50 and 6/80 models used overhead camshaft Wolseley engines, were otherwise based on the Morris Oxford MO and Morris Six MS but given the traditional Wolseley radiator grille. The Wolseley 6/80 was the flagship of the company and incorporated the best styling and features. The Wolseley engine of the 6/80 was also superior to the Morris delivering a higher BHP. The car was well balanced and demonstrated excellent road holding for its time. The British police used these as their squad cars well into the late sixties.

=== BMC ===
Following the merger of Austin and Morris that created the British Motor Corporation (BMC), Wolseleys shared with MG and Riley common bodies and chassis, namely the 4/44 (later 15/50) and 6/90, which were closely related to the MG Magnette ZA/ZB and the Riley Pathfinder/Two-point-Six respectively.

In 1957 the Wolseley 1500 was based on the planned successor to the Morris Minor, sharing a bodyshell with the Riley One-Point-Five. The next year, the Wolseley 15/60 debuted the new mid-sized BMC saloon design penned by Pinin Farina. It was followed by similar vehicles from five marques within the year.

The Wolseley Hornet was based on the Austin and Morris Mini with a booted body style which was shared with Riley as the Elf. The 1500 was replaced with the Wolseley 1100 (BMC ADO16) in 1965, which became the Wolseley 1300 two years later. Finally, a version of the Austin 1800 was launched in 1967 as the Wolseley 18/85.

=== British Leyland ===
After the merger of BMC and Leyland to form British Leyland in 1969 the Riley marque, long overlapping with Wolseley, was retired. Wolseley continued in diminished form with the Wolseley Six of 1972, a variant of the Austin 2200, a six-cylinder version of the Austin 1800. It was finally killed off just three years later in favour of the Wolseley variant of the wedge-shaped 18–22 series saloon, which was never even given an individual model name, being badged just "Wolseley", and sold only for seven months until that range was renamed as the Princess. This change thus spelled the end of the Wolseley marque after 74 years.

As of 2012, the Wolseley marque was owned by SAIC Motor, having been acquired by its subsidiary Nanjing Automobile following the break-up of the MG Rover Group.

== List of Wolseley vehicles ==
=== List of 1920s and 1930s Wolseley vehicles ===
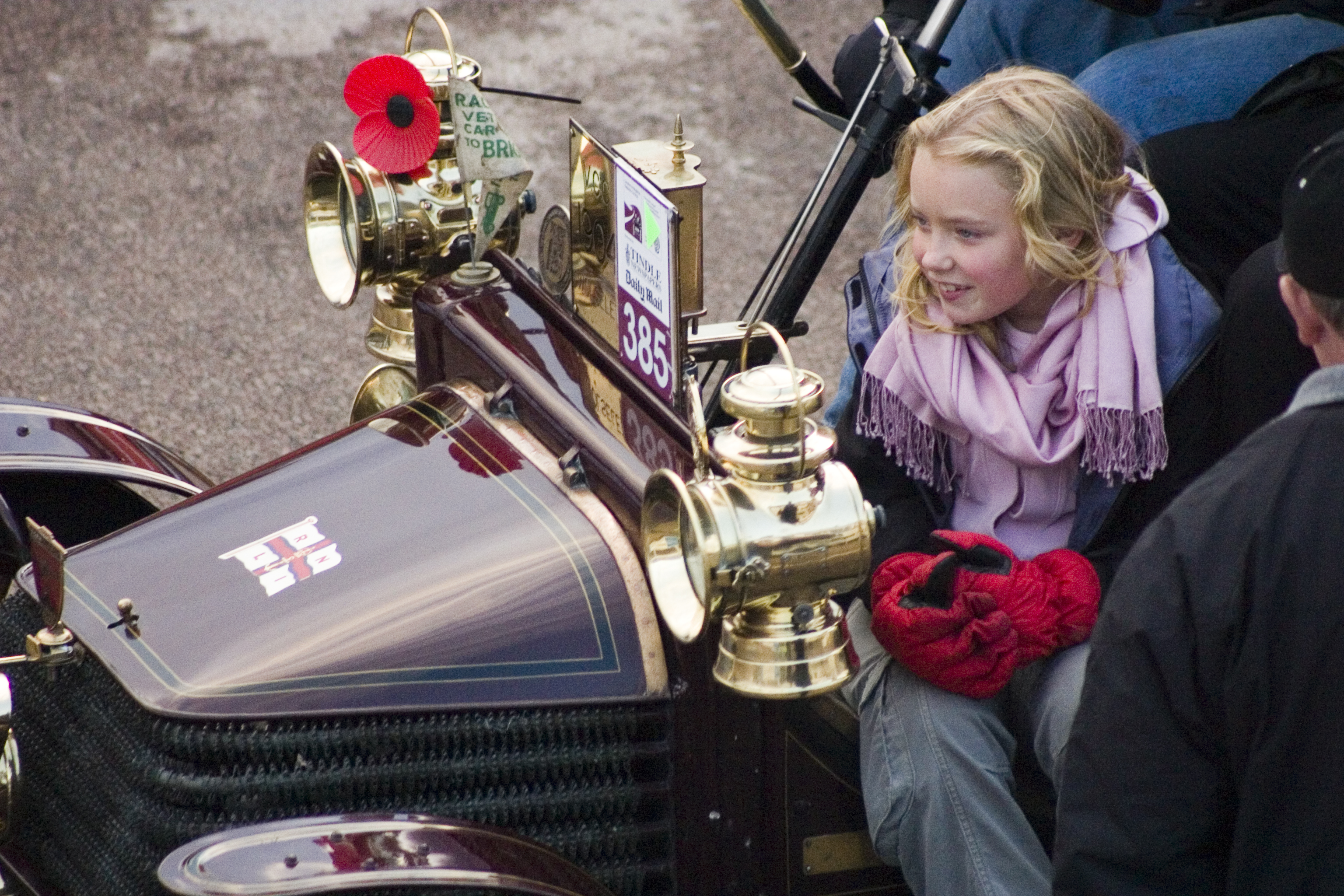
Six open 2-seater 1904

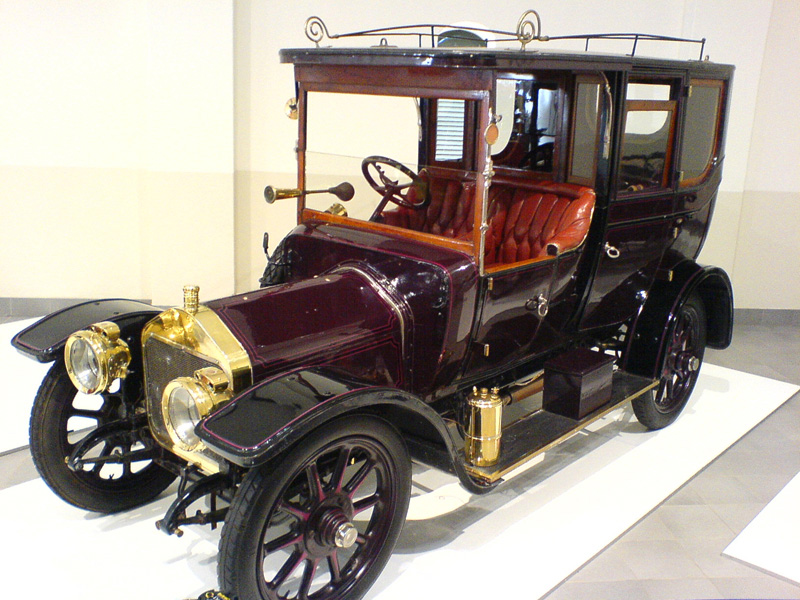
12/16 limousine 1910

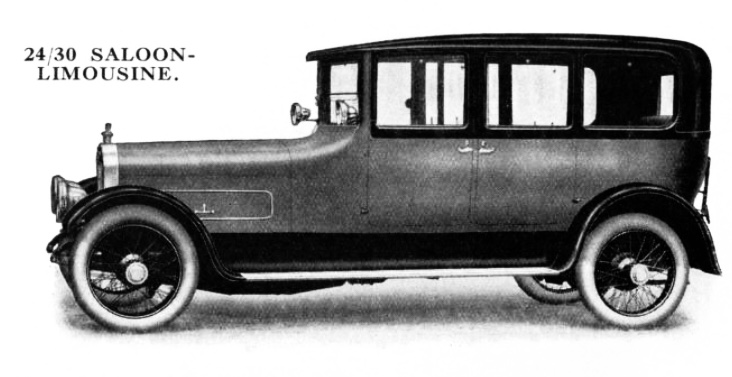
Wolseley 24-30 (1922-1924)

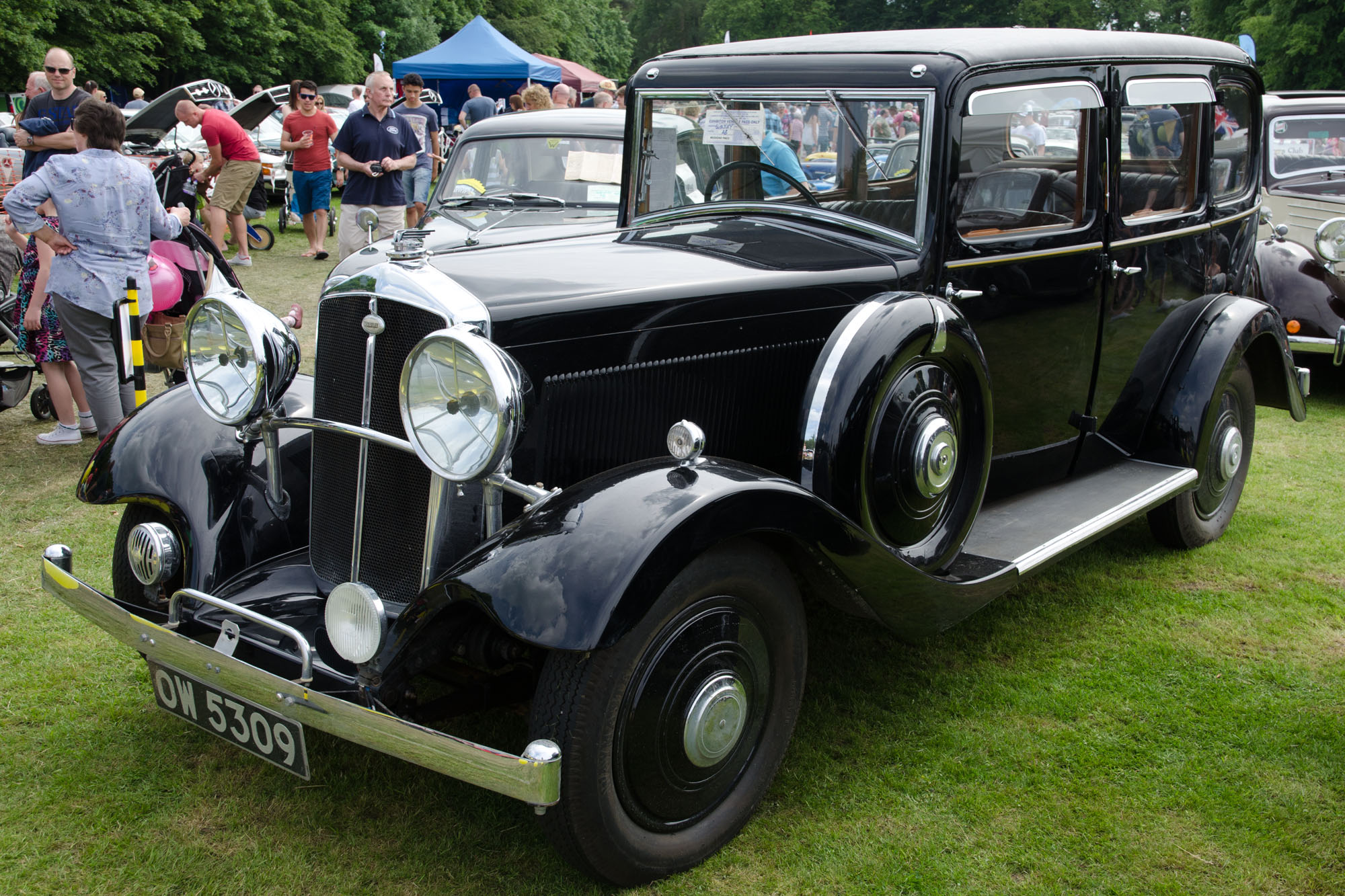
21/60 saloon 1934

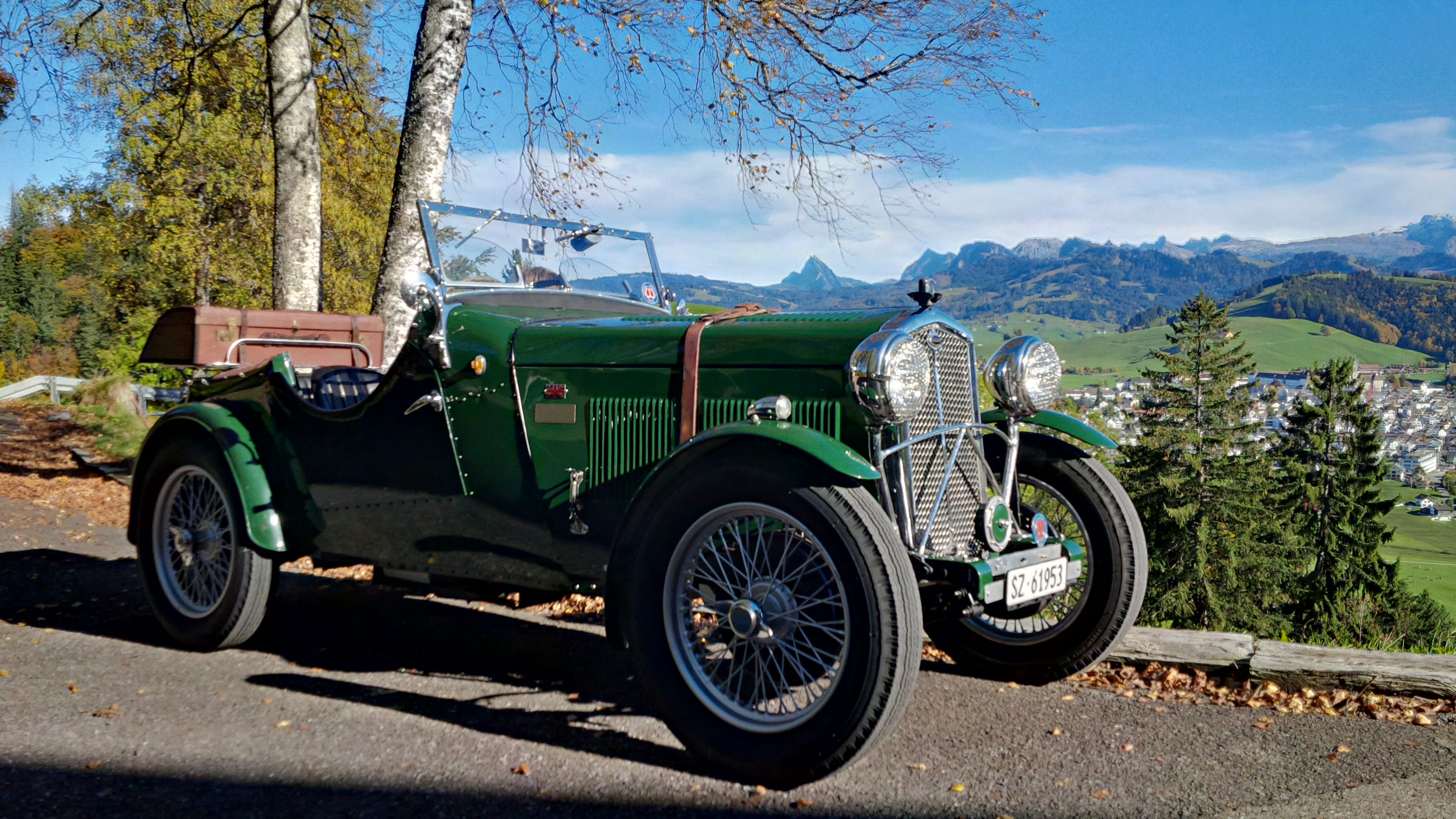
Hornet Special open 2-seater 1933

- Four-cylinder
  - 1919–1923 Wolseley Seven
  - 1919–1924 Wolseley Ten
  - 1919–1924 Wolseley Fifteen
  - 1922–1924 Wolseley Fourteen
  - 1924–1928 Wolseley 11/22
  - 1924–1927 Wolseley 16/35
  - 1929–1930 Wolseley 12/32
  - 1934–1935 Wolseley Nine
  - 1935–1936 Wolseley Wasp
  - 1936–1937 Wolseley 10/40
  - 1936–1939 Wolseley 12/48
  - 1939-1939 Wolseley Ten
- Six-cylinder
  - 1919–1924 Wolseley Twenty
  - 1922–1924 Wolseley 24/30
  - 1924–1927 Wolseley 24/55
  - 1930–1936 Wolseley Hornet six OHC
  - 1927–1931 Wolseley 16/45
  - 1927–1935 Wolseley 21/60 Six
  - 1931–1932 Wolseley Viper (car)
  - 1928–1930 Wolseley 12/32
  - 1933–1935 Wolseley County
  - 1933–1935 Wolseley Sixteen
  - 1935–1936 Wolseley Fourteen
  - 1935-1935 Wolseley Eighteen
  - 1936–1938 Wolseley 14/56
  - 1937–1938 Wolseley 18/80
  - 1935–1937 Wolseley Super Six 16HP, 21HP, 25HP
  - 1938–1941 Wolseley 14/60
  - 1938–1941 Wolseley 16/65
  - 1938–1941 Wolseley 18/85 (also produced in 1944, for the military)
  - 1937–1940 Wolseley 16HP, 21HP, 25HP
- Eight-cylinder
  - 1928–1931 Wolseley 21/60 Straight Eight Overhead Cam 2700cc (536 produced)
  - 1929–1930 Wolseley 32/80 Straight Eight Overhead Cam 4020cc (chassis only)

=== List of post-World War II Wolseley vehicles ===
Wolseley often used a two-number system of model names. Until 1948, the first number was engine size in units of taxable horsepower as defined by the Royal Automobile Club. Thus, the 14/60 was rated at 14 hp (RAC) for tax purposes but actually produced 60 hp (45 kW). Later, the first number equalled the number of cylinders. After 1956, this number was changed to reflect the engine's displacement for four-cylinder cars. Therefore, the seminal 15/60 was a 1.5-litre engine capable of producing 60 hp (45 kW). Eventually, the entire naming system was abandoned.

- Four-cylinder

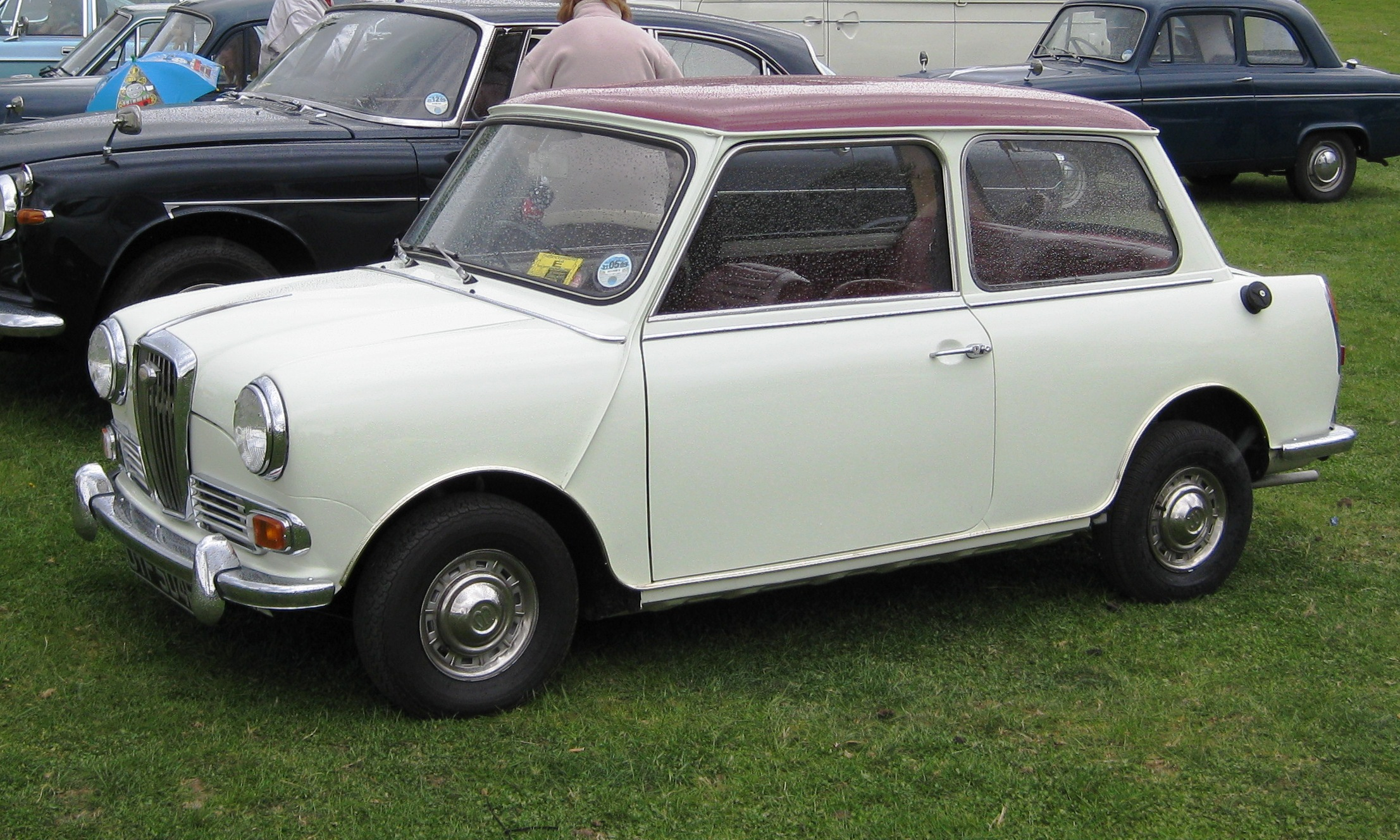
The 1961–69 Wolseley Hornet was based on the Mini.

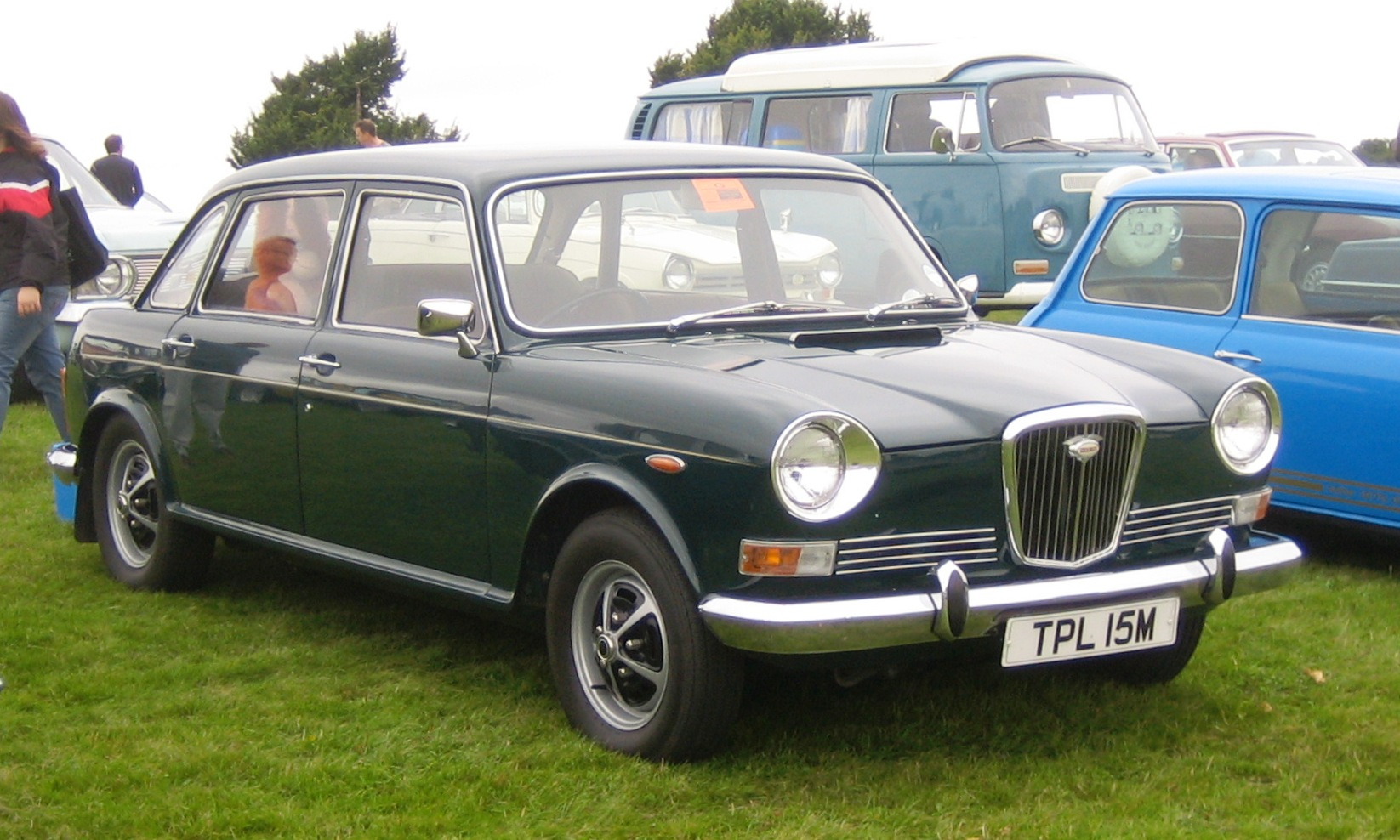
Wolseley Six (BMC ADO17)

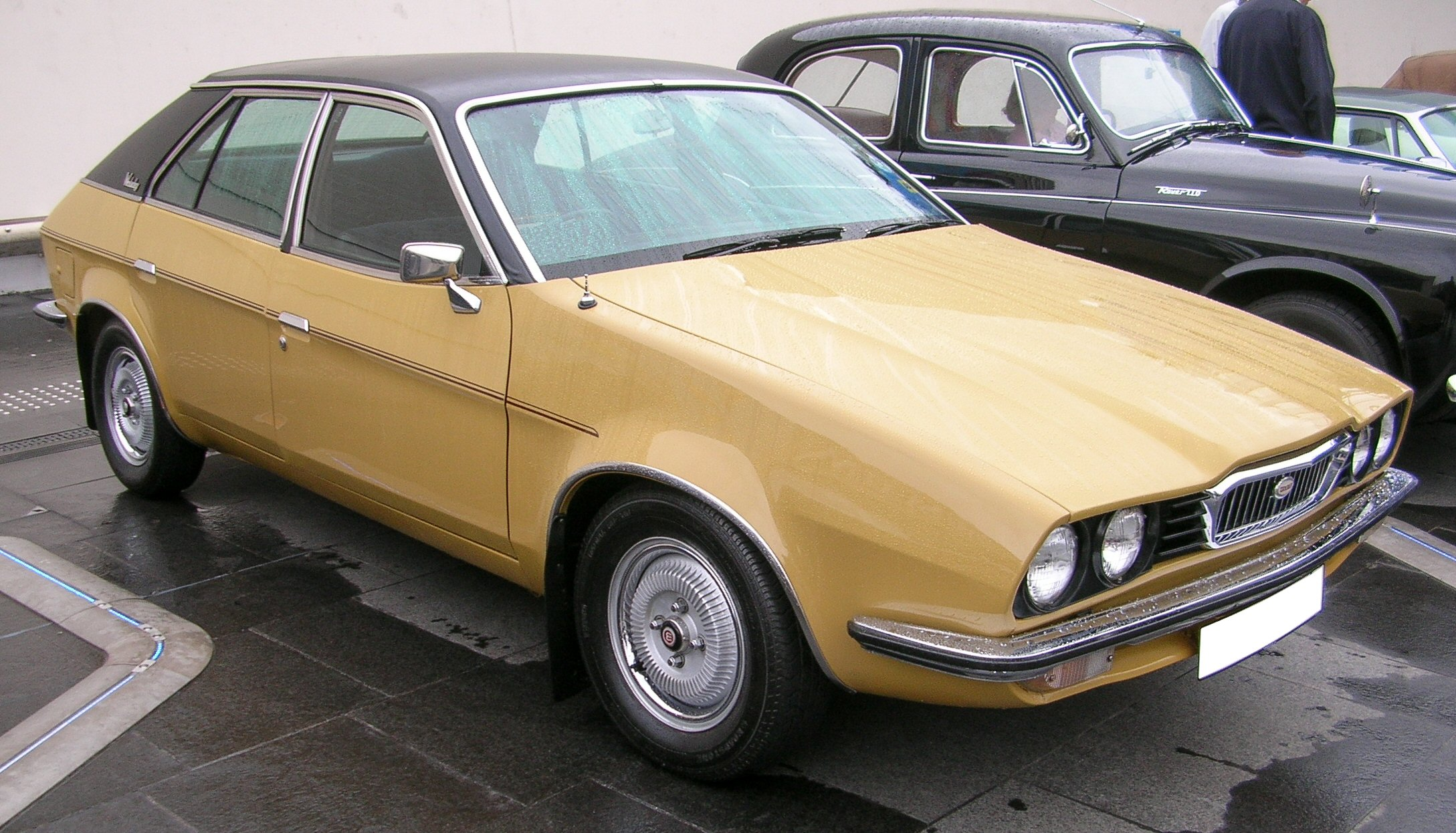
Wolseley (18–22 series)

  - 1939–1948 Wolseley Ten (Morris Ten)
  - 1937–1948 Wolseley 12/48 (Post war version was the Series III)
  - 1946–1948 Wolseley Eight similar to Morris Eight Series E
  - 1947–1955 Nuffield Oxford Taxi (Morris Commercial design)
  - 1948–1953 Wolseley 4/50 similar to Morris Oxford MO
  - 1952–1956 Wolseley 4/44
  - 1956–1958 Wolseley 15/50 (MG Magnette ZB)
  - 1957–1965 Wolseley 1500 (similar to Riley One-Point-Five, based on Morris Minor)
  - 1958–1961 Wolseley 15/60 (Austin A55 (Mark 2) Cambridge)
  - 1961–1969 Wolseley Hornet (similar to Riley Elf, based on Mini)
  - 1961–1971 Wolseley 16/60 (Austin A60 Cambridge)
  - 1965–1974 Wolseley 1100/1300
  - 1967–1971 Wolseley 18/85
  - 1968–???? Wolseley 11/55 (South African variant of ADO16)
- Six-cylinder
  - 1938–1948 Wolseley 14/60 (Post war version was the Series III)
  - 1938–1948 Wolseley 18/85 (Post war version was the Series III)
  - 1938–1948 Wolseley 25 (Post war version was the Series III)
  - 1948–1954 Wolseley 6/80 (Morris Six)
  - 1954–1959 Wolseley 6/90 (Riley Pathfinder/Riley Two-Point-Six)
  - 1959–1961 Wolseley 6/99 (Austin A99 Westminster)
  - 1961–1968 Wolseley 6/110 (Austin A110 Westminster)
  - 1962–1965 Wolseley 24/80 (Australian version of 15/60 and 16/60, but six-cylinder; similar to Austin Freeway)
  - 1972–1975 Wolseley Six (BMC ADO17)
  - March–October 1975 Wolseley saloon (18–22 series)
- Also produced (dates to be confirmed):
  - Wolseley 4/60 (Dutch version of 16/60)
  - Wolseley 300 (Danish version of 6/99 and 6/110)

== Aero engines ==
Wolseley also produced a number of aircraft engine designs, although there were no major design wins.

- Wolseley 30 hp 4-cyl. - 1908
- Wolseley 50 hp V-8 air-cooled - 1909
- Wolseley 54 hp V-8 water-cooled 3.74" x 5.00", 1909
- Wolseley 80 hp Type B - 1910
- Wolseley 60 hp Type C V-8
- Wolseley 160 hp V-8 - 1912
- Wolseley Aquarius also known as A.R.7 - 1933
- Wolseley Aries, also known as A.R.9 - 1933
  - Wolseley Scorpio - 250 hp version of AR9
  - Wolseley Leo - 280 hp version of AR9, not flown
  - Wolseley Libra - 390 hp version of AR9, not flown
- Wolseley Python - 1917
- Wolseley Viper - 1918
- Wolseley Adder - 1918

Wolseley Aero Engines Ltd. was a subsidiary formed around 1931 to design aero engines. When Wolseley Motors Limited was transferred to Morris Motors Limited on 1 July 1935 this part of its business was set aside by William Morris, Lord Nuffield and put in the ownership of a newly incorporated company, Wolseley Aero Engines Ltd, and remained his personal property. By 1942 the name of that company had become Nuffield Mechanizations Limited.

They were developing an advanced Wolseley radial aero engine of about 250 horsepower, but the project was abandoned in September 1936 when Nuffield got the fixed price I.T.P. (Intention to Proceed) contract papers (which would have required an army of chartered accountants) and decided to deal only with the War Office and Admiralty, not the Air Ministry (see Airspeed).

== See also ==
- Arthur John McCormack
- Wolseley Racing
- The Wolseley restaurant in the ground floor showrooms of Wolseley House, 160 Piccadilly, London
- List of aircraft engine manufacturers
- List of car manufacturers of the United Kingdom
