= MG Magnette =

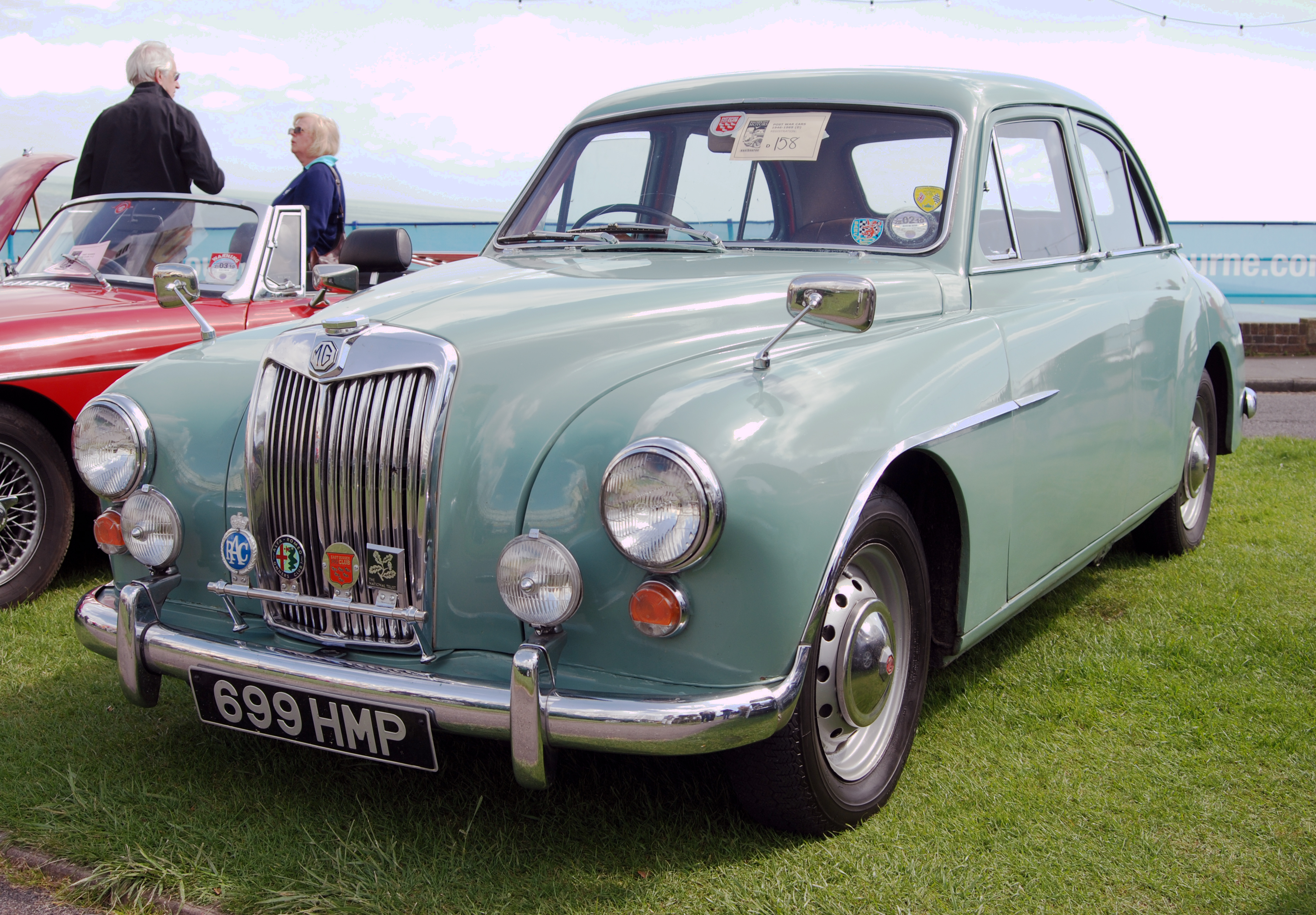
- 1956 ZA

Overview
- Manufacturer: MG (BMC)
- Production: 1953–1968
- Assembly: Abingdon-on-Thames, Berkshire, England

Body and chassis
- Class: Large family car
- Body style: 4-door saloon
- Layout: FR layout

Chronology
- Predecessor: MG YB

The MG Magnette is a car that was produced by MG between 1953 and 1968. The Magnette was manufactured in two build series, the ZA and ZB of 1953 through to 1958 and the Mark III and Mark IV of 1959 through to 1968, both using a modified Wolseley body and an Austin engine.

MG Cars had previously used the Magnette name on their K-type and N-type models of the 1930s.

== Magnette ZA ==
MG Magnette ZA
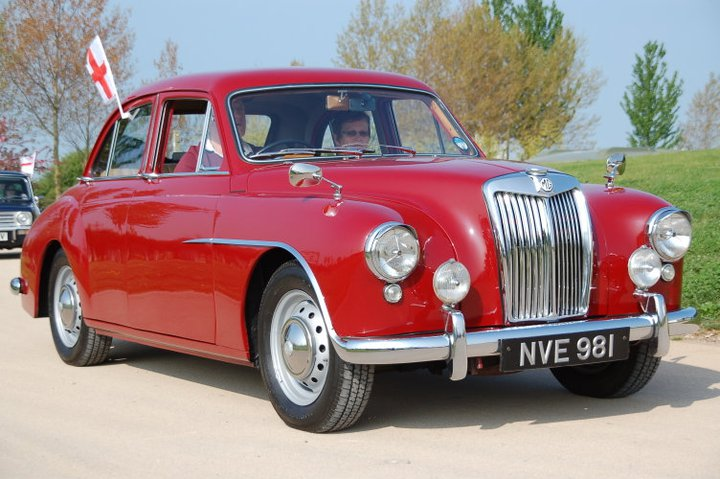

Overview
- Production: 1953–1956
- Designer: Gerald Palmer

Powertrain
- Engine: 1.5 L B-Series I4
- Transmission: 4-speed manual

Dimensions
- Wheelbase: 2,591 mm (102.0 in)
- Length: 4,267 mm (168.0 in)
- Width: 1,600 mm (63.0 in)
- Height: 58 in (1,473 mm)

The Magnette ZA was announced on 15 October 1953 and debuted at the 1953 London Motor Show. Deliveries started in March 1954. Production continued until 1956, when 18,076 had been built. It was the first unibody car to bear the MG badge.

The Magnette was designed by Gerald Palmer, designer of the Jowett Javelin. It was the first appearance of the new four cylinder 1,489 cc (90.9 cu in) B-Series I4 engine with a pair of 1 1/4 in (32 mm)-bore twin-choke SU carburettors, delivering 60 bhp (45 kW), driving the rear wheels through BMC's new four-speed manual gearbox with synchromesh on the top three ratios.

Suspension was independent at the front using coil springs and had a live axle with half elliptic leaf springs at the rear. The steering was by rack and pinion. Hydraulically operated Lockheed 10 in (254 mm) drum brakes were fitted to front and rear wheels. When leaving the factory the Magnette ZA optionally fitted the recently developed belted textile-braced, radial-ply Pirelli Cinturato 145HR15 tyres (CA67) but had 5.5-15 Dunlop tyres as standard.

The car had leather trimmed individual front seats and rear bench seat. The dashboard and door cappings were in polished wood. Although the heater was standard, the radio was still an optional extra. Standard body colours were black, maroon, green, and grey.

The similar Wolseley 4/44, first sold one year earlier, used the 1250 cc engine from the MG TF. Although visually similar, the MG has lower suspension and only the front doors, boot lid, and roof panels are shared. The 4/44 was replaced in 1956 by the 15/50.

In 1955, The Motor tested a Magnette and recorded a top speed of 79.7 mph (128.3 km/h) acceleration from 0-60 mph (97 km/h) in 23.1 seconds and a fuel consumption of 24.9 miles per imperial gallon (11.3 L/100 km; 20.7 mpg_{‑US}) was recorded. The test car cost £914 including taxes.

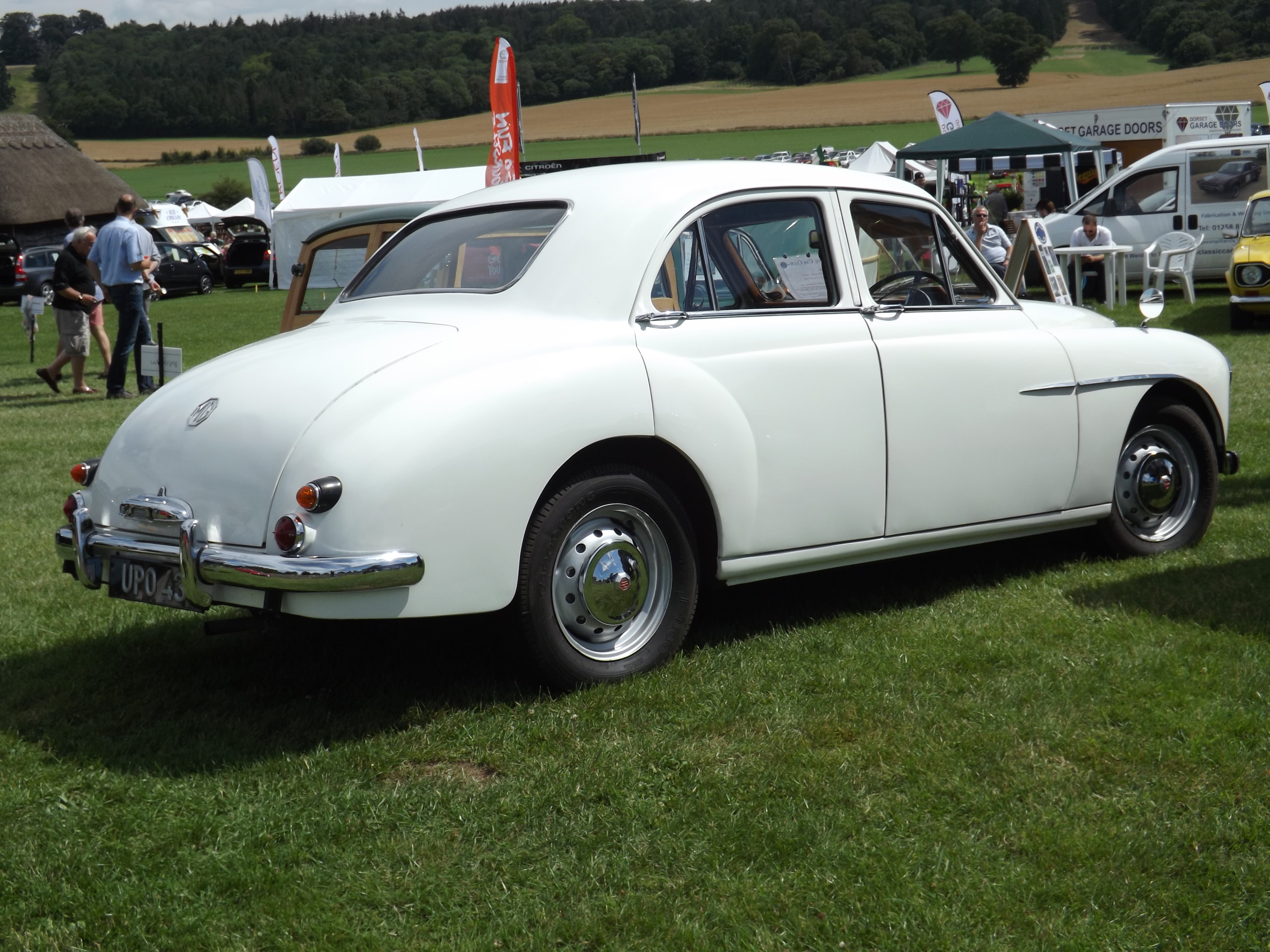
1955 ZA showing direction indicators

== Magnette ZB ==
MG Magnette ZB
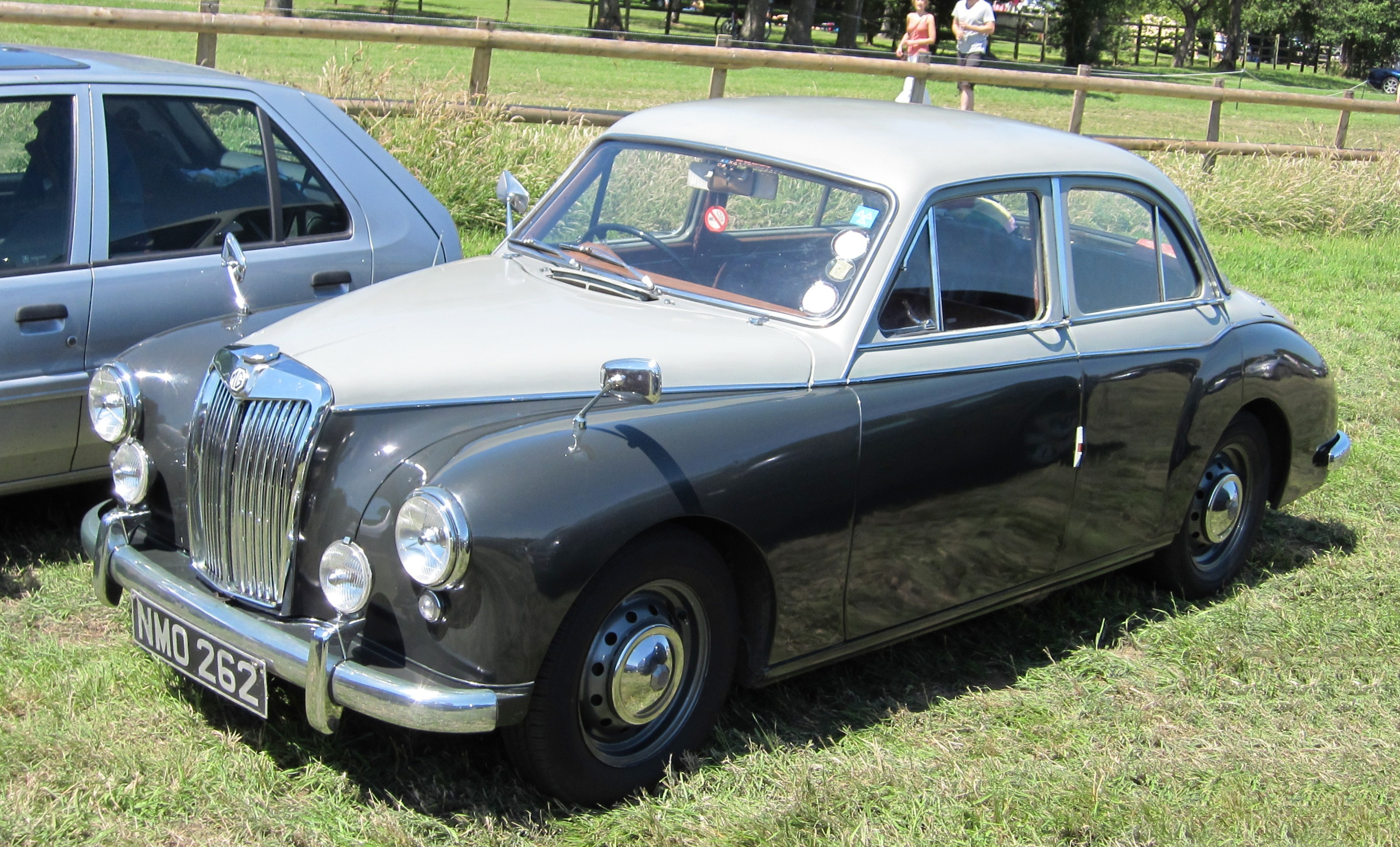

Overview
- Production: 1956–1958

Powertrain
- Engine: 1.5 L BMC B-Series I4

The ZA was replaced by the Magnette ZB that was announced on 12 October 1956. Power was increased to 64 hp (48 kW) fitting 1 1/2 in (38 mm)-bore carburettors, increasing the compression ratio from 7.5 to 8.3, and modifying the manifold. The extra power increased the top speed to 86 mph (138 km/h) and reduced the 0–60 mph (0–97 km/h) time to 18.5 seconds. The similar Wolseley 15/50 now shared the ZB's B-Series engine.

A semi-automatic transmission, marketed as Manumatic, was fitted as an option on 496 1957 Magnettes.

A Varitone model featured larger rear window and optional two tone paintwork, using a standard Pressed Steel body shell, the rear window opening enlarged in the Morris Motors body shop, Cowley, before painting. 18,524 ZBs were built.

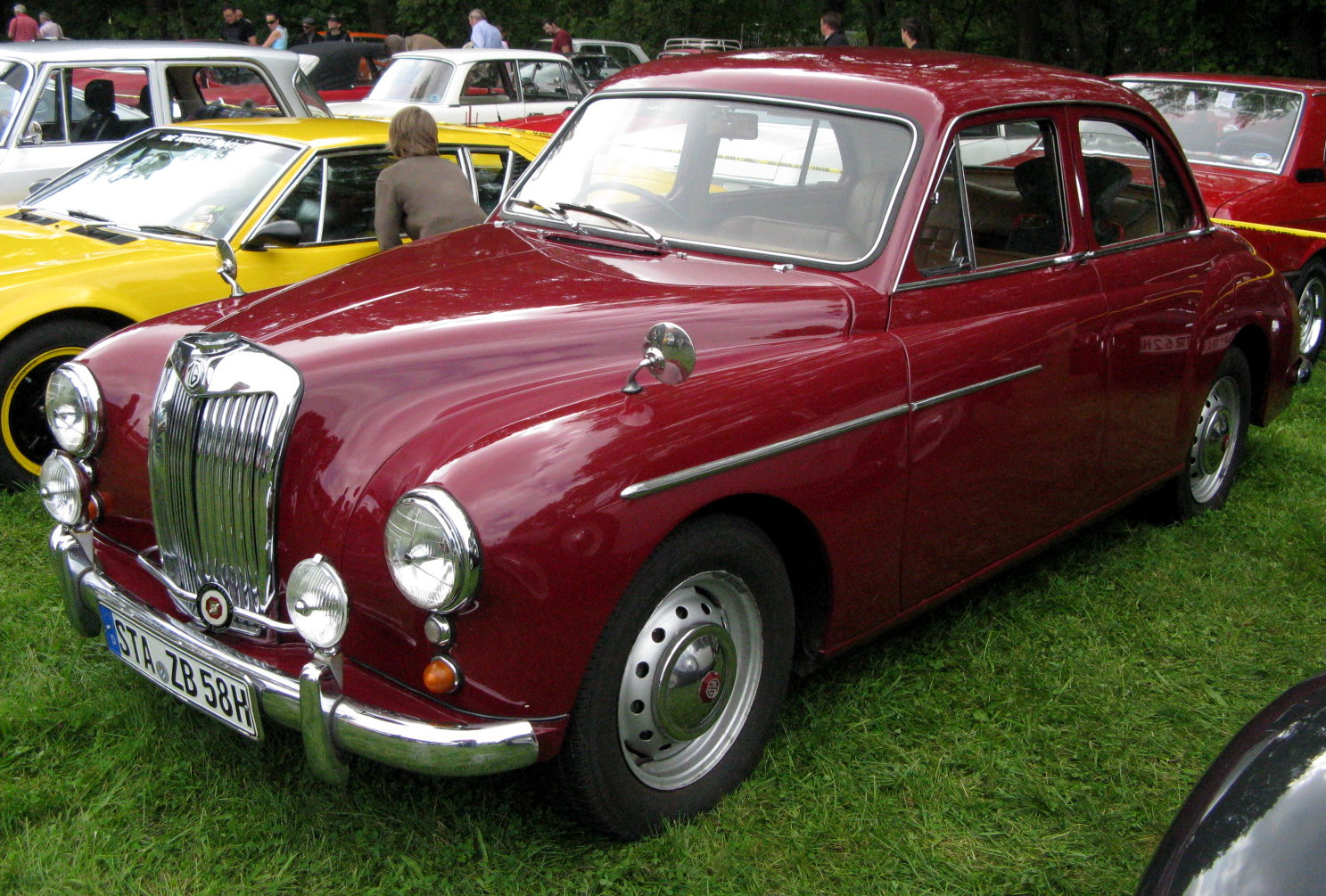
1958 ZB monochrome

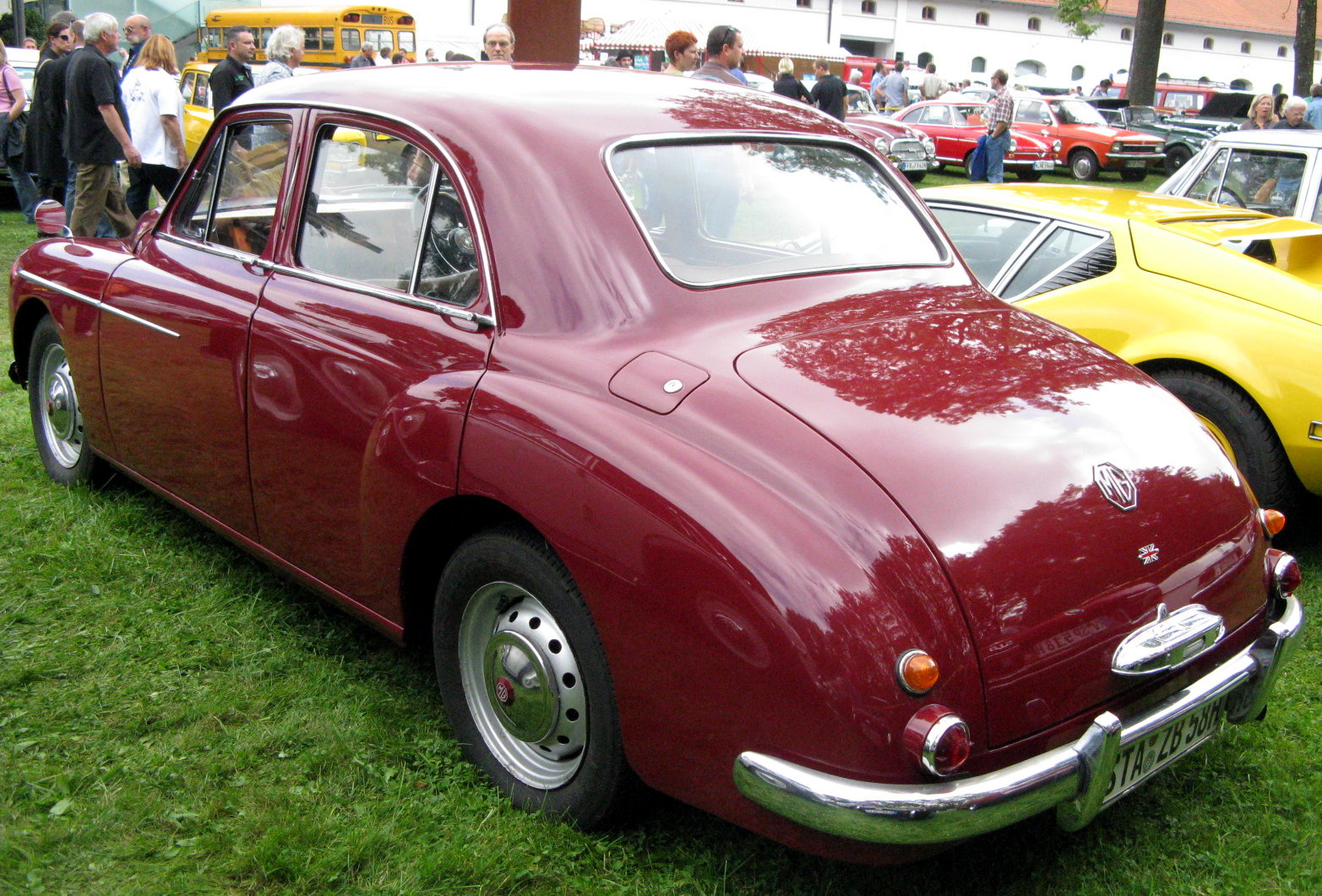
1958 ZB monochrome
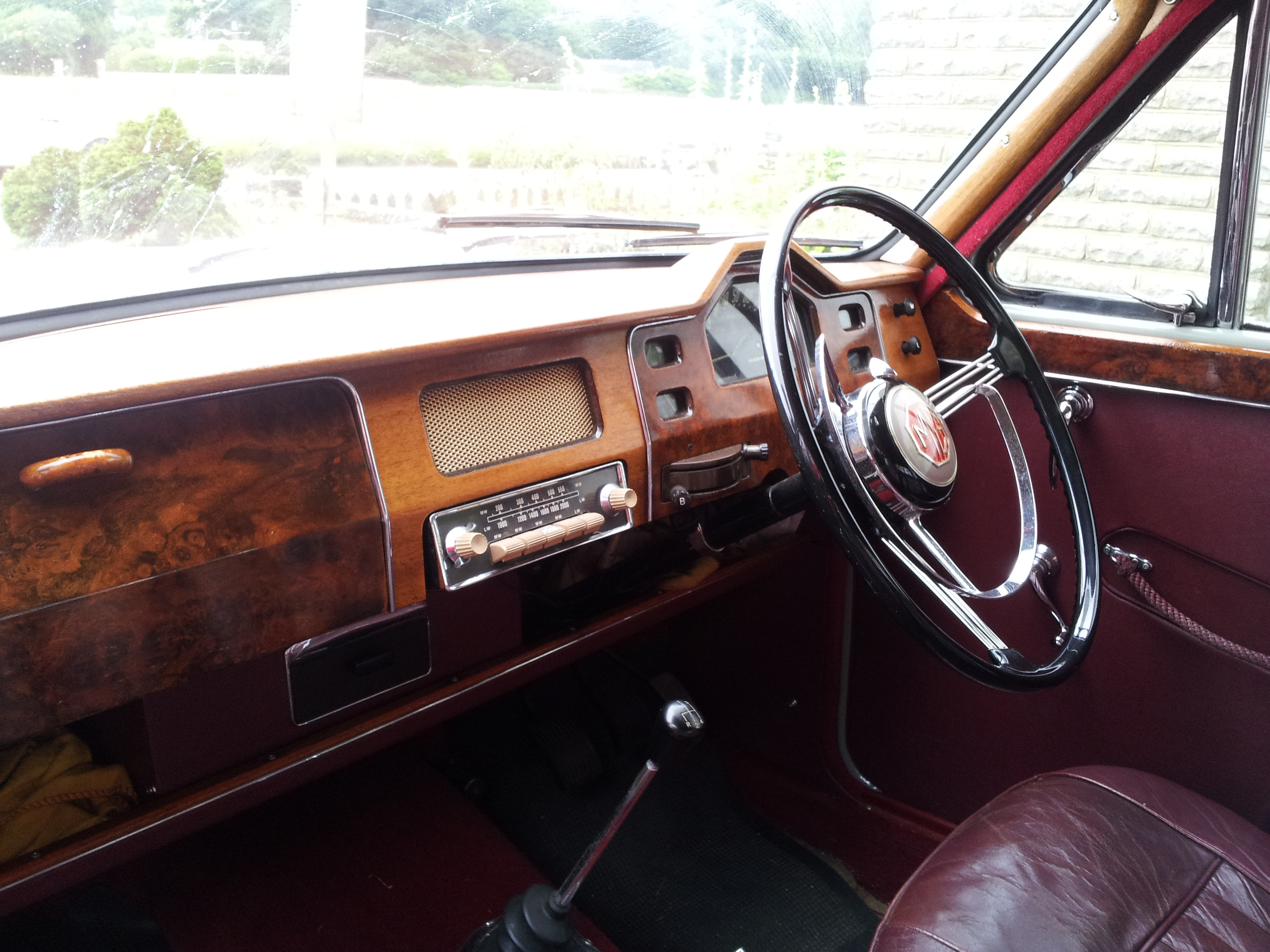
ZB Varitone instruments

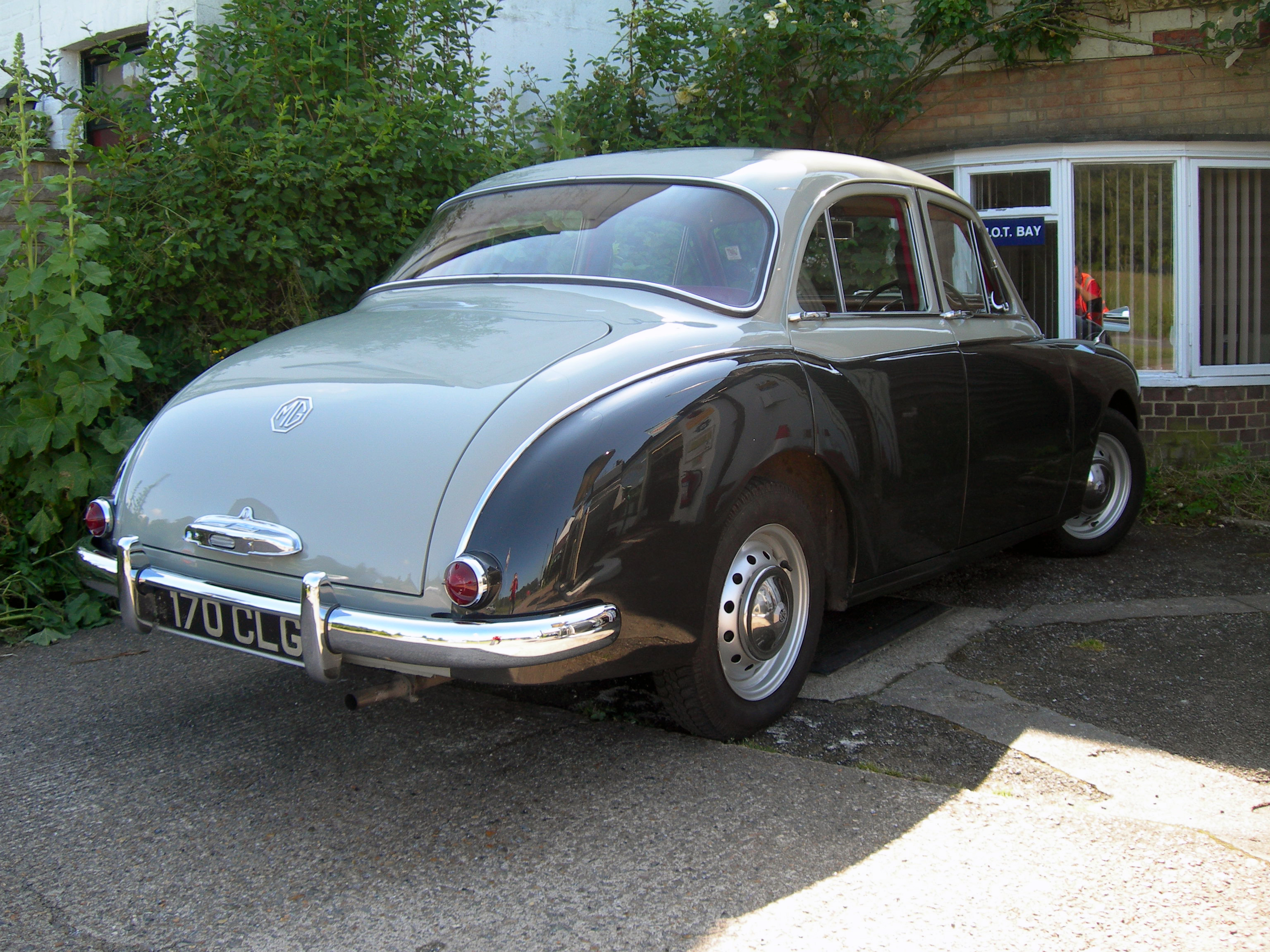
ZB Varitone wraparound

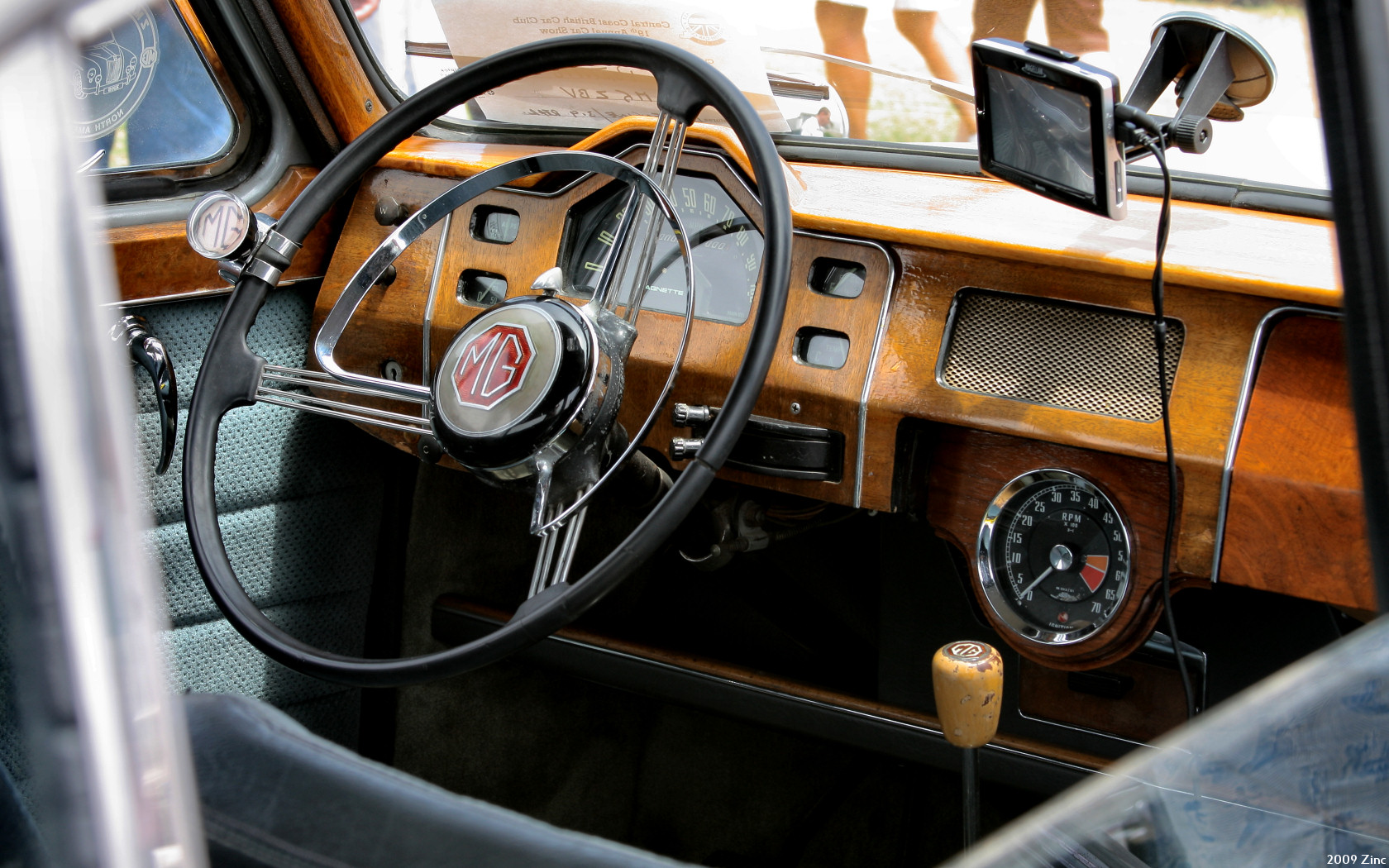
ZB Varitone instruments

== Magnette Mark III ==
MG Magnette Mark III
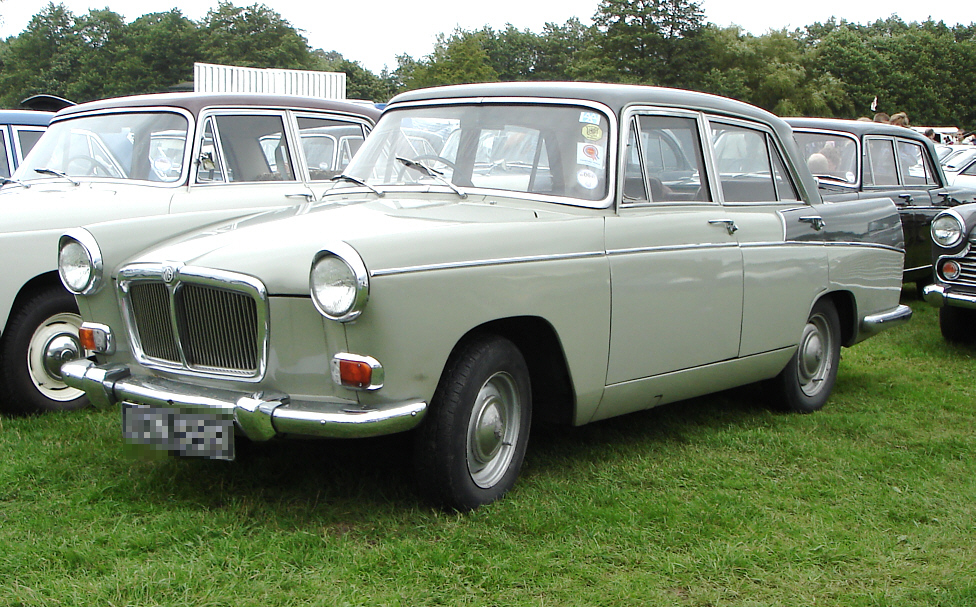

Overview
- Production: 1959–1961
- Designer: Pinin Farina

Body and chassis
- Related: Morris Oxford V Riley 4/68; Austin A55 Cambridge; Wolseley 15/60

Powertrain
- Engine: 1.5 L B-Series I4

Dimensions
- Wheelbase: 2,521 mm (99.3 in)
- Length: 4,521 mm (178.0 in)
- Width: 1,613 mm (63.5 in)

The Mark III announced 2 February 1959 was nearly identical to the Riley version (the 4/68) of the new Pinin Farina-designed midsize BMC saloon line. They both had truncated tail fins.

All versions (including the Austin A55 Cambridge Mark II, Morris Oxford V and Wolseley 15/60) were produced by the British Motor Corporation (BMC).

The car featured BMC's 1489 cc B type engine but, in the MG Magnette III (and its Riley sibling), performance was enhanced by fitting twin S.U. H.D.4 carburetters.

The interior featured a walnut veneer facia panel, door cappings and leather upholstery as well as safety glass windows.

A Mark III was tested by The Motor magazine in 1959. They recorded a top speed of 85.5 mph (137.6 km/h), acceleration from 0-60 mph (97 km/h) in 19.7 seconds and a fuel consumption of 31.4 miles per imperial gallon (9.0 L/100 km; 26.1 mpg_{‑US}). The test car cost £1012 including taxes. 16,676 Mark IIIs were built.

== Magnette Mark IV ==
MG Magnette Mark IV
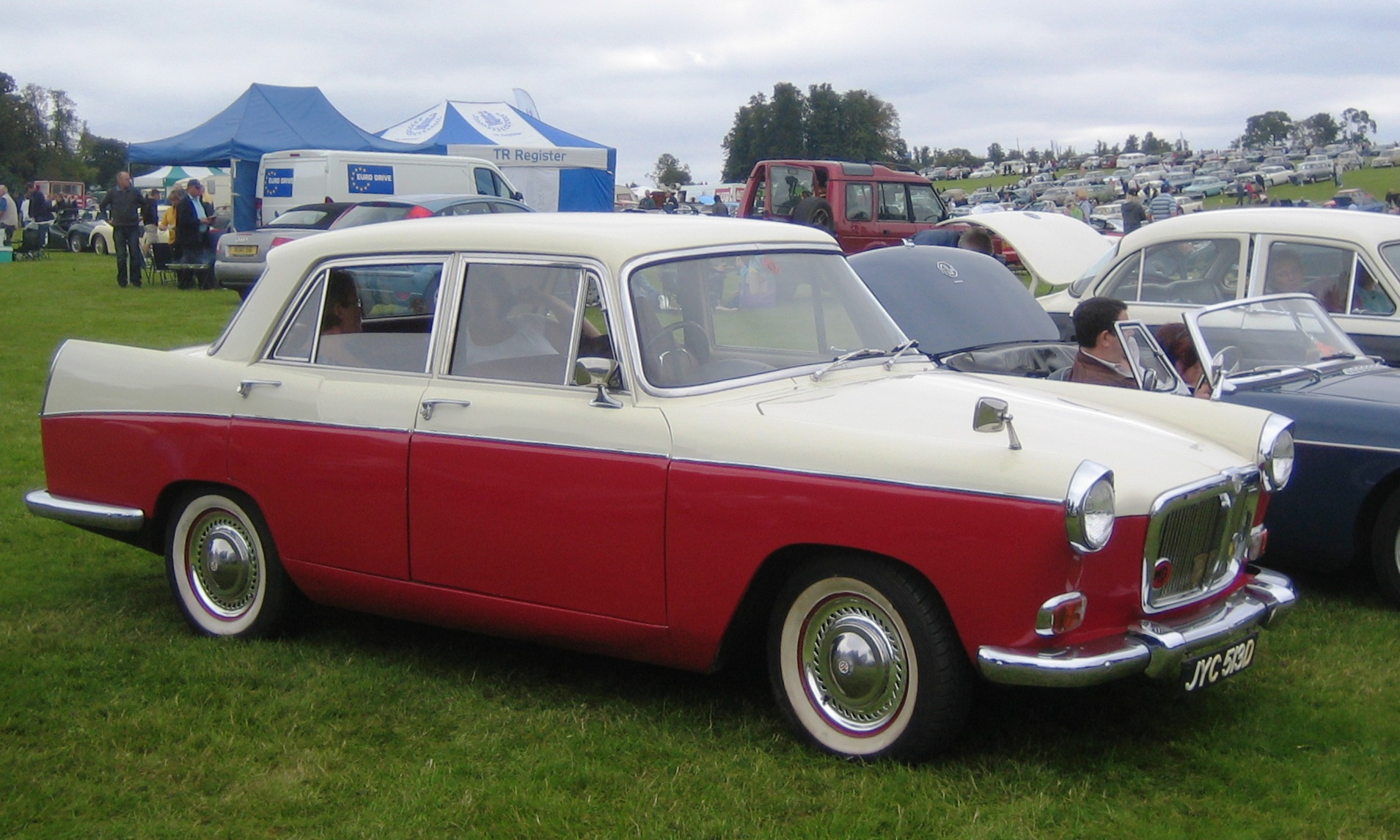

Overview
- Production: 1961–1969

Body and chassis
- Related: Morris Oxford VI; Riley 4/72; Austin A60 Cambridge; Wolseley 16/60; Siam Magnette 1622

Powertrain
- Engine: 1.6 L B-Series I4

Dimensions
- Wheelbase: 2,546 mm (100.2 in)

The Mark III was updated in 1961 as the Mark IV. A larger 1.6 L (1622 cc) B-Series engine, with capacity increased by increasing the bore to 76.2 mm, was fitted, and the car had a longer wheelbase and wider track. To improve handling anti-roll bars were fitted front and rear. From the outside, the Mark IV was almost identical to the Mark III, apart from the remodelled and slightly less sharply pointed tailfins, a modification shared with its Riley sibling.

Automatic transmission was offered as an option.

The model continued to be listed through till May 1968 when the manufacturers announced that production had ceased with "no immediate replacement ... contemplated". 14,320 Mark IVs were built.

== Other cars carrying the Magnette name ==
In 2011, MG Motor confirmed that the saloon version of the MG 6 would carry the Magnette name for the UK, Europe and China.

At the media launch held at the historic Goodwood Circuit, MG Motor displayed the MG 6 Magnette alongside examples of the earlier ZA and ZB Magnettes to reinforce the continuity of the brand.
