= Wolseley 15/50 =

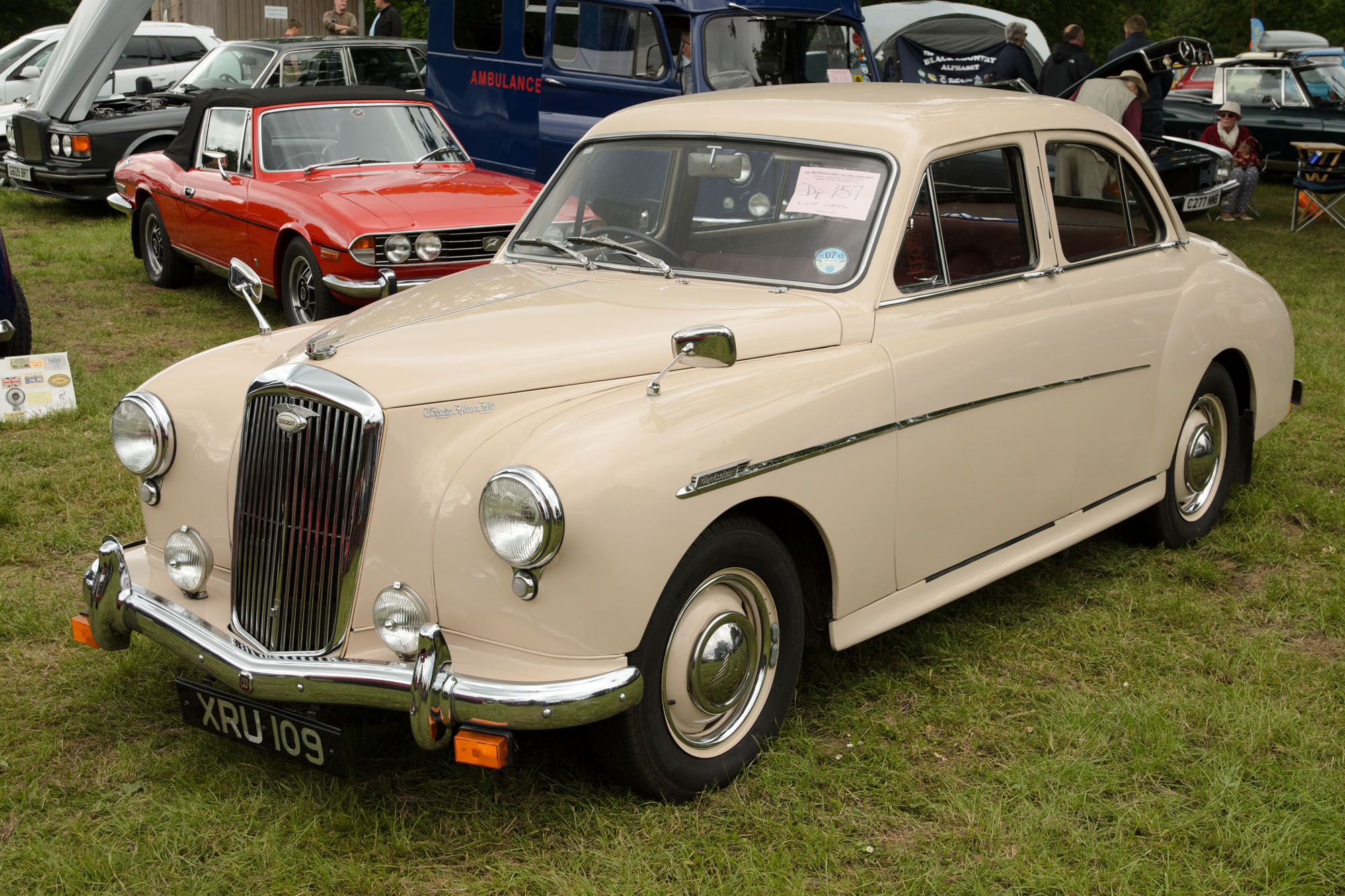

Overview
- Manufacturer: BMC
- Production: 1956–1958; 12,352 built
- Designer: Gerald Palmer

Body and chassis
- Body style: 4-door saloon
- Related: MG Magnette

Powertrain
- Engine: 1489 cc B-Series straight-4
- Transmission: 4-speed manual

Dimensions
- Wheelbase: 102 in (2,591 mm)
- Length: 173 in (4,394 mm)
- Width: 61.5 in (1,562 mm)
- Height: 60 in (1,524 mm)

Chronology
- Predecessor: Wolseley 4/44
- Successor: Wolseley 15/60

The Wolseley 15/50 was an updated version of the Wolseley 4/44 automobile. The main change was the engine; the 4/44 used a pre BMC Morris XPA unit and after the MG TF stopped production it was the only car still fitted with it. To rationalise production the 15/50 was launched with the BMC B-series engine fitted. Much of the design was shared with the MG Magnette, although some of the panels of the MG Magnette ZA/ZB (e.g. the boot and rear wings) are not interchangeable with those of the Wolseley 15/50, as stated in Practical Classics.

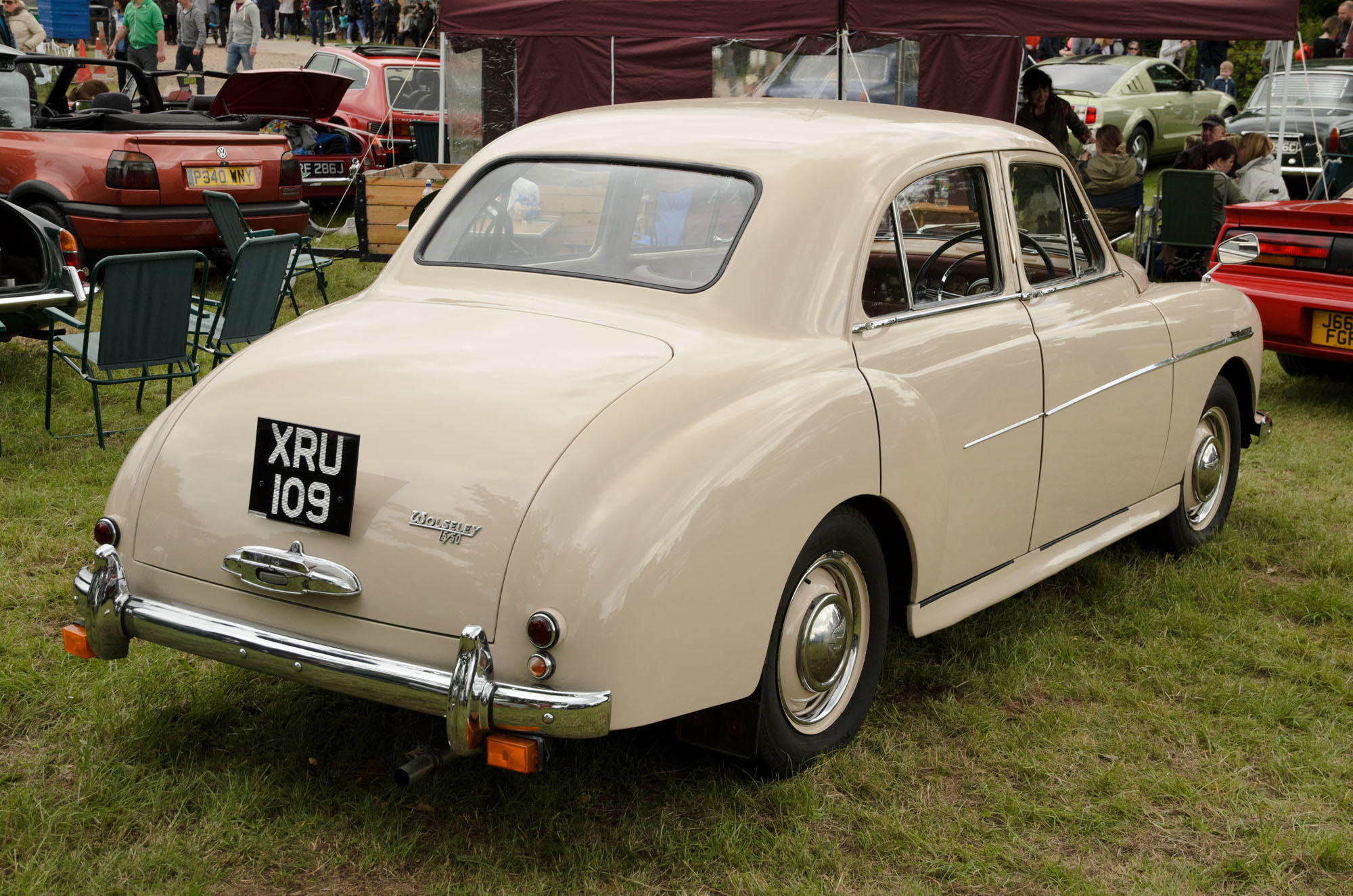
Rear view

Unlike the MG, the 15/50 engine had only a single SU carburettor so the power output was slightly less at 55 bhp (41 kW) at 4400 rpm. Unlike the 4/44, the 15/50 had a floor gear change. From 1956 a "Manumatic" two pedal (centrifugal clutch) transmission was an option. This was controlled by a micro switch hidden in the gear lever operating a vacuum servo. Having no synchromesh on bottom gear could make changes into the lowest ratio, which would normally require double declutching, difficult.

The construction was monocoque with independent suspension at the front by coil springs and a live rear axle with semi elliptic leaf springs. The steering was rack and pinion and Lockheed brakes were fitted with 9 in (230 mm) drums all round.

In keeping with the up-market positioning of the Wolseley brand the car had upmarket trim with polished walnut dashboard and door cappings and leather seats and a traditional Wolseley radiator grille with illuminated badge. The individual front seats were placed very closely together to allow the car to be used as a six-seater albeit marginal but it was usually sold as a four seater. The handbrake lever was under the dash. A heater was fitted as standard.

== Performance ==
An example with Manumatic transmission tested by the British The Motor magazine in 1957 had a top speed of 77.9 mph (125.4 km/h) and could accelerate from 0-60 mph (97 km/h) in 26.7 seconds. A fuel consumption of 28.7 miles per imperial gallon (9.8 L/100 km; 23.9 mpg_{‑US}) was recorded. The test car cost £1011 including taxes of £338.

It was replaced in 1958 by the Farina styled Wolseley 15/60.
