= Wolseley 4/44 =

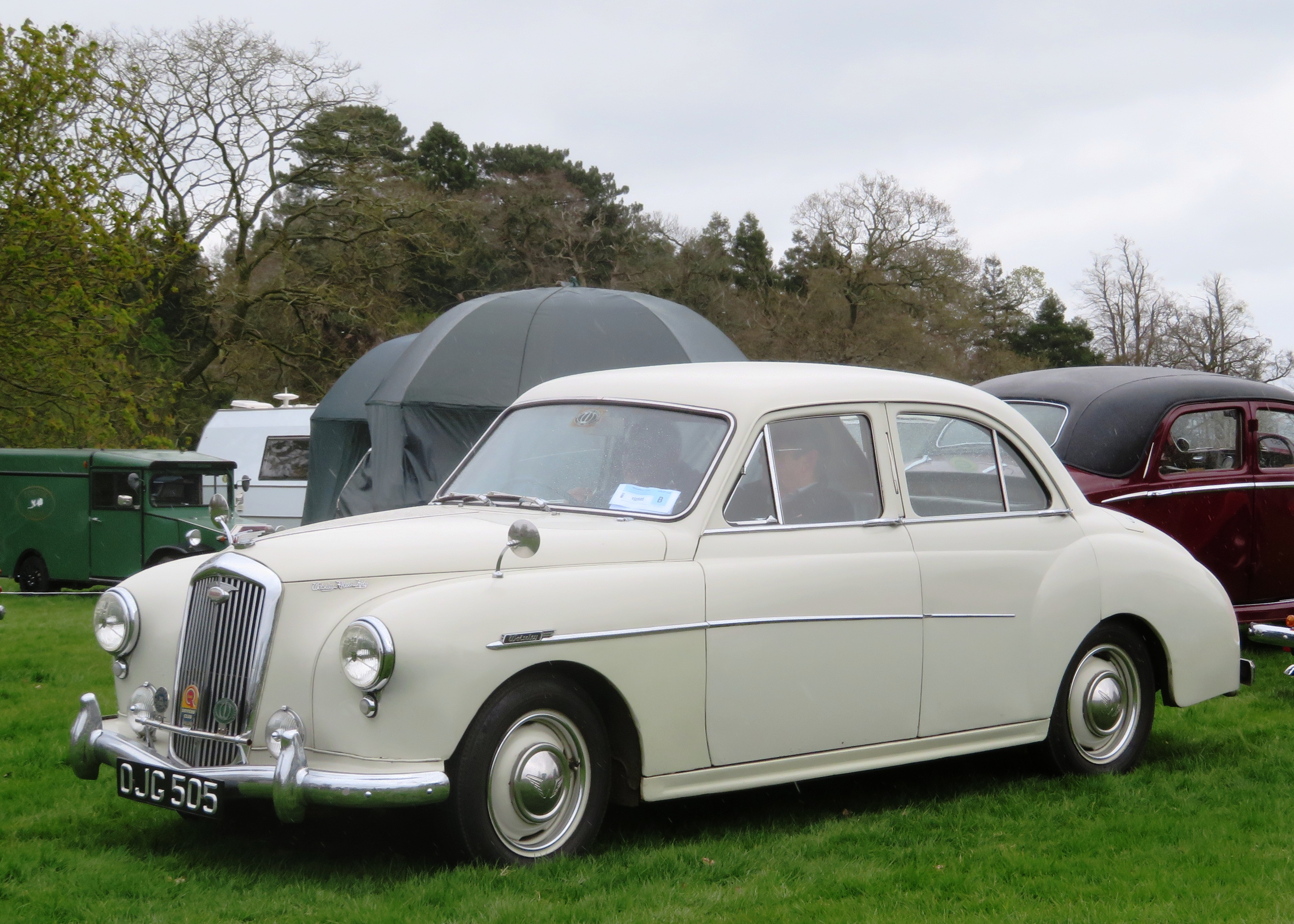

Overview
- Manufacturer: BMC
- Production: 1953–1956; 29,845 built
- Designer: Gerald Palmer

Body and chassis
- Body style: 4-door saloon

Powertrain
- Engine: Morris XPAW 1,250 cc (76 cu in) in-line 4

Dimensions
- Wheelbase: 102 in (2,591 mm)
- Length: 168 in (4,267 mm)
- Width: 61 in (1,549 mm)

Chronology
- Predecessor: Wolseley 4/50
- Successor: Wolseley 15/50

The Wolseley 4/44 is an automobile that was introduced by the British Motor Corporation in 1952 and manufactured from 1953 until 1956. It was designed under the Nuffield Organization, but by the time it was released, Wolseley was part of BMC. Much of the design was shared with the MG Magnette ZA, which was released later in the same year.

Unlike the MG, the 4/44 used the 1,250 cc (76 cu in) XPAW engine, a version of the XPAG engine previously seen in the later MG T-type series of cars but detuned by only having a single carburettor. The power output was 46 bhp (34 kW) at 4800 rpm. The four-speed manual transmission had a column change.

The construction was monocoque, with independent suspension at the front by coil springs and a live rear axle.

The car had upmarket trim, with wooden dashboard and leather seats and a traditional Wolseley radiator grille with illuminated badge, but was expensive at £997 on the home market.

An example tested by The Motor magazine had a top speed of 73 mph (117 km/h) and could accelerate from 0–60 mph (97 km/h) in 29.9 seconds. A fuel consumption of 27.6 miles per imperial gallon (10.2 L/100 km; 23.0 mpg_{‑US}) was recorded.

The 4/44 was replaced in 1956 by the similar Wolseley 15/50.

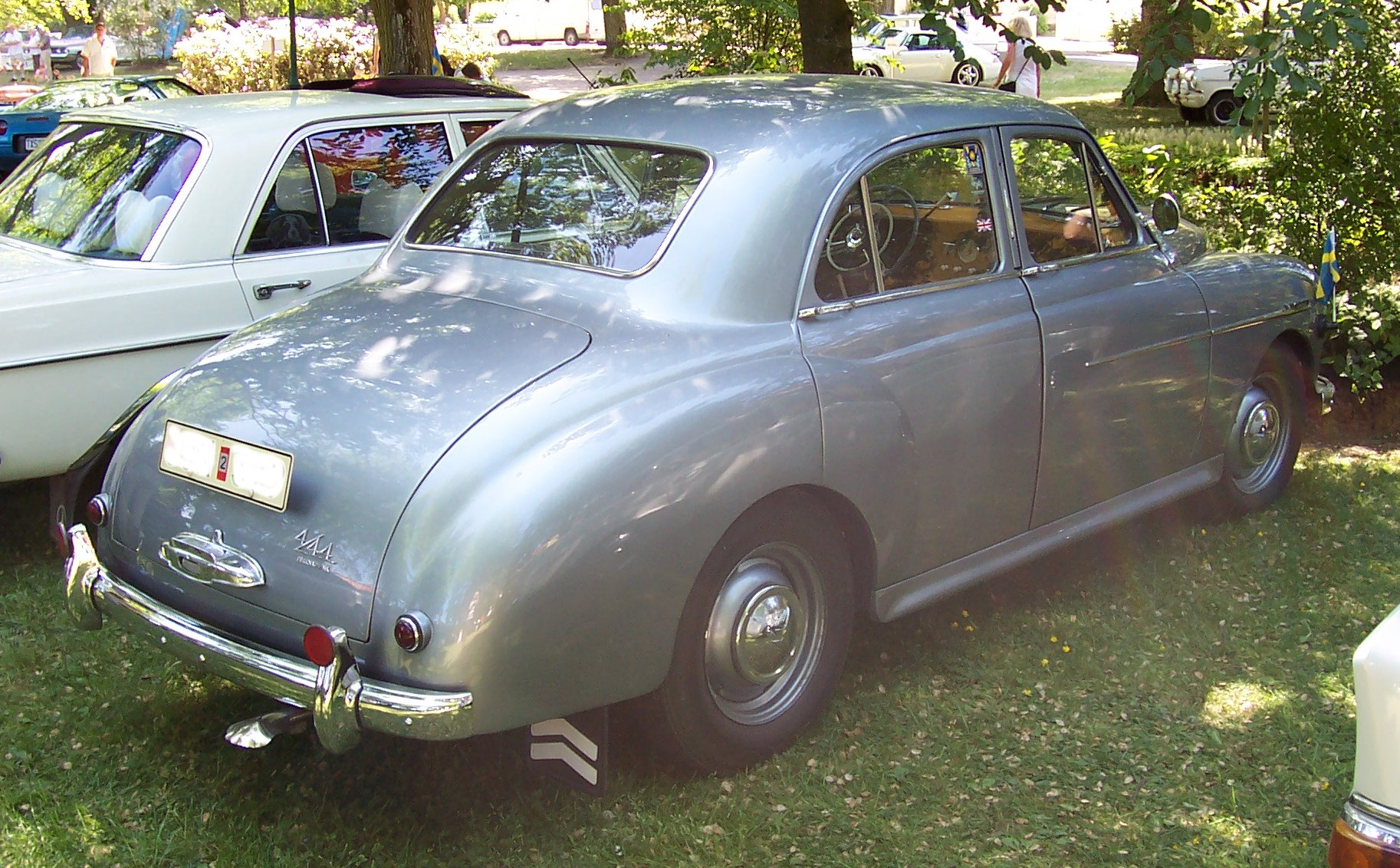

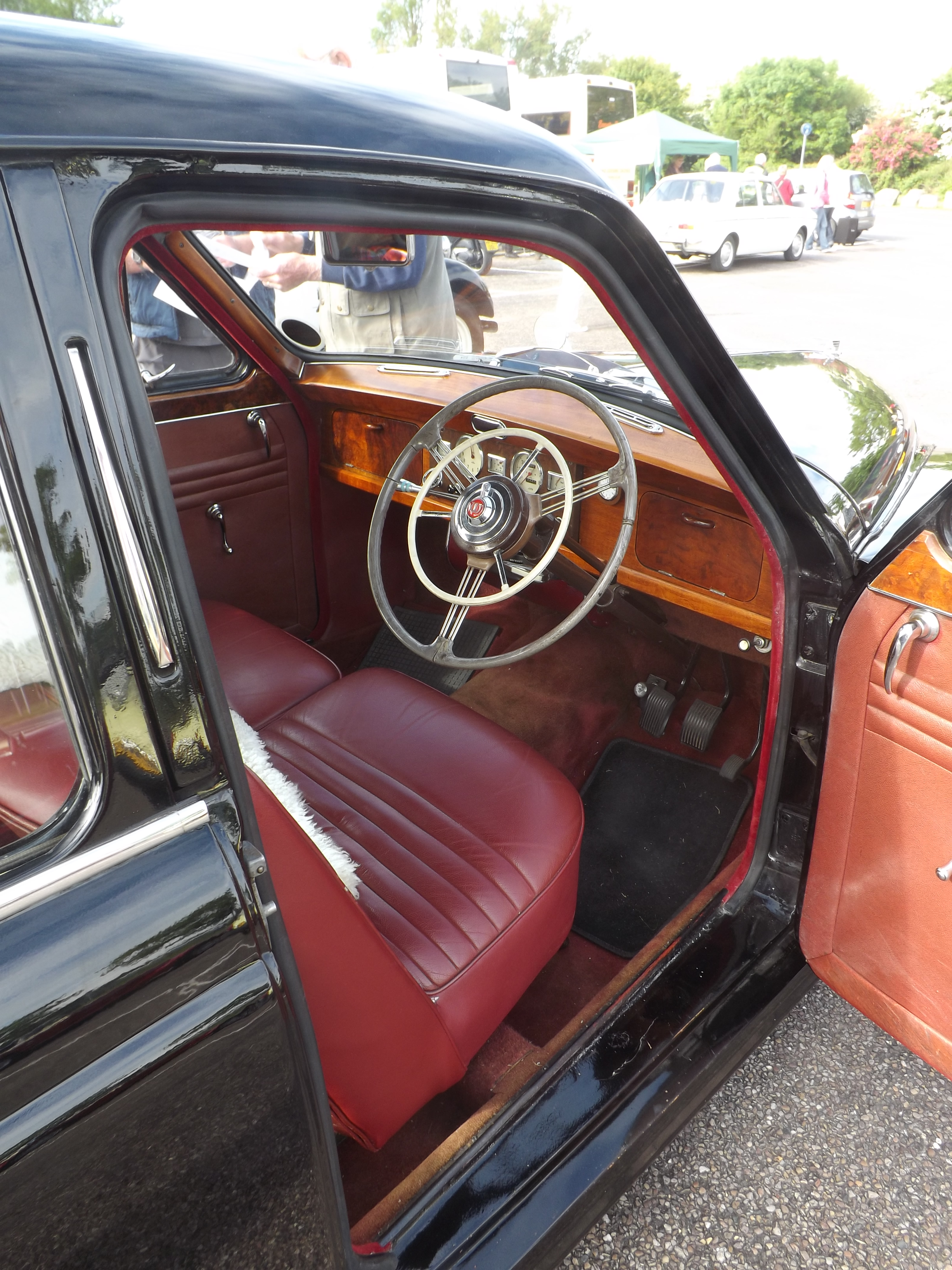
