= Austin Cambridge =

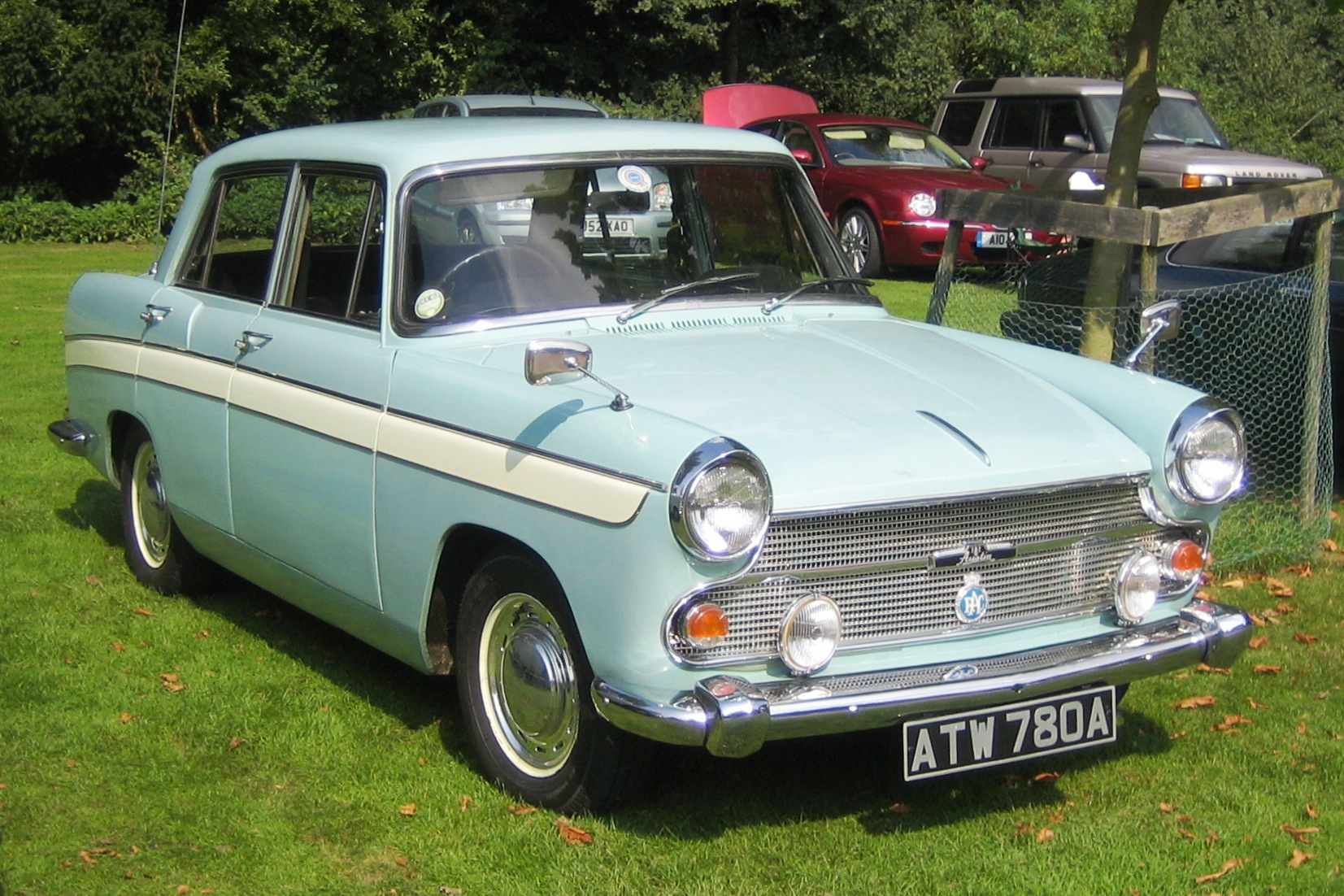
- 1963 Austin A60 Cambridge

Overview
- Manufacturer: Austin Motor Company
- Production: 1954–1973
- Assembly: United Kingdom: Cowley, Oxford, England

Body and chassis
- Class: Small family car (1954–1958); Large family car (1959–1969)
- Body style: 4-door estate 4-door saloon 2-door van 2-door coupé utility (pickup)
- Layout: FR layout

Chronology
- Predecessor: Austin A40 Somerset
- Successor: Austin Maxi; Nissan Cedric (Japan)

See Austin 10 for the Cambridge models of 1937 to 1947.
See Austin A40 for other A40 models.

The Austin Cambridge (sold as A40, A50, A55, and A60) is a medium-sized motor car range produced by the Austin Motor Company, in several generations, from September 1954 through to 1971 as cars and to 1973 as light commercials. It replaced the A40 Somerset and was entirely new, with modern unibody construction. The range had two basic body styles with the A40, A50, and early A55 using a traditional rounded shape and later A55 Mark IIs and A60s using Pininfarina styling.

The A40 number was re-used on a smaller car (the Austin A40 Farina) from 1958 to 1968, and the Cambridge name had previously been used to designate one of the available body styles on the pre-war 10 hp range.

The Austin Cambridge was initially offered only with a four-passenger, four-door saloon body, although a few pre-production two-door models were also made. It had a modern body design with integrated wings and a full-width grille. Independent suspension was provided at the front by coil springs and wishbones while a live axle with anti-roll bar was retained at the rear.

A van derivative introduced in November 1956 and a coupé utility (pick up) introduced in May 1957 and remained available until 1974, some three years after the demise of the cars on which they had been based.

== A40 Cambridge ==
A40
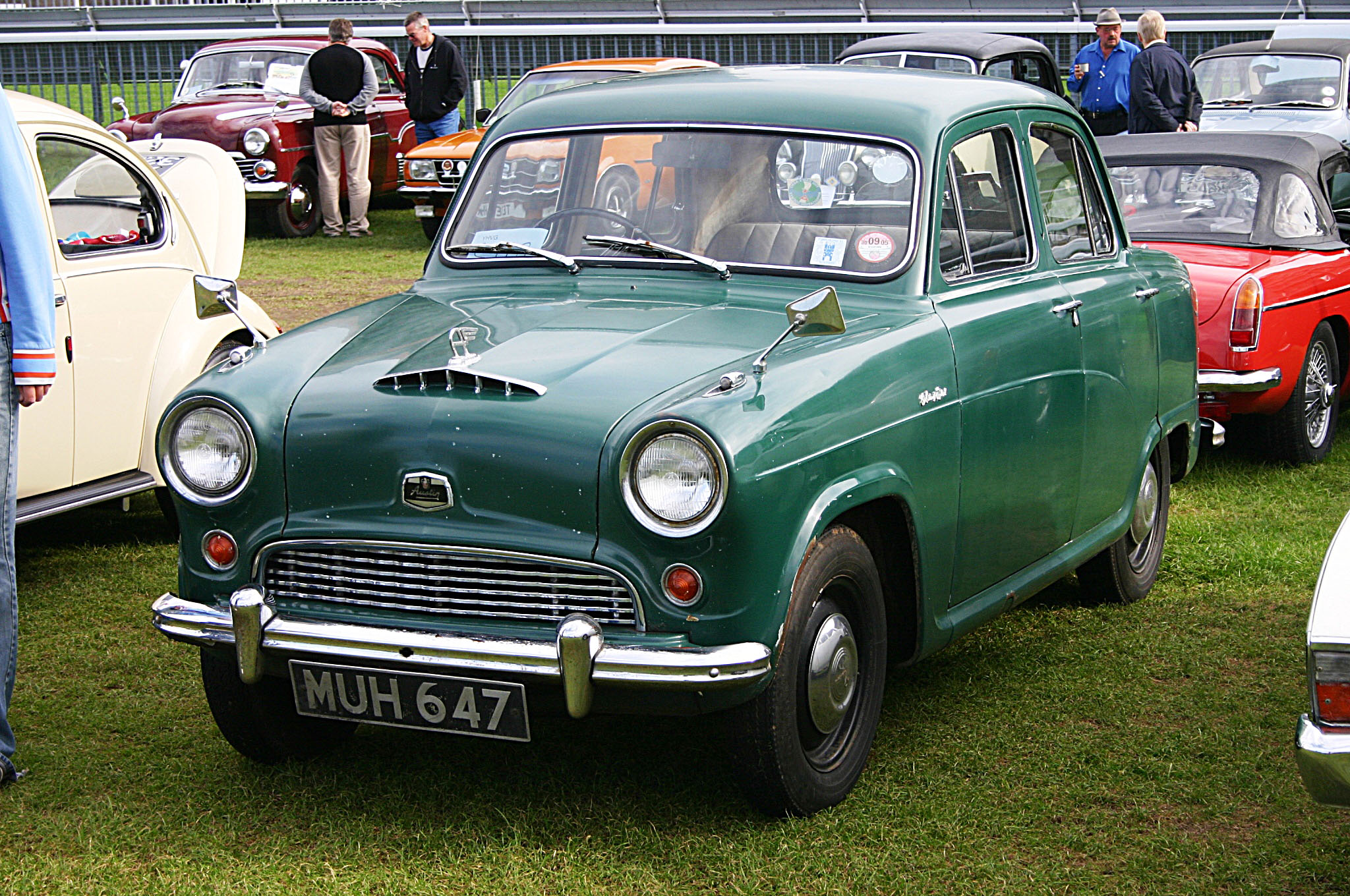
- Austin A40 Cambridge

Overview
- Production: 1954–1956

Body and chassis
- Body style: 4-door saloon

Powertrain
- Engine: 1.2 L Straight-4; 42 bhp

Dimensions
- Wheelbase: 99.25 in (2,521 mm)
- Length: 162.25 in (4,121 mm)
- Width: 61.5 in (1,562 mm)
- Kerb weight: 2,352 lb (1,067 kg)

A 1.2-litre straight-four pushrod engine B-Series engine based on the one used in the previous Austin Somerset (although sharing no parts) powered the new Austin Cambridge. A maximum power output of 42 bhp (31 kW) was claimed: power was transmitted to the wheels by means of a four-speed gearbox controlled with a column-mounted lever.

The A40 Cambridge was intended to be available in both two-door saloon and four-door saloon variants; however, the two-door body style did not reach production.

Only 30,666 A40 Cambridge models were produced. After the A40 Cambridge was dropped early in 1957, the A40 name was re-used on the smaller A40 Farina, though that car, the 'Countryman' version of which was an early example of a hatchback, was neither a replacement nor much related to the A40 Cambridge.

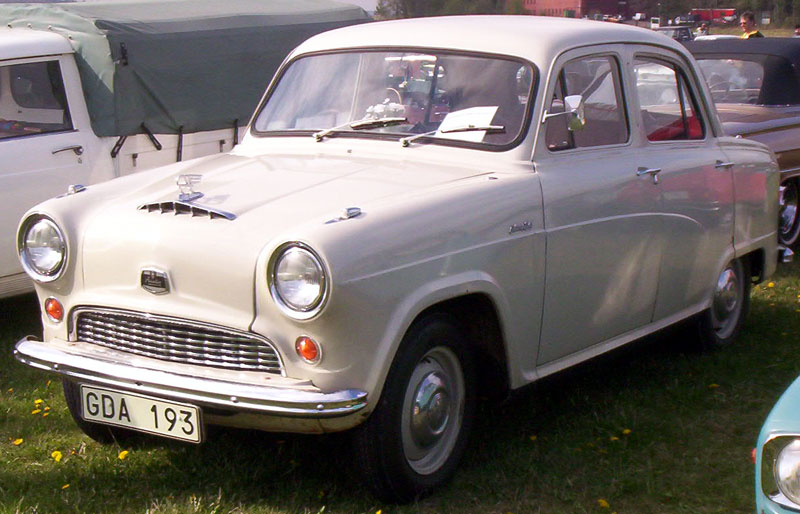
Austin A40 Cambridge of 1956

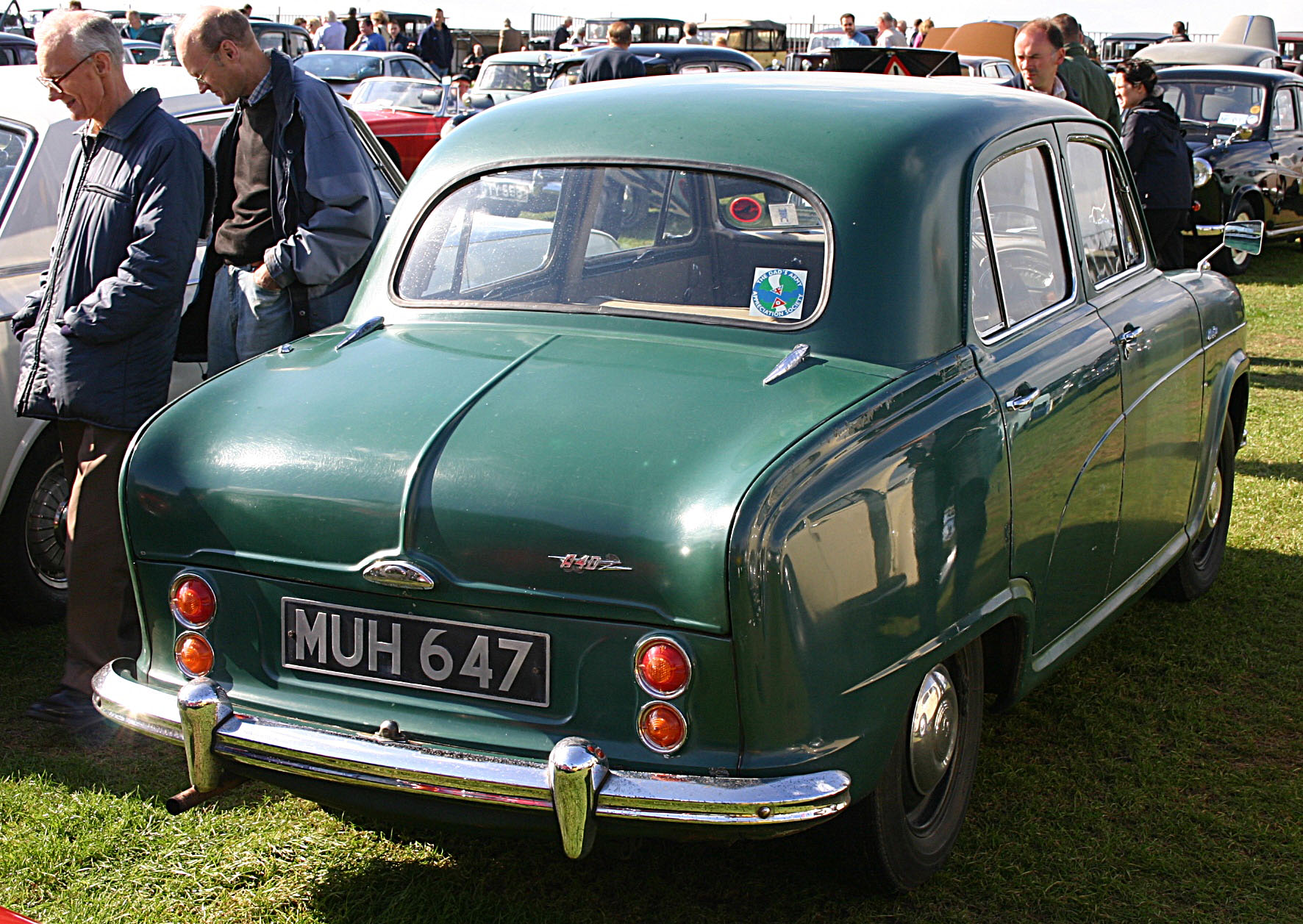
Austin A40 Cambridge, rear view

== A50 Cambridge ==
A50
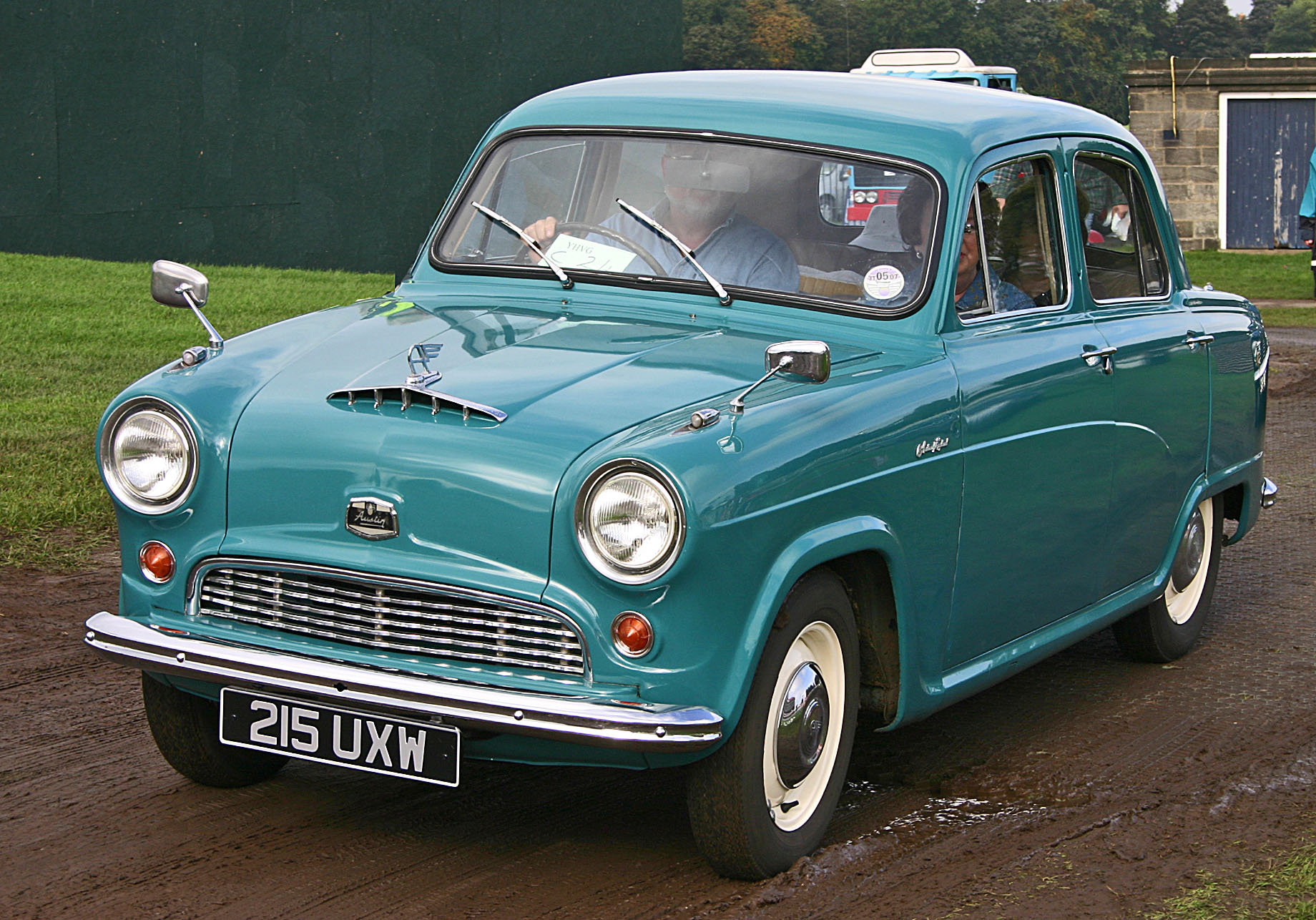

Overview
- Also called: Nissan-Austin A50 Cambridge (Japan)
- Production: 1954–1957; 1954–1959 (Japan)
- Assembly: United Kingdom: Cowley, Oxford, England; Australia: Victoria Park; Japan: Yokohama (Nissan)

Body and chassis
- Body style: 4-door saloon 5-door estate (Japan); 2-door coupé utility (Australia)

Powertrain
- Engine: 1.5 L B-Series straight-4 50 bhp

Dimensions
- Wheelbase: 99.25 in (2,521 mm)49 in (1,245 mm)
- Length: 162.25 in (4,121 mm)
- Width: 61.5 in (1,562 mm)
- Height: 61.5 in (1,562 mm)
- Kerb weight: 2,352 lb (1,067 kg)

Also introduced in September 1954, and with a body identical to that of the A40 Cambridge, was the A50 Cambridge which used a new 1.5-litre (1,489 cc) B-Series four-cylinder engine with single Zenith carburettor which was good for 50 hp (37 kW). It sold better and remained in production through to 1957 with 114,867 A50s being produced

The deluxe version had a heater, leather seat facings, carpets replacing the standard rubber matting, armrests on the doors, twin-tone horns, a passenger sun visor, and some extra chrome, including overriders.

Technical advances in the A50 Cambridge included an optional Borg-Warner overdrive unit for the top three (of four) gears. A semi-automatic transmission (branded "manumatic" and providing pedal-free clutch operation) was also offered, but it was unpopular with buyers.

A number of modifications were introduced in October 1956, including smaller 13 in (330 mm) wheels and an increased compression ratio (8.3:1).

A deluxe version tested by The Motor magazine in 1955, had a top speed of 73.6 mph (118.4 km/h) and could accelerate from 0–60 mph (97 km/h) in 28.8 seconds. A fuel consumption of 28.0 miles per imperial gallon (10.1 L/100 km; 23.3 mpg_{‑US}) was recorded. The test car cost £720 including taxes.

A radio and a clock were optional extras.

As with its predecessor A40 Somerset, the A50 Cambridge was built under licence by Nissan in Japan; the arrangement ended in 1959. In total, 20,855 licensed Austin vehicles were produced by Nissan in Japan between 1953 and 1959.

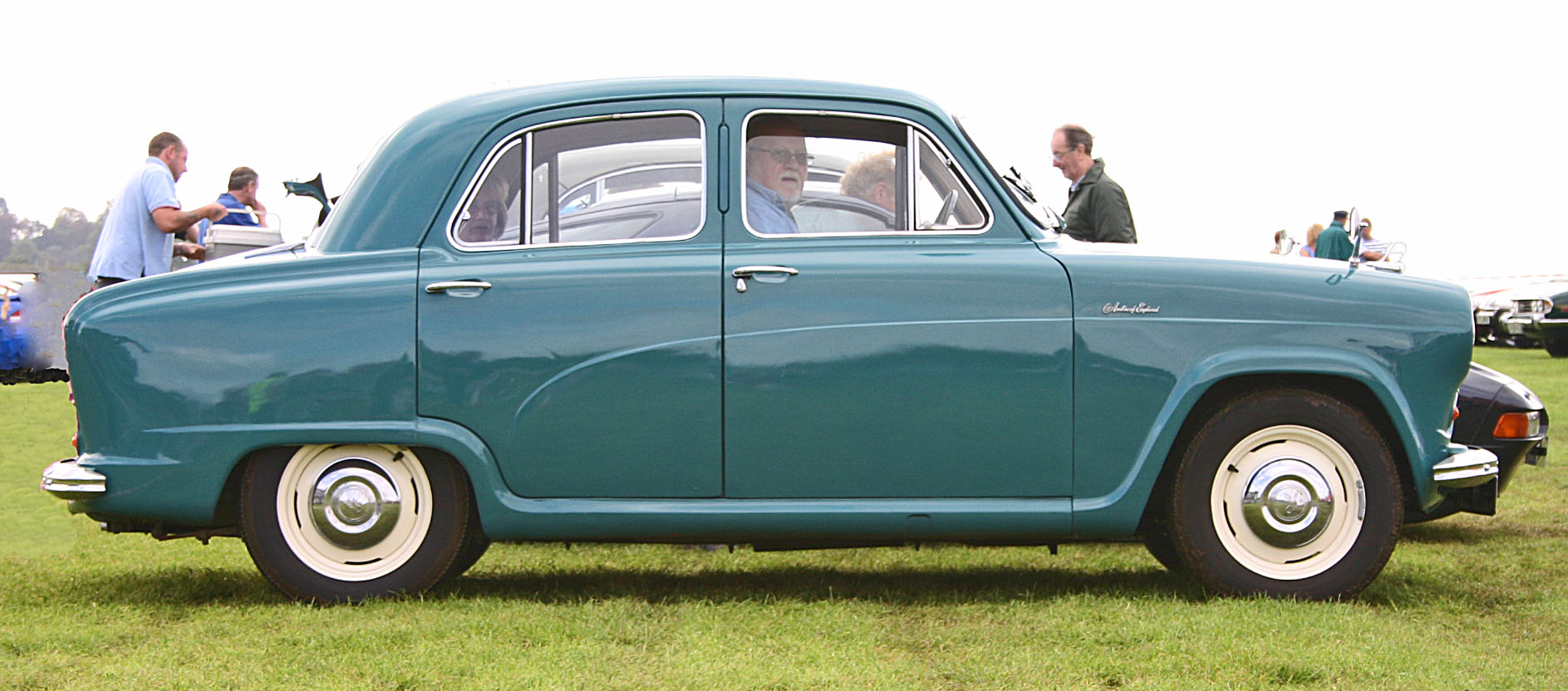
Austin A50 Cambridge, side view

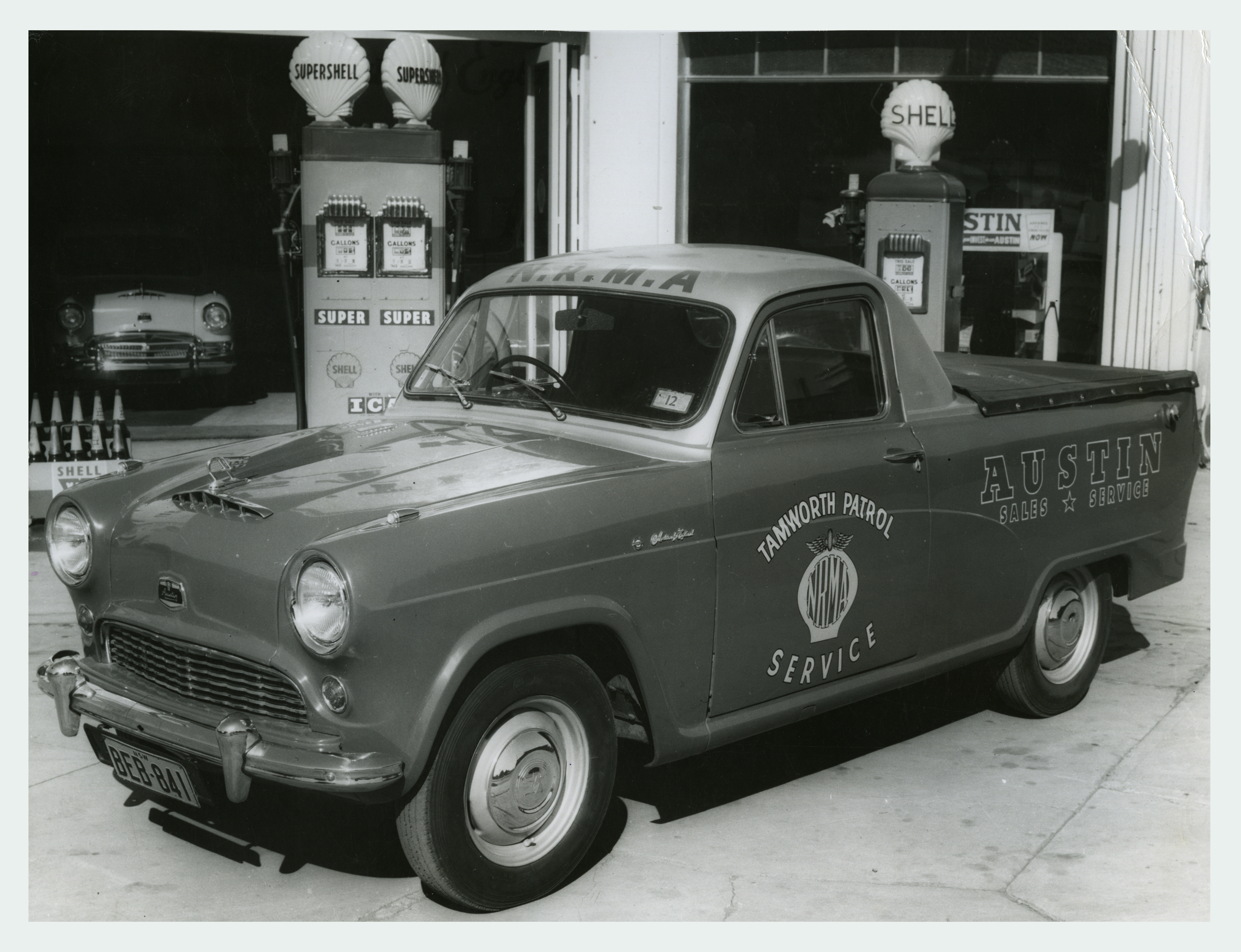
Austin A50 coupe utility (Australia)

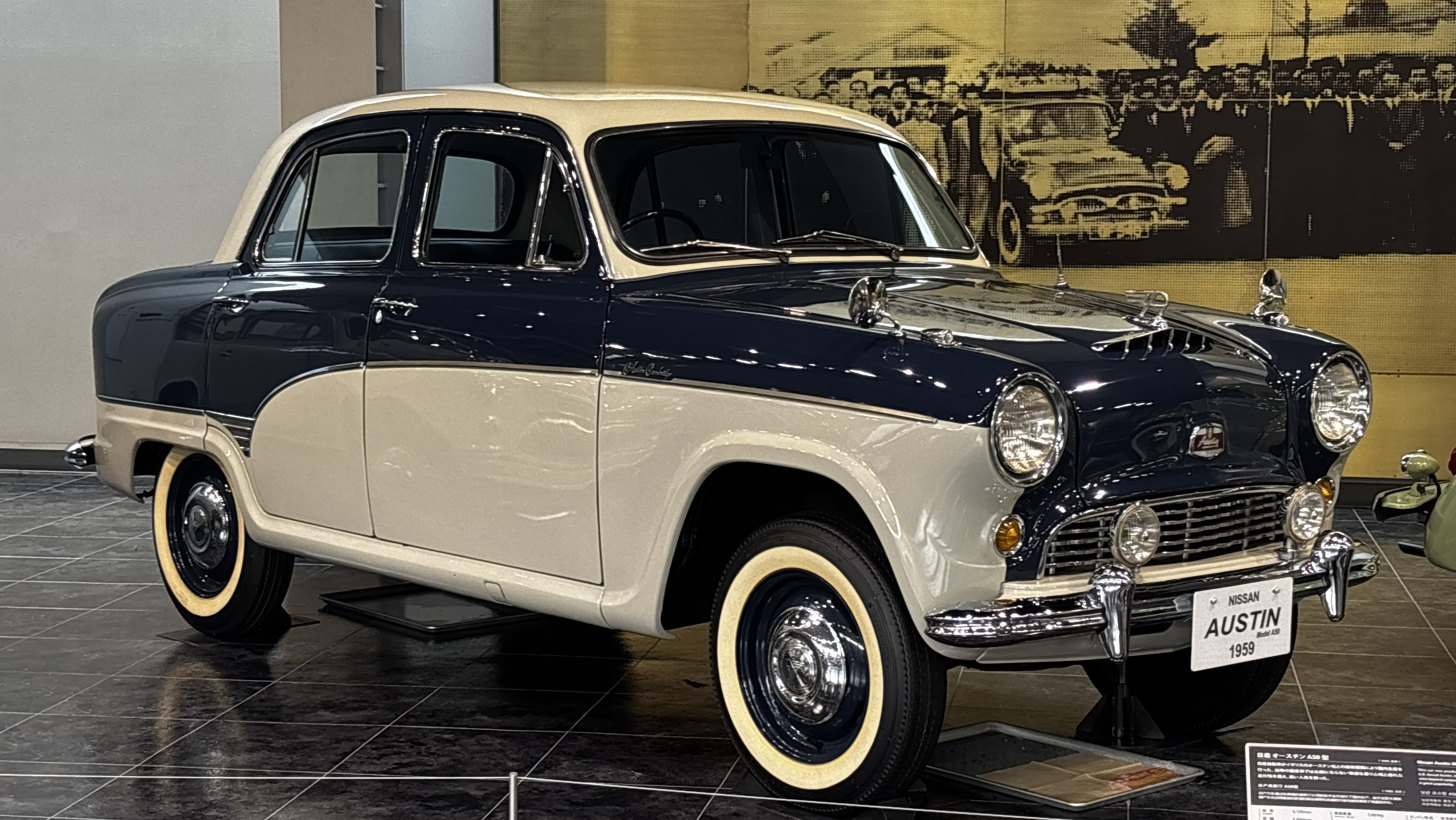
Nissan Austin A50 Cambridge (Japan)

== A55 Cambridge ==
A55
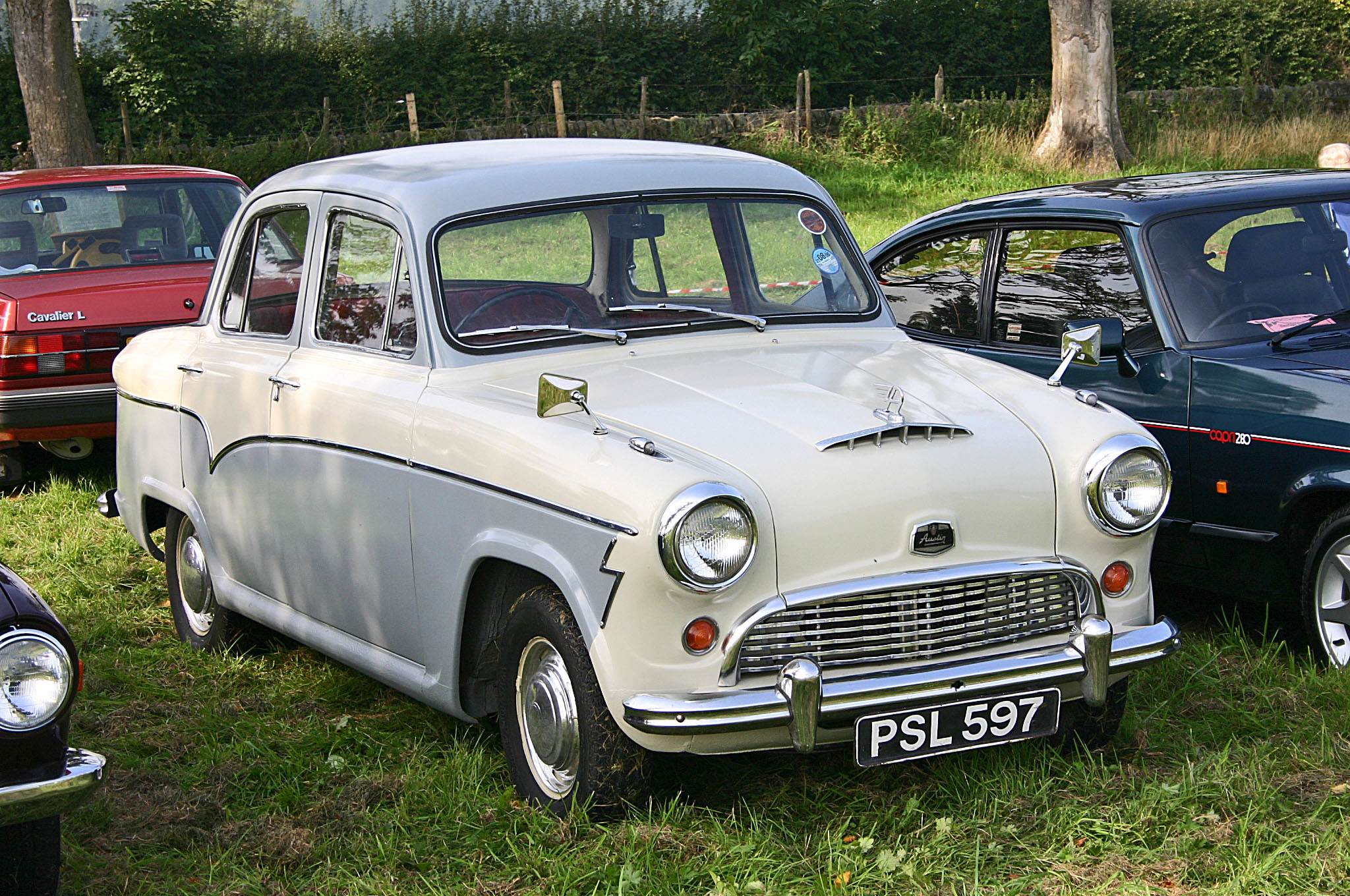
- Austin A55 Cambridge

Overview
- Also called: Austin Cambrian (North America); Austin ½ Ton; Morris ½ Ton
- Production: 1957–1958 (until 1973 for ½ ton)
- Assembly: United Kingdom: Cowley, Oxford, England; Australia: Victoria Park

Body and chassis
- Body style: 4-door saloon 2-door van 2-door pickup 2-door coupe utility (Australia)

Powertrain
- Engine: 1.5 L B-Series straight-4 51 bhp

Dimensions
- Wheelbase: 99.25 in (2,521 mm)49 in (1,245 mm)
- Length: 167 in (4,242 mm)
- Width: 61.5 in (1,562 mm)
- Height: 60 in (1,524 mm)
- Kerb weight: 2,352 lb (1,067 kg)

In January 1957, the A55 Cambridge was introduced to replace the A50 model. It used the same 1.5-litre B-Series engine as its predecessor, though with a higher compression ratio. It was rated at 51 hp (38 kW) at 4,250 rpm.

The Cambridge had been restyled somewhat and now had a larger boot and much larger rear window. The car was also lowered by fitting 13 in (330 mm) road wheels which were smaller than those on the A50 but the overall gearing remained the same by changing the rear axle ratio. Two-tone paint was an option.

Some 154,000 were produced before it was replaced by a new Pininfarina-designed A55 Cambridge for 1959.

A deluxe A55 with manumatic transmission which was tested by The Motor magazine in 1957 had a top speed of 77.1 mph (124.1 km/h) and could accelerate from 0-60 mph (97 km/h) in 27.0 seconds. A fuel consumption of 31.6 miles per imperial gallon (8.9 L/100 km; 26.3 mpg_{‑US}) was recorded. The test car cost £870 including taxes of £291.

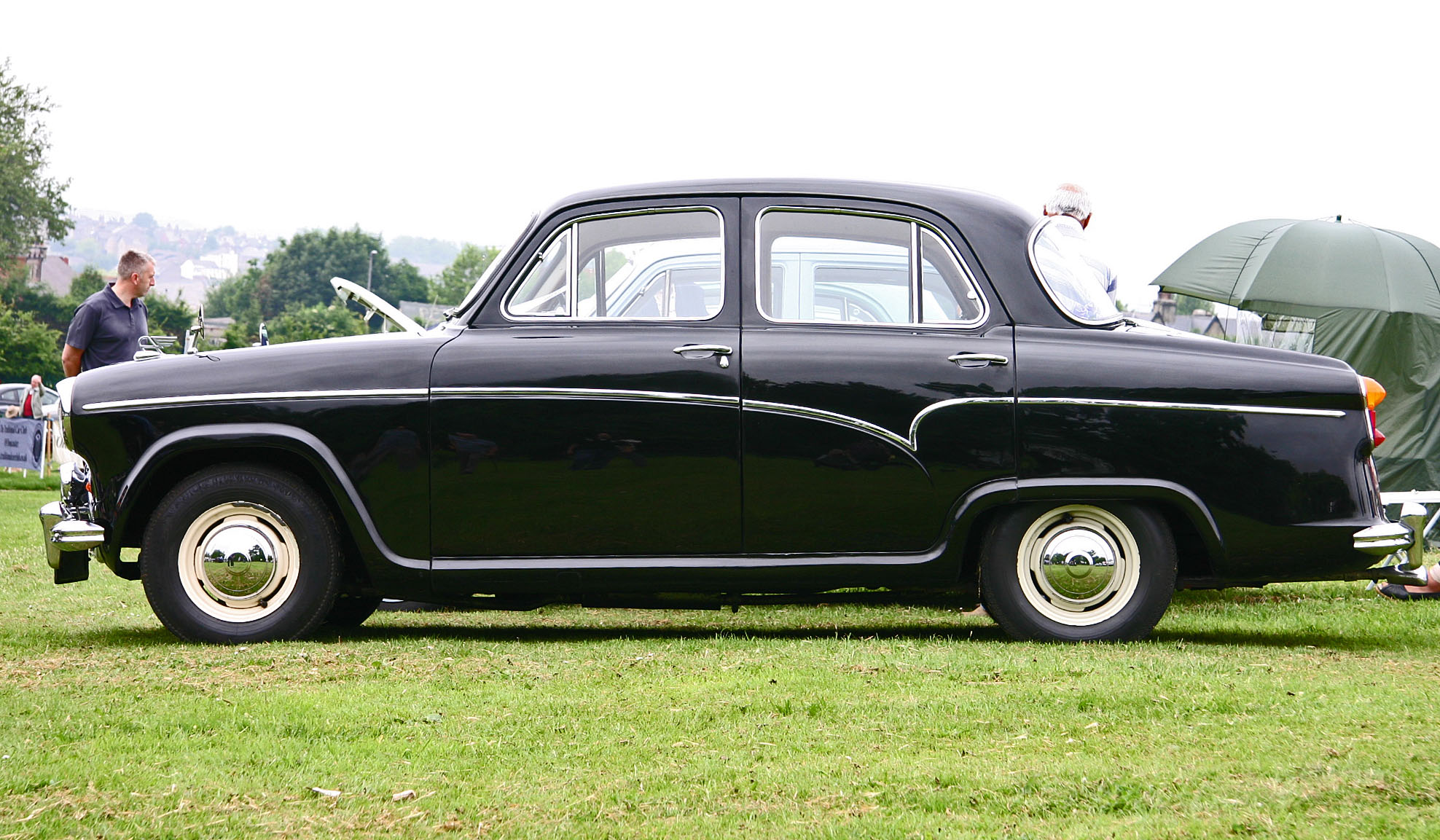
Austin A55 Cambridge in profile

=== Half-ton commercials ===
Half-ton commercial models based on the A55 were introduced in 1957. The van was released in February and was followed in May by pick-up, chassis and cab and chassis and scuttle models. Contemporary sales literature used the term "Austin ½ ton van and pick-up".

In October 1962, new models were introduced with a restyled front end and bumper, chrome side mouldings, 14" wheels, and various interior refinements. Morris-badged van and pick-up models also were now offered. From September 1963, the commercial models were fitted with the 1,622 cc (99.0 cu in) engine from the Austin A60 saloon, with the Austins still marketed under the "Austin ½ ton" name. They remained in production to 1973.

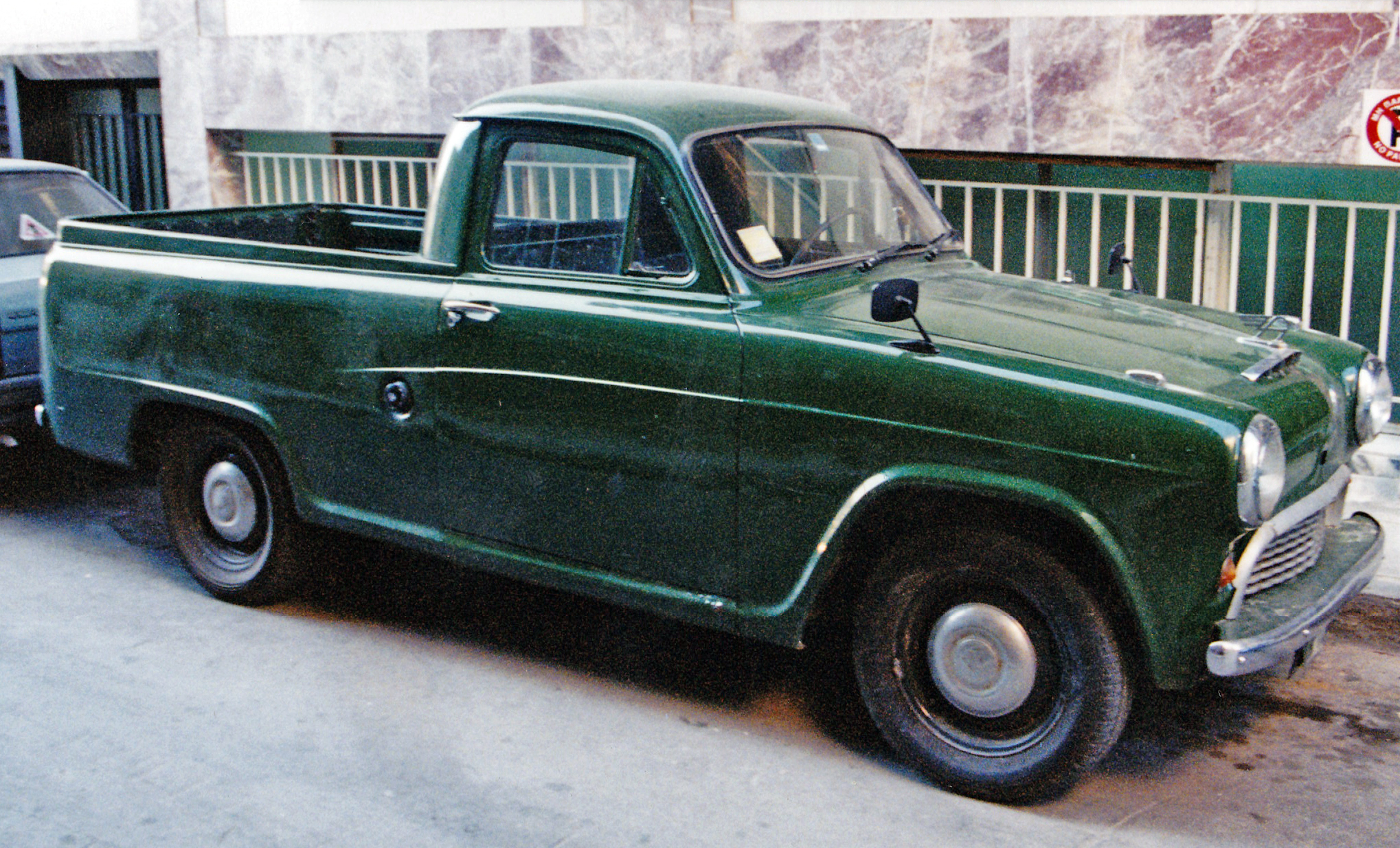
Austin 1/2 ton pick-up (pre-facelift)

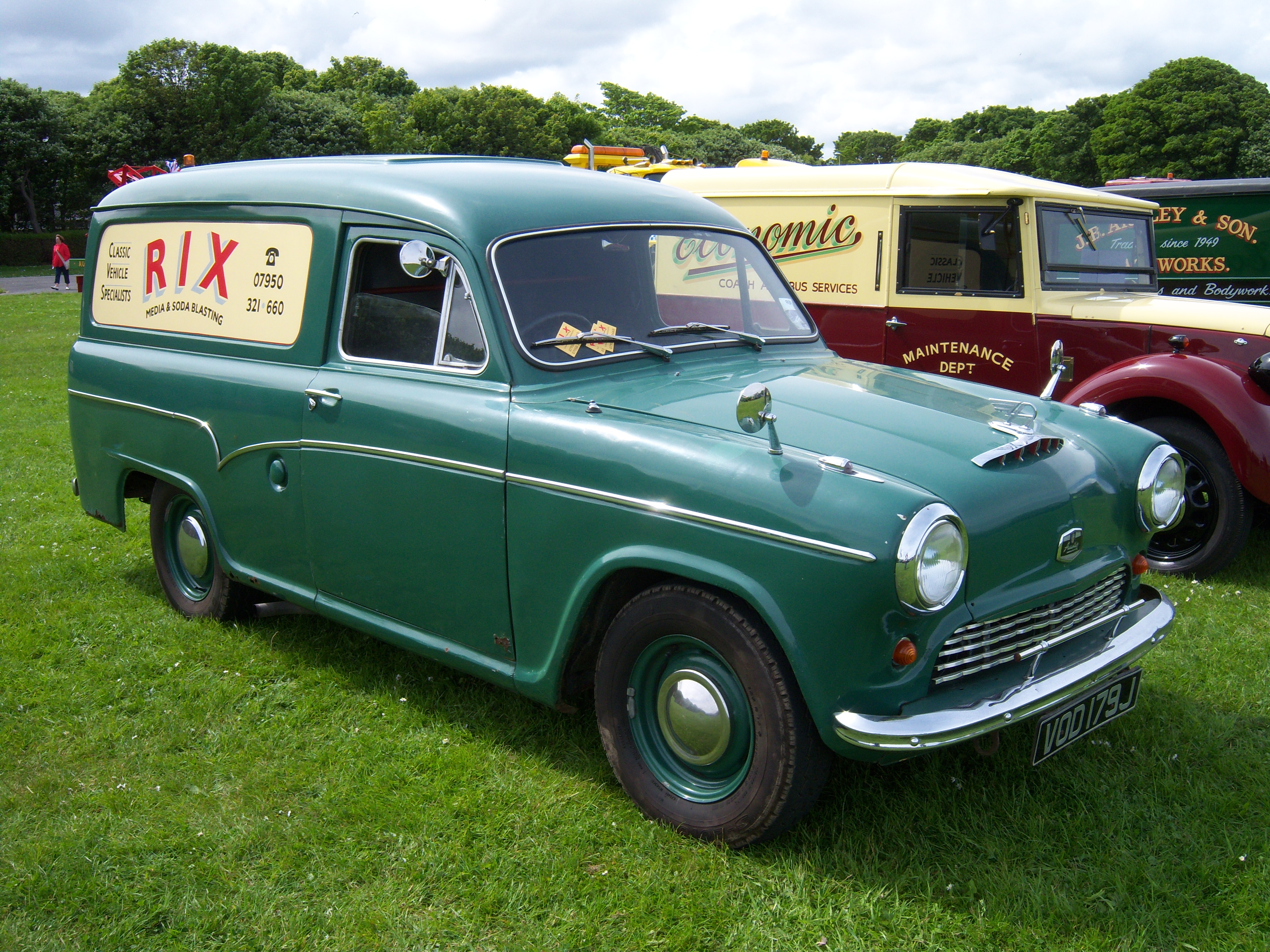
Austin 1/2 ton van (pre-facelift)

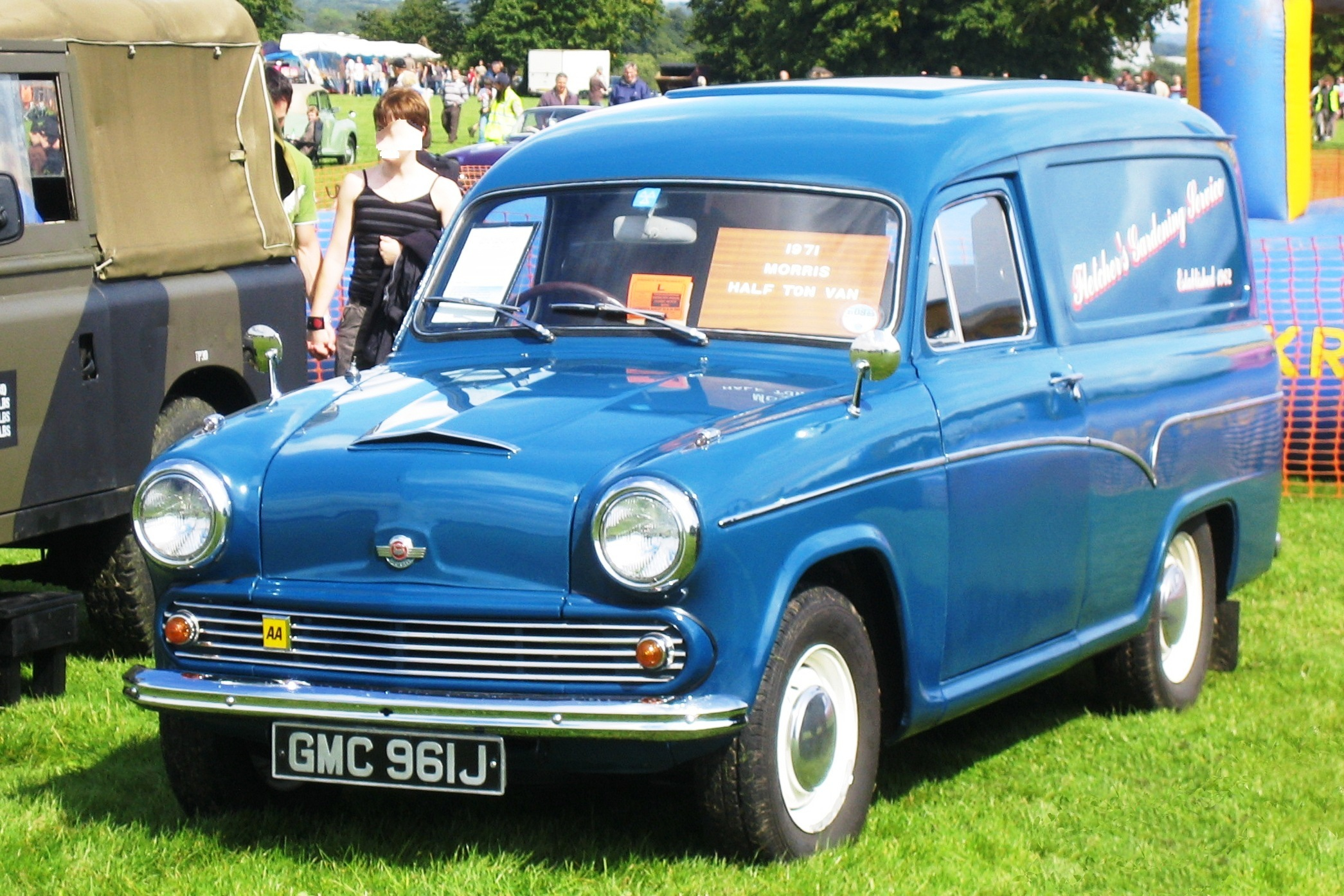
Morris 1/2 ton van

=== Australian production ===
The A55 Cambridge saloon was assembled by BMC Australia and a coupe utility version was designed and assembled by the Sydney-based Pressed Metal Corporation, a subsidiary of Larke, Neave and Carter, Austin Distributors.

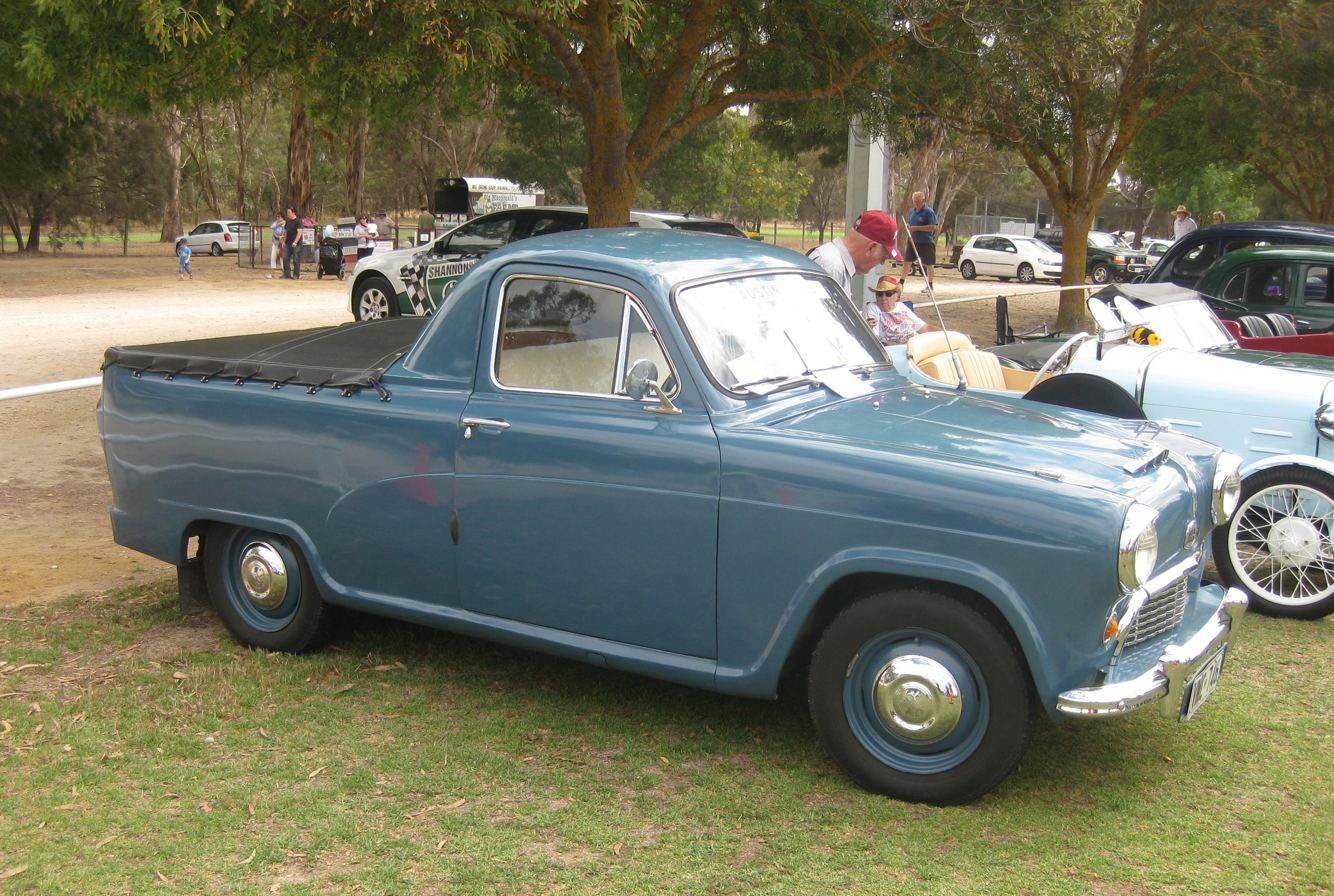
Austin A55 coupe utility

== A55 Cambridge Mark II ==
A55 Mark II
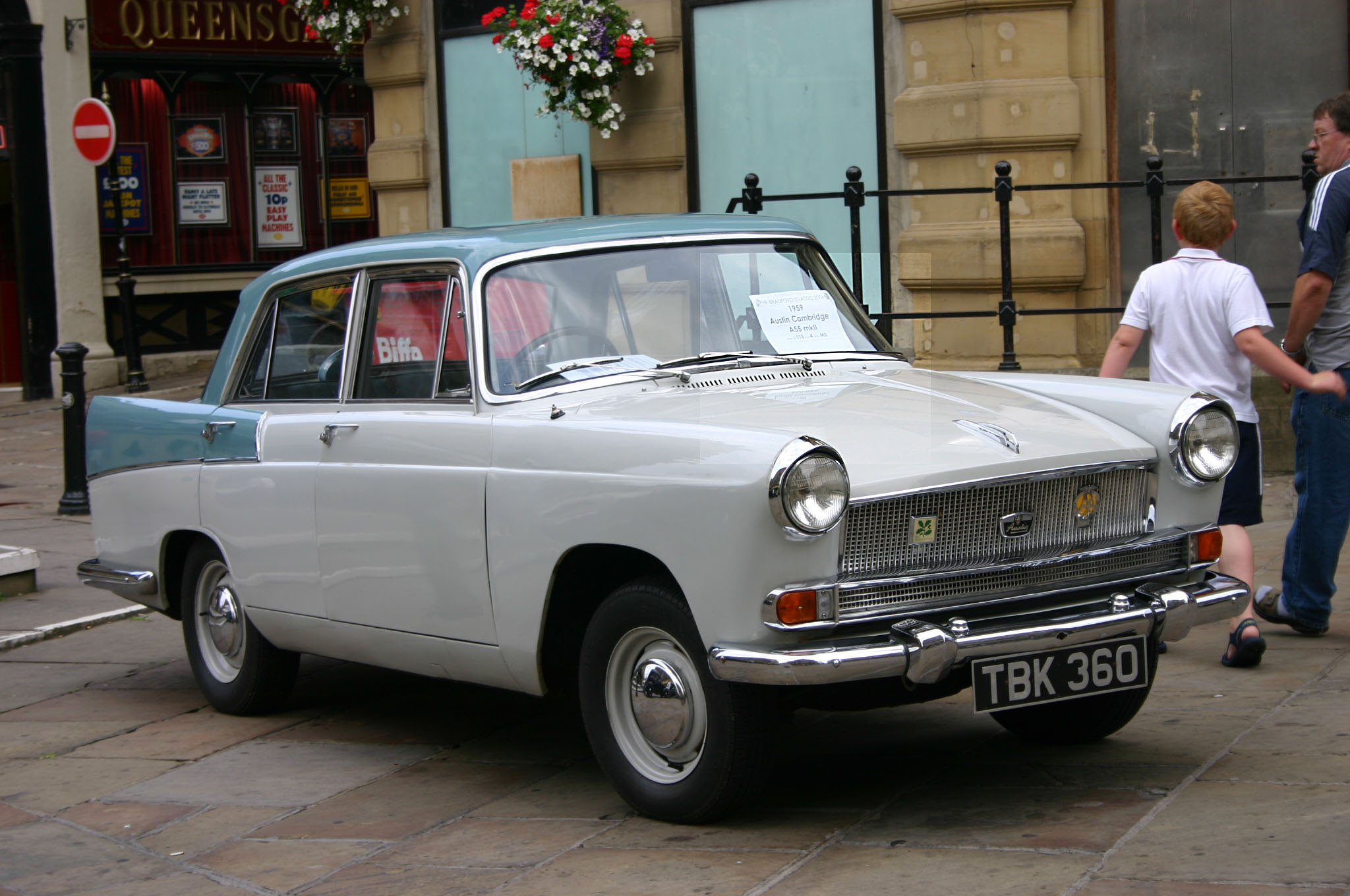
- Austin A55 Cambridge Mark II saloon

Overview
- Also called: Austin A60 (Australia); Austin Cambrian (North America)
- Production: 1959–1961
- Designer: Pinin Farina

Body and chassis
- Related: Morris Oxford; Riley 4/68; MG Magnette III; Wolseley 15/60; Siam di Tella

Powertrain
- Engine: 1.5 L B-Series straight-4 55 bhp 1.6 L B-Series straight-4 (Australia)

Dimensions
- Wheelbase: 99.25 in (2,521 mm)
- Length: 178.5 in (4,534 mm)
- Width: 63.5 in (1,613 mm)
- Height: 59.75 in (1,518 mm)
- Kerb weight: 2,464 lb (1,118 kg)

The A55 Cambridge Mark II, known as the first "Farina" model because of its Pinin Farina design, was produced from 1959 through to 1961. It was also badge engineered as a Morris Oxford and retained the 1.5 litre B-Series engine, now with an SU carburettor, and producing 55 bhp (41 kW) at 4,350 rpm.

The interior had individual leather trimmed seats in front spaced closely together to allow a central passenger to be carried. The gear change was either on the column or floor-mounted and the handbrake lever between the driver's seat and the door. Other improvements highlighted at the time included an enlarged luggage compartment with counterbalanced lid and increased elbow width on both front and rear seats. A heater could be fitted as an option.

A "Countryman" estate model appeared in 1960. The Austin Cambridge estates was called the "Countryman". (Morris Oxford Estates were called "Travellers".) A55 Mark II and A60 estates were identical from the windscreen back; the later models never got the reduced rear fins and modified rear lights of the A60 saloons.

The engineering of the car was conventional with coil sprung independent front suspension and a live axle at the rear with semi elliptic leaf springs. The braking used a Girling system with 9 in (229 mm) drums all round.

A total of 149,994 were built.

A MkII A55 was tested by The Motor magazine in 1959 had a top speed of 75.5 mph (121.5 km/h) and could accelerate from 0–60 mph (97 km/h) in 24.5 seconds. A fuel consumption of 31.0 miles per imperial gallon (9.1 L/100 km; 25.8 mpg_{‑US}) was recorded. The test car cost £878 including taxes of £293.

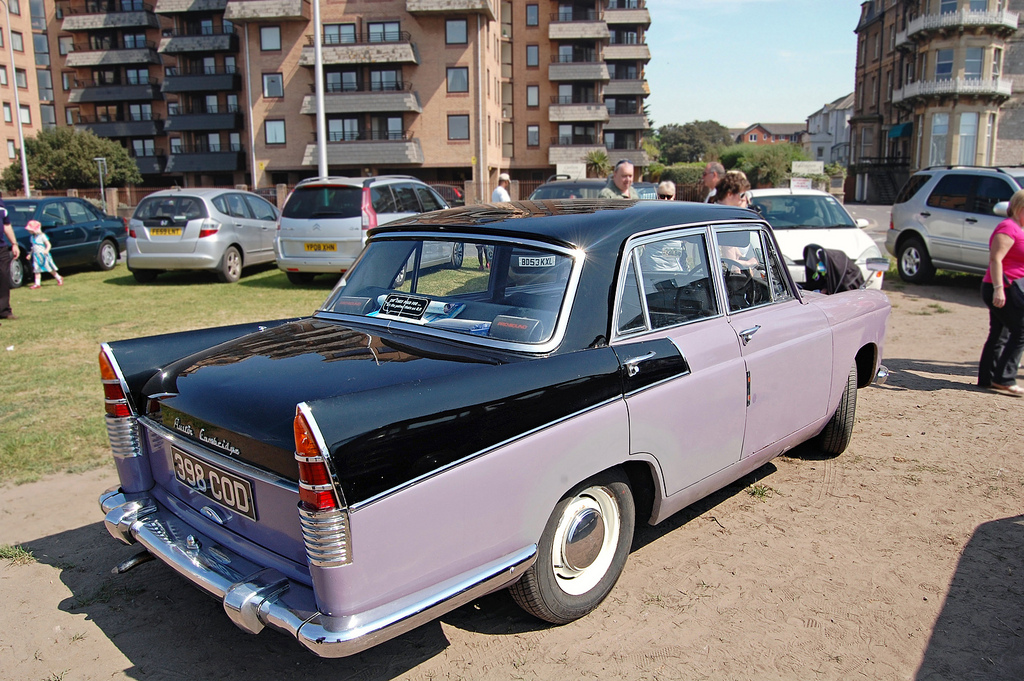
Austin A55 Cambridge Mark II saloon

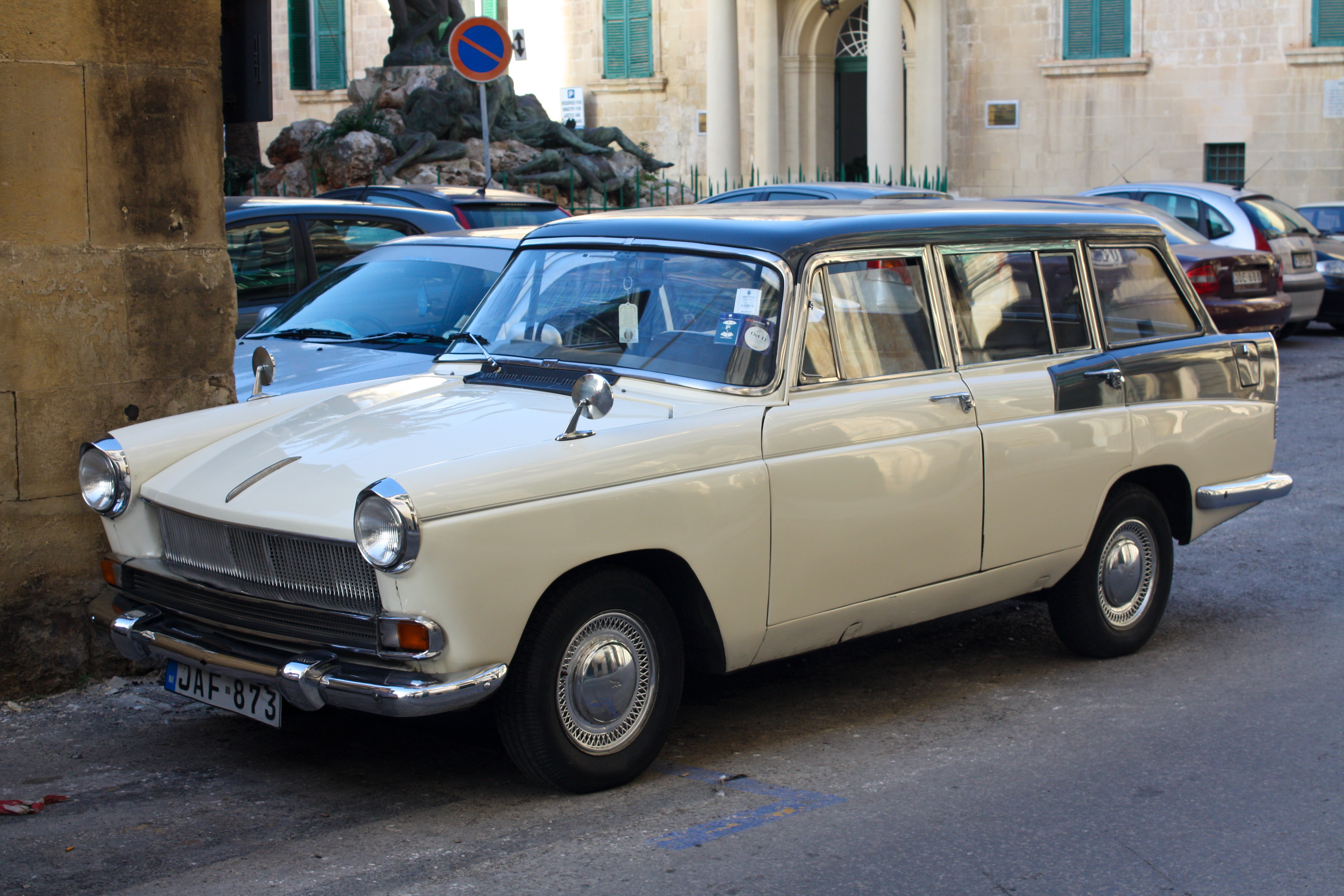
Austin A55 Cambridge Mark II estate

=== Australian production ===
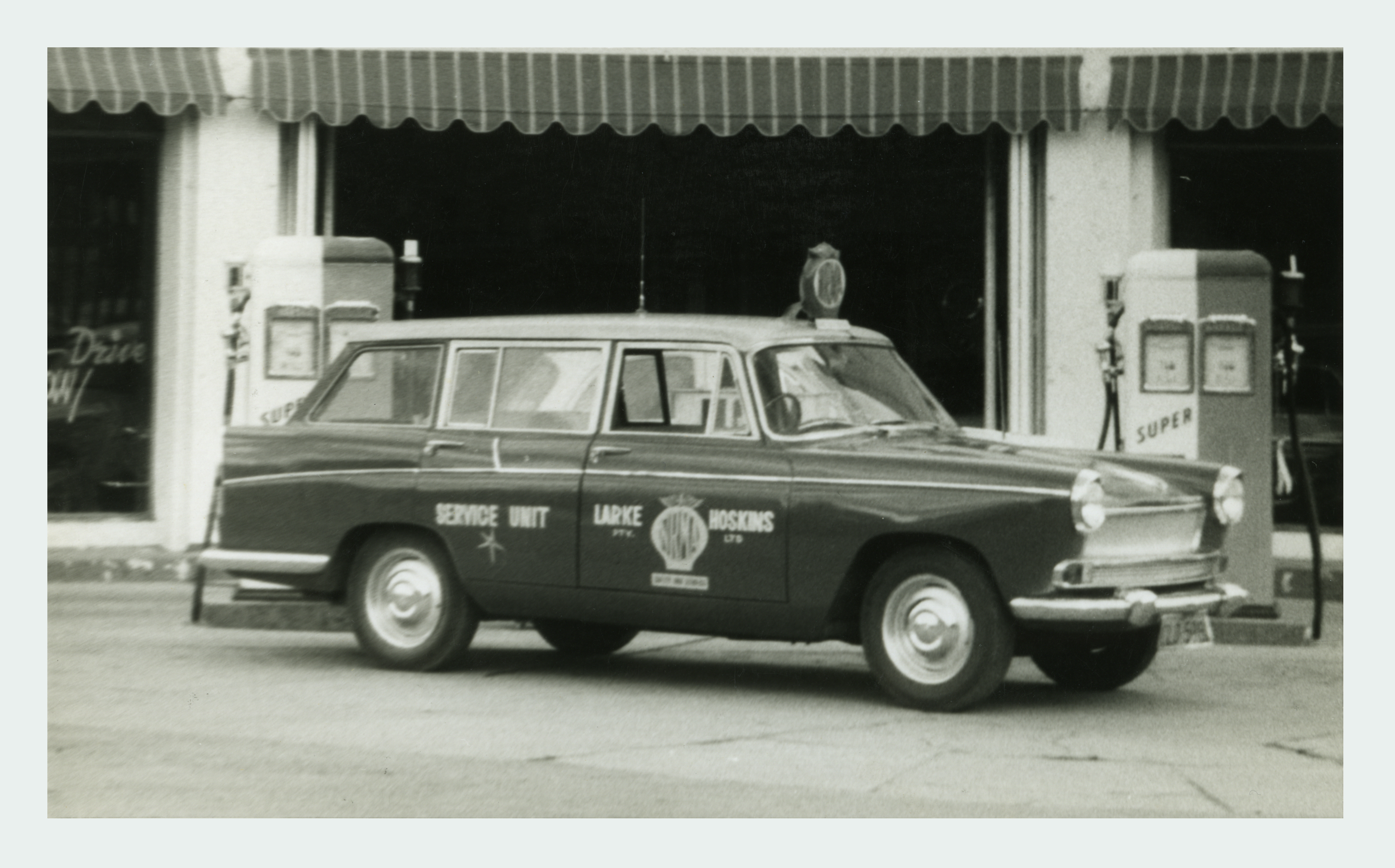
Australian Austin A60 station wagon

The A55 Mk II entered production in Australia in 1959 with a 1,622 cc version of the B Series four-cylinder engine as the Austin A60. Australian use of the larger engine and the A60 name preceded British usage by two years. The A60 was replaced in 1962 by a revised model powered by a six-cylinder 2,433 cc B-series Blue Streak engine. It was marketed as the Austin Freeway and was produced by BMC Australia until 1965.

== A60 Cambridge ==
A60
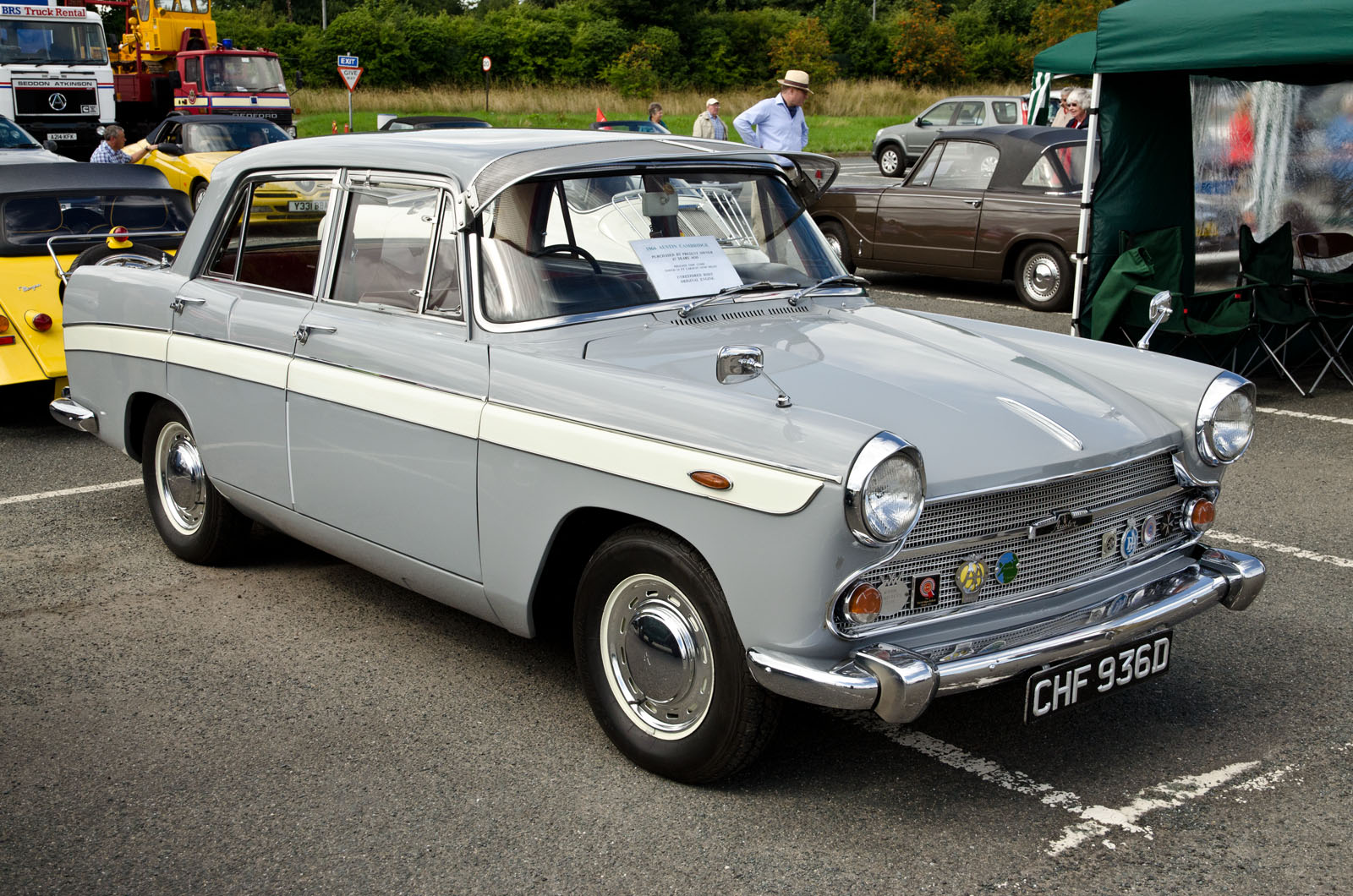

Overview
- Production: 1961–1969

Body and chassis
- Related: Morris Oxford series VI

Powertrain
- Engine: 1.6 L B-Series I4; 1.5 L diesel I4
- Transmission: 3-speed automatic 4-speed manual

Dimensions
- Wheelbase: 100.3 in (2,548 mm)
- Length: 174.5 in (4,432 mm)
- Width: 63.5 in (1,613 mm)
- Height: 58.5 in (1,486 mm)
- Kerb weight: 2,464 lb (1,118 kg)

An upgraded Cambridge model, now called the A60, was introduced in October 1961. It included a new 1.6-litre version of the B-Series straight-four engine which had first been used in the MGA. Power is 61 hp (45 kW) at 4500 rpm. Modified styling included side chrome stripes – some models with contrasting colour infills – and reduced fins on the rear wings. The style continued to be known as "Farina". This body covered a chassis that was slightly longer in wheelbase and wider in track than the A55. This allowed three people to be accommodated on the rear seat. Anti-roll bars were added to both front and rear suspension. An estate version with the petrol engine, called the Countryman, was also offered.The A60 from 1966 was offered with many optional extras including a more powerful dual carburetor version to keep up with increasing competition from the Continent and Japan.

A diesel version was introduced in 1961 for export cars and was available in the UK from 1962. Early manual models had the option of column gear change. The Borg Warner three-speed Type 35 automatic transmission was an option, the first British car to be fitted with this type, with the selector on the steering column. A 1.5-litre diesel option, mainly for the taxi trade, was introduced in November 1962. With only 40 hp (30 kW), top speed was limited to 110 km/h (68 mph).

The A60 Cambridge sold well, with 276,534 being built before production finally ended in 1969. Its intended successor, the front-wheel-drive Austin 1800 of 1964, did not affect sales, so Cambridge production was continued until 1969 at the Morris plant at Cowley when the Austin Maxi took over production line. The Morris Oxford version continued in production until 1971, when the Morris Marina was launched.

Austin A60 saloons assembled in Ireland by Brittain Smith of Portobello, Dublin 2 were identifiable by the use of Morris Oxford series VI tail-lights. The last of these were produced in 1970, and some were registered in 1971. The A60 Cambridge was effectively replaced by the Austin Maxi hatchback in April 1969, while the Oxford continued until early 1971, when it was replaced by the Morris Marina.

Both a manual and automatic version of the A60 were tested by The Motor magazine in 1961. The manual had a top speed of 80.4 mph (129.4 km/h) and could accelerate from 0–60 mph (97 km/h) in 19.8 seconds. A touring fuel consumption of 25.1 miles per imperial gallon (11.3 L/100 km; 20.9 mpg_{‑US}) was recorded. The test car cost £883 including taxes of £278. The automatic was slightly slower, with a top speed of 77.9 mph (125.4 km/h) and acceleration from 0–60 mph (97 km/h) in 24.9 seconds. A touring fuel consumption of 28.9 miles per imperial gallon (9.8 L/100 km; 24.1 mpg_{‑US}) was recorded. The car cost £982 including taxes of £309.

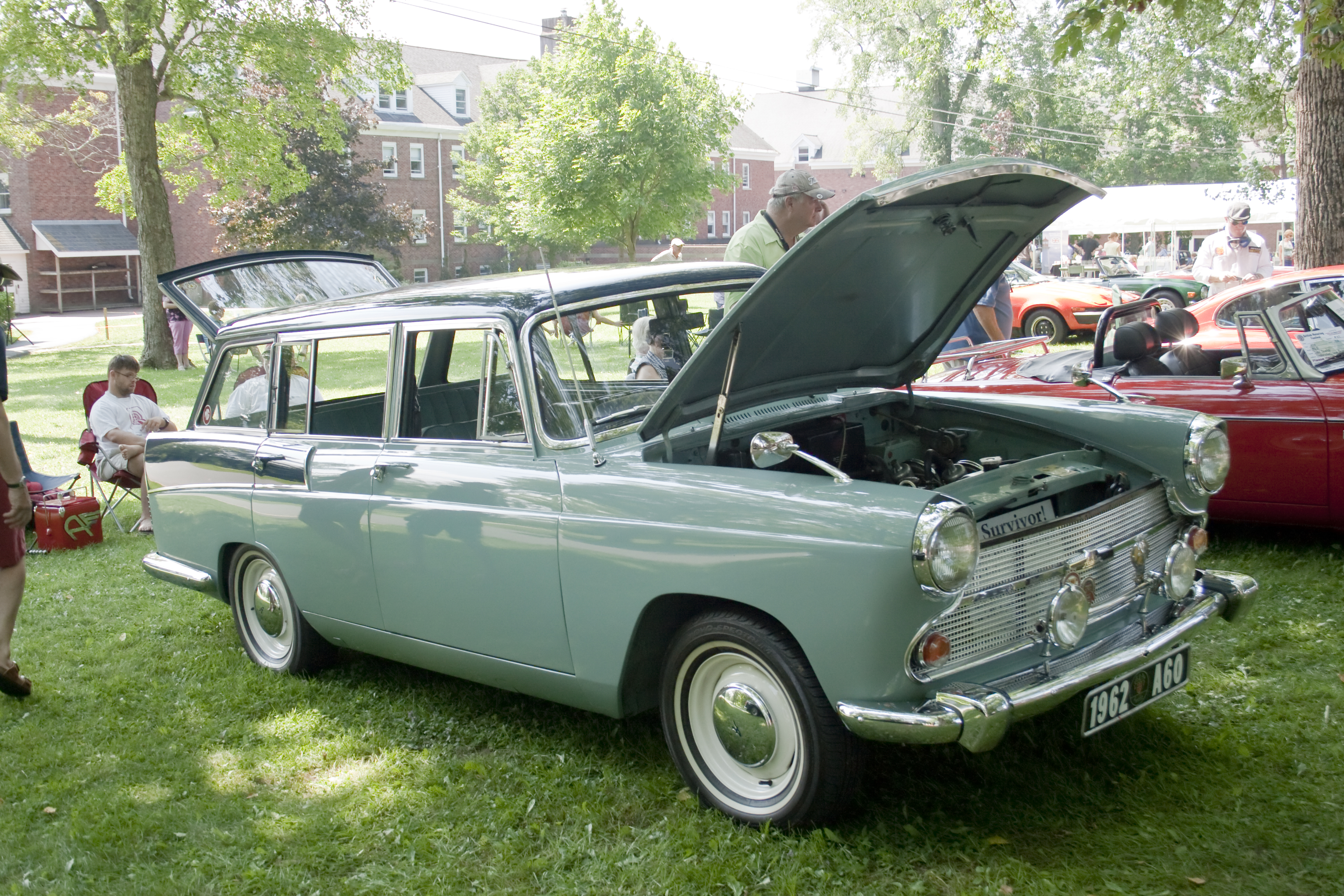
Austin A60 Cambridge estate

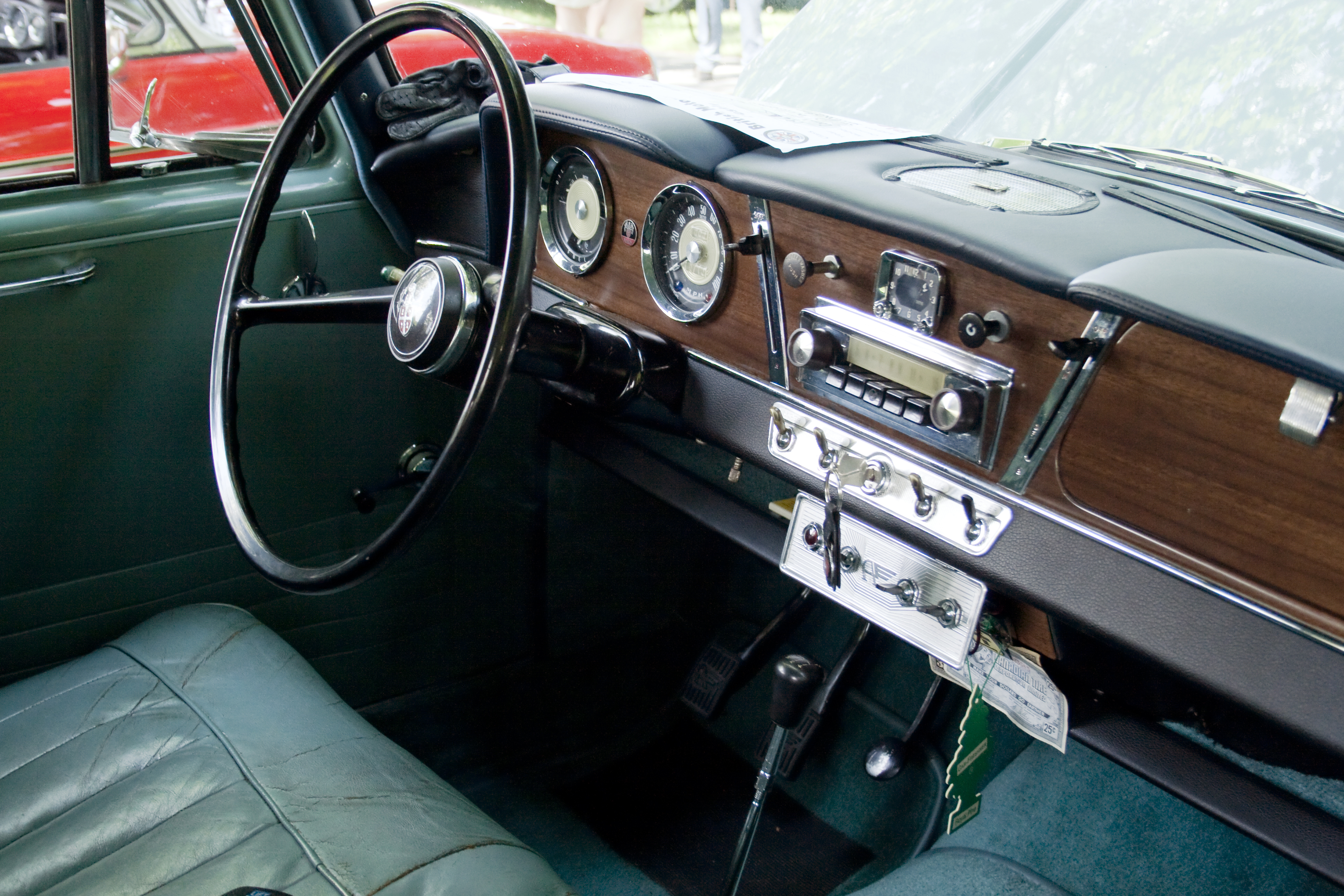
Austin A60 Cambridge estate interior
