= MG VA =

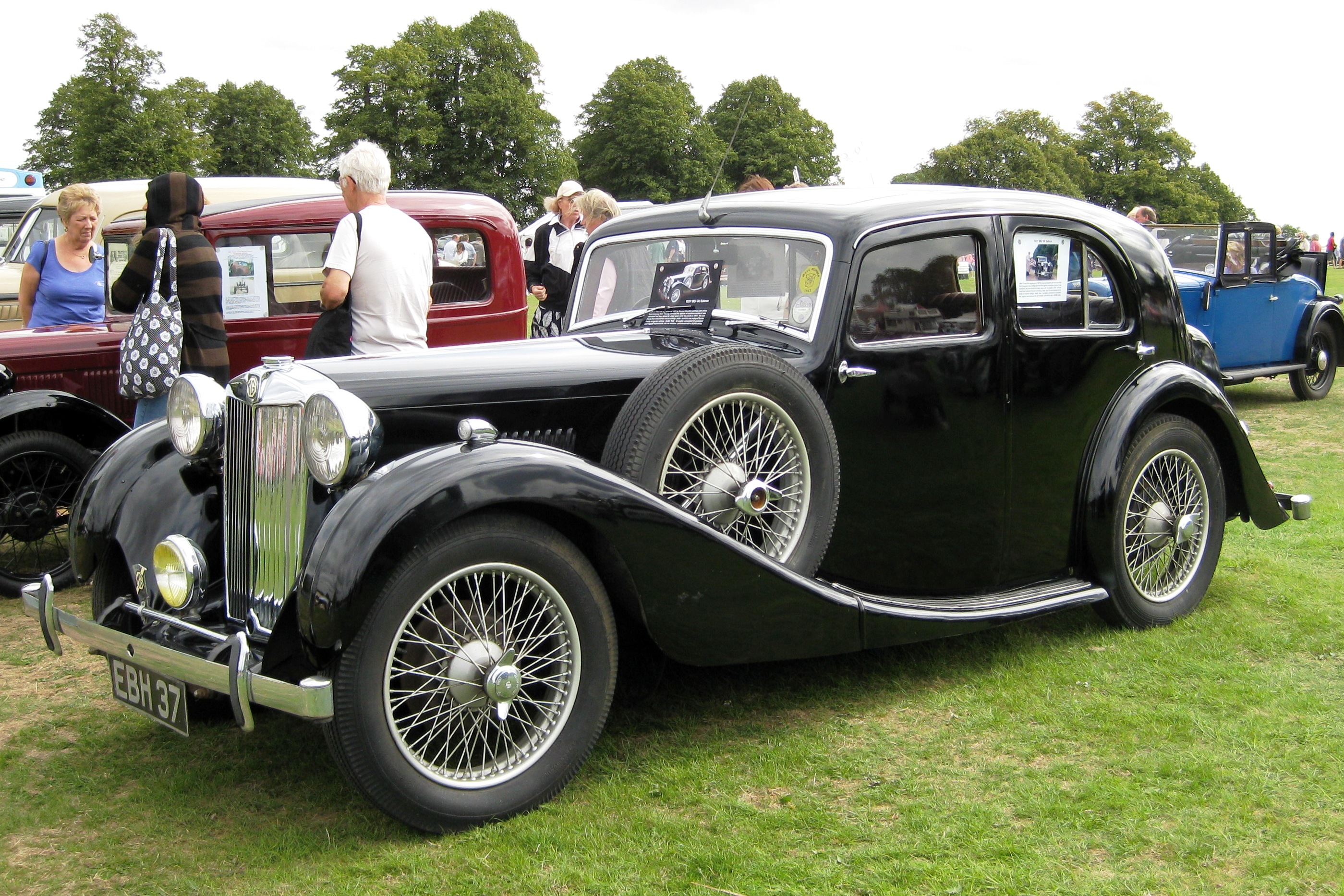
- 4-door sports saloon

Overview
- Manufacturer: MG (Morris)
- Production: 1937–1939
- Assembly: Abingdon-on-Thames, Berkshire, England

Body and chassis
- Body style: 4-door sports saloon 4-seater open tourer drophead coupé

Powertrain
- Engine: 1548 cc Straight-4
- Transmission: 4-speed manual

Dimensions
- Wheelbase: 108 inches (2743 mm)
- Length: 169 inches (4293 mm)
- Width: 62 inches (1575 mm)

Chronology
- Predecessor: MG NA Magnette saloon
- Successor: MG Y-type

The MG VA, or MG 1½-litre as it was originally marketed, is a motor car that was produced by MG between February 1937 and September 1939 and was the smallest of the three sports saloons they produced in the late 1930s, the others being the SA and WA.

The car used a tuned version of the push-rod, overhead valve four-cylinder Morris TPBG type engine that was also fitted to the Wolseley 12/48 and Morris Twelve series III. The MG version had twin SU carburettors and developed 54 bhp (40 kW) at 4500 rpm. Drive was to the live rear axle via a four-speed manual gearbox with synchromesh on the top three ratios, though on some early cars it was only on the top two speeds. 19-inch wire wheels were fitted, and the 10-inch (250 mm) drum brakes were hydraulically operated using a Lockheed system. In-built hydraulic jacks were standard. Suspension was by half-elliptic springs all round with a live rear axle and beam front axle. Luvax shock absorbers were fitted, the rear ones adjustable from the dashboard.

== Bodies ==
The four-door saloon body was made in-house by Morris and had the traditional MG grille flanked by two large chromium-plated headlights. Unlike the SA the front doors did not have separate quarter light windows. The spare wheel was carried on the left front wing, with a second spare on the other side as an option. Inside there were individual seats in front and a bench seat at the rear, all with leather covering. A fitted radio was an option.

A special version of the car was made for police use and had a 1707 cc engine and calibrated speedometer.

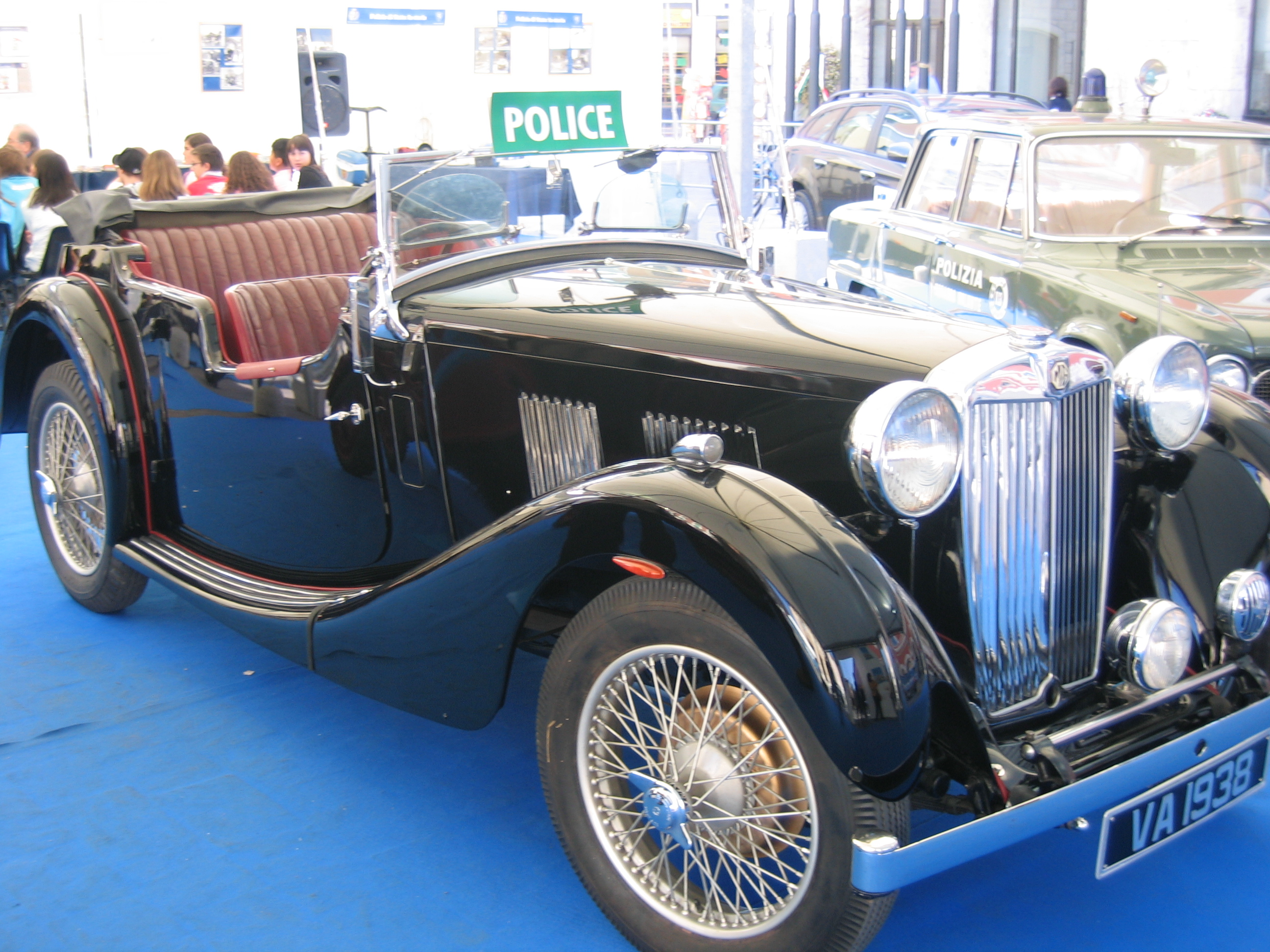
Police special

Morris TPBG

Overview
- Manufacturer: Morris

Layout
- Configuration: in-line four
- Displacement: 1548cc, 94.59 ci
- Cylinder bore: 69.5 mm, 2.73 in
- Piston stroke: 102 mm, 4.01 in
- Cylinder block material: cast in one with the skirt of the crankcase; three-bearing crankshaft; low-expansion aluminium alloy pistons, connecting rods steel
- Cylinder head material: detachable with valve gear intact
- Valvetrain: Overhead valves are operated by pushrods from the camshaft by the block's crankcase skirt. drive to the camshaft is by silent duplex roller chain

Combustion
- Fuel system: twin SU carburettors and automatic electric fuel pump
- Fuel type: petrol
- Oil system: a spur gear pump driven from the camshaft pushes oil to main and big-end bearings, camshaft bearings and valve gear from a reservoir in the sump
- Cooling system: water circulated by centrifugal impeller and with thermostatic control

Output
- Power output: 54 bhp (40 kW) at 4500 rpm Treasury rating 11.98hp

Chronology
- Predecessor: Morris 12 sidevalve

The British Motor magazine tested a VA tourer which reached a top speed of just over 76 mph (122 km/h) and a 0-50 mph time of 15.8 seconds. With the windscreen folded down, the top speed increased to nearly 82 mph (132 km/h).

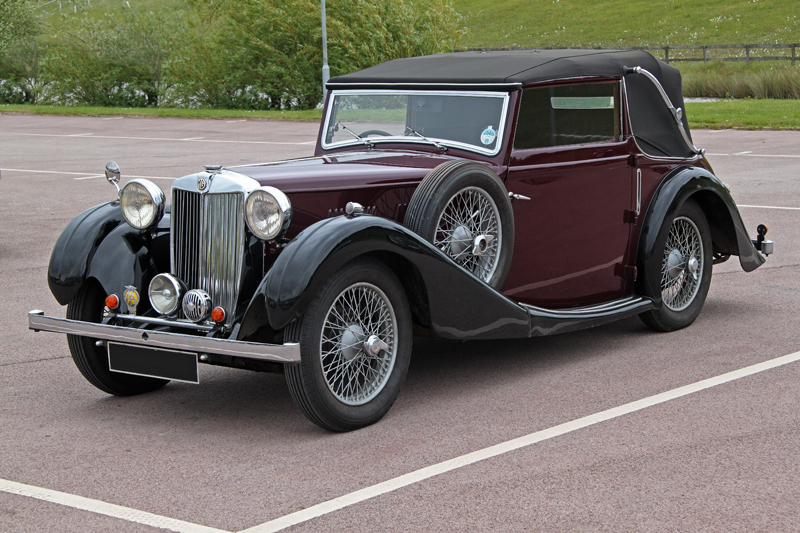
Tickford drophead coupé

The factory could also supply the car as a Tickford drophead coupé or as a 2-door open four-seater tourer. The saloon was priced at around GBP325, the four-seater tourer GBP280 and the Tickford coupé GBP351 all prices depending on exact specification. 564 tourers and 591 coupés were made. A very few chassis, probably only two, went to external coachbuilders.

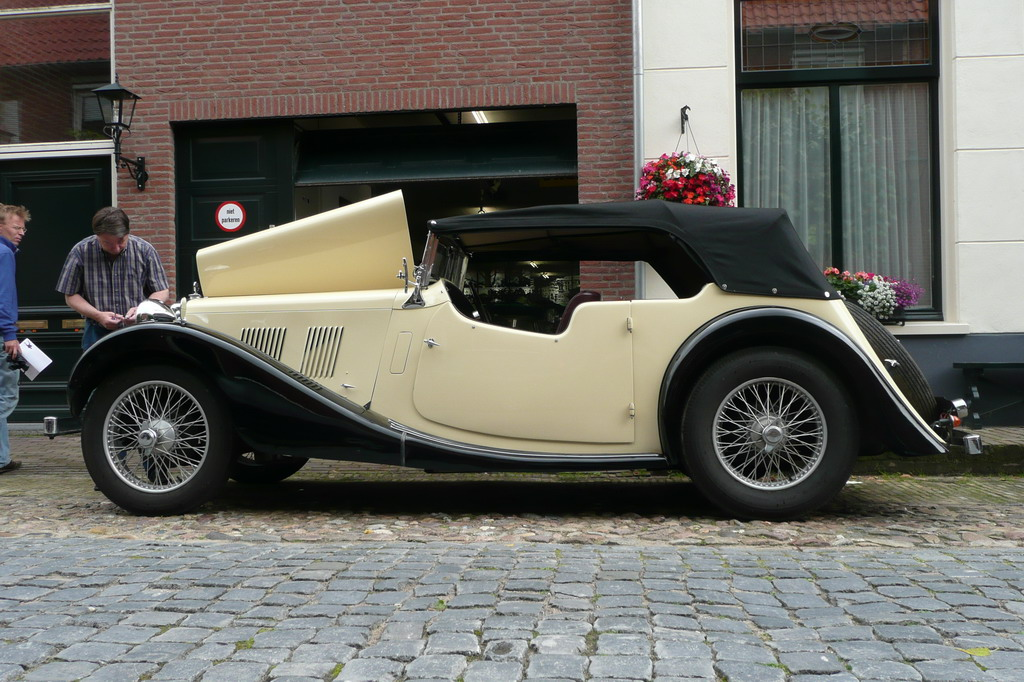
2-door open four-seater tourer

Production stopped with the outbreak of World War II in 1939. After the war, MG launched the Y-Type to fill the small saloon slot.
