= MG Y-type =

MG Y-Type
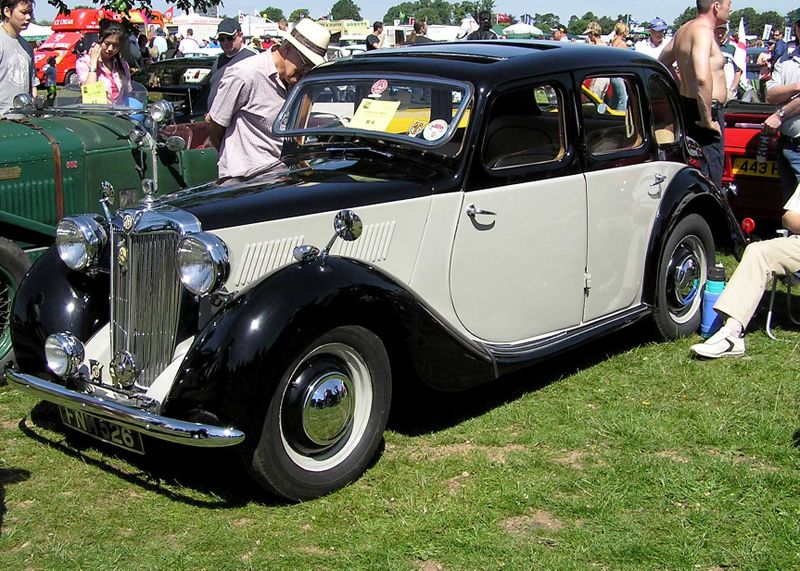
- MG YA

Overview
- Manufacturer: MG (Morris)
- Production: 1947–1953
- Assembly: Abingdon-on-Thames, Berkshire, England
- Designer: Gerald Palmer

Body and chassis
- Class: sports saloon tourer

Dimensions
- Wheelbase: 99-inch (2,500 mm)
- Length: 164-inch (4,200 mm)
- Width: 59-inch (1,500 mm)
- Height: 57 in (1,400 mm)

Chronology
- Predecessor: MG VA
- Successor: MG ZA Magnette

The MG Y-Type is an automobile produced by MG in England from 1947 to 1953. It was offered in four-door saloon and limited production open four-seat tourer versions.

When production ceased, 8,336 "Y" Types had been produced. While the original production records were lost or destroyed when the factory closed it is currently thought that of the 6,935 Y chassis that were made they were split 6,133 were "Y" saloons and 902 were "YT" Tourers. (The exact split is a subject of ongoing research and is always subject to amendment as new evidence comes to light.) There were 1,301 were "YB" saloons.

== MG YA (1947–1951) ==
MG YA
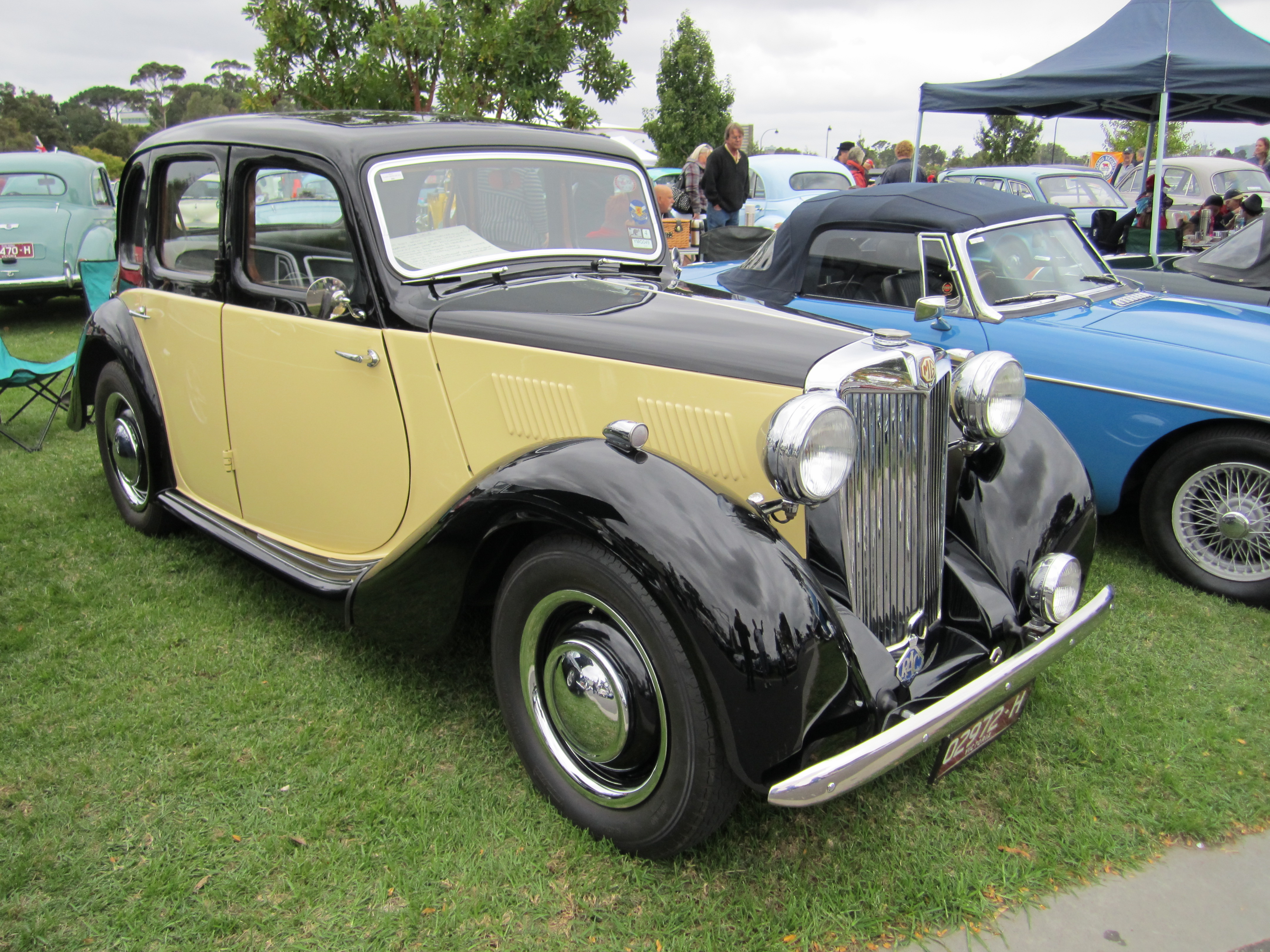
- MG YA

Overview
- Production: 1947–1951

Body and chassis
- Body style: 4 door saloon

Powertrain
- Engine: 1250 cc XPAG I4, single SU carburettor

=== Development and launch ===
In the years immediately before the Second World War, MG had sought to supplement its popular range of ‘Midget’ sports cars with three saloons of various sizes and engine capacities. These were the "S", "V" and "W" models. The MG factory at Abingdon-on-Thames had grown by developing what were in essence Morris based products and they were always to be closely associated with what was to become the Nuffield Organization (Morris, Wolseley and later Riley). The "WA" had an engine displacement of 2,561 cc, the "SA" 2,288 cc and the smallest of the group, the "VA", had an engine of 1,548 cc. The next development to the range was to include one more saloon, of smaller engine capacity than the "VA", and for a component base the Cowley design office turned to Morris’s Ten-Four Series M saloon, which was introduced during 1938, and the smaller Eight Series E which was launched at the Earls Court Motor show the same year.

The prototype "Y" Type was constructed in 1939 with an intended launch at the Earls Court Motor show, the following year. However, as a result of the hostilities the public had to wait a further eight years before production commenced. All prototypes originating from the MG Factory at Abingdon were allocated numbers prefixed by the letters EX; this practice continued until the mid-fifties. Although the prototype of the MG "Y" Type was primarily a Morris concept from Cowley, much of the ‘fleshing out’ was completed at Abingdon. As a result it was allocated the prototype number EX.166.

When the car was launched the MG Sales Literature stated "A brilliant new Member of the famous MG breed. This new One and a Quarter Litre car perpetuates the outstanding characteristics of its successful predecessors – virile acceleration, remarkable ‘road manner,’ instant response to controls, and superb braking. A ‘lively’ car, the new One and a Quarter Litre provides higher standards of performance." The UK price of the car was £525.0.0 ex works plus purchase tax of £146.11.8d.

=== Body and chassis ===
Gerald Palmer was responsible for body styling and, in essence he took a Morris Eight Series E four-door bodyshell in pressed steel, added a swept tail and rear wings, and also a front-end MG identity in the shape of their well-known upright grille. The MG 1 1/4 Litre Saloon would retain the traditional feature of separately mounted headlights at a time when Morris was integrating headlamps into the front wing and it was also to have a separate chassis under this pressed-steel bodywork, even though the trend in the industry was towards ‘unitary construction’.

The car featured an independent front suspension layout designed by Gerald Palmer and Jack Daniels (an MG draughtsman). Independent front suspension was very much the latest technology at the time and the "Y" Type became the first Nuffield product and one of the first British production cars with this feature. The separate chassis facilitated the ‘Jackall System’, which consisted of four hydraulically activated rams that were bolted to the chassis, two at the front and two at the rear. The jacks were connected to a Jackall Pump on the bulkhead that enabled the front, the back, or the entire car to be raised to facilitate a wheel change.

=== Engine ===
The power unit was a single carburettor version of the 1,250 cc engine used in the latest MG-TB. This engine, the XPAG, went on to power both the MG-TC and MG-TD series. The MG Y Type saloon developed 46 bhp at 4,800 rpm, with 58.5 lb ft of torque at 2,400 rpm, the YT Tourer (with the higher lift camshaft and twin carburettors) develop 54 bhp (40 kW). With the exception of only the Rover Ten, which managed 2 additional bhp, the "Y" Type had more power than other British saloons of similar size. Indeed at the time many manufacturers were still producing side valve engines.

=== Interior ===
The MG "Y" Type had an extremely high standard of interior furnishing and finish, in accordance with the best British traditions. The facing surfaces of all seats were leather, as were the door pockets. The rear of the front seats were made from Rexine, a form of leathercloth, which matched the leather fronts, as were the door panels themselves. A roller blind was fitted to the rear window as an anti-glare mechanism (not a privacy screen as many think).

Considerable use of wood was made in the internal trim of the "Y" Type. Door windows, front and rear screens were framed in burr walnut, the instrument panel set in bookmatched veneer offsetting the passenger side glove box.

The speedometer, clock, and three-gauge cluster of oil pressure, fuel and ammeter, were set behind octagonal chrome frames, a subtle iteration of the MG badge theme later replicated in the MG TF.

=== Performance and contemporary impressions ===
A car tested by the British magazine The Motor in 1951 had a top speed of 69.6 mph (112.0 km/h) and could accelerate from 0–60 mph (97 km/h) in 29.9 seconds. A fuel consumption of 29.5 miles per imperial gallon (9.6 L/100 km; 24.6 mpg_{‑US}) was recorded. The test car cost £880 including taxes.

The rival Autocar Magazine recorded similar results in a 1949 report, at which time it was already possible to see as outdated a car which "virtually alone ... [was] still offering the form of external appearance to which many keener motorists still cling, in spite of the wider acceptance of shapes that have come to be called modern". Always keen to highlight positive aspects of any car, the Autocar testers appreciated several features on the 1¼ litre MG saloon which had been dropped in newer car designs, such as "front seats [which were] individually adjustable", a (small) sliding roof panel and a rear window blind. However, the car's "fairly high" 7.2:1 compression ratio was problematic in view of the 72 octane "Pool petrol" which UK fuel buyers were still obliged to use. Pinking was experienced "when accelerating from the lower speeds" as well as "some running on after [the engine was switched off]". The testers had the opportunity to drive their car in mainland Europe and reported that the power unit was "a revelation ... [with] better quality fuel".

== MG YT Tourer (1948–1950) ==
MG YT
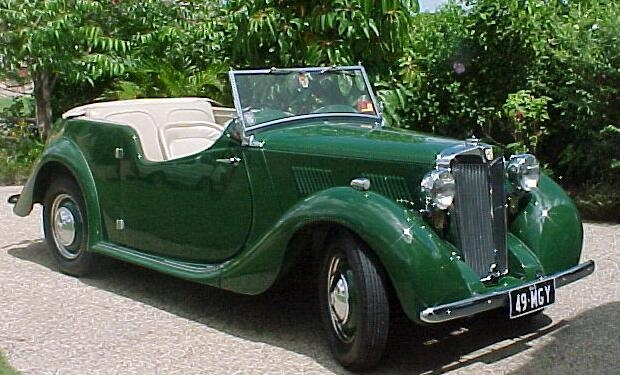

Overview
- Production: 1948–1950

Body and chassis
- Body style: 4-seat open tourer

Powertrain
- Engine: 1250 cc XPAG I4, twin SU carburettors

In 1948 several (currently believed to be 9) "YA" Types (consisting of chassis, engines and some body parts) were imported into Switzerland and given cabriolet bodywork by various coachbuilders, such as Reinbolt & Christé. The idea of the open four-seat tourer had been popular before the war, and in theory there was still a market. As a result a "TC" specification of the XPAG engine was married to a pressed-steel open body with fully folding hood and coach-built doors.

A production tourer, the MG "YT", was launched at the Motor Show in 1948. It was available for export only in both right- and left-hand-drive models. As far as we know currently (September 2026) only 902 of these cars were produced when production ceased in 1950—it was not the success that MG had hoped for, and indeed other British manufacturers were also having problems selling open-tourer versions of their saloons.

The "YT" Tourer did not benefit from ‘displayed’ woodwork but had the same standard of seat trim. It did have more instrumentation, in that there was a tachometer (or rev counter) in front of the driver, the speedometer was positioned in front of the passenger with a central bank of subsidiary dials in the centre, giving a similar sporting appearance to the TC with a "double scuttle" dash.

== MG YB (1951–1953) ==
MG YB
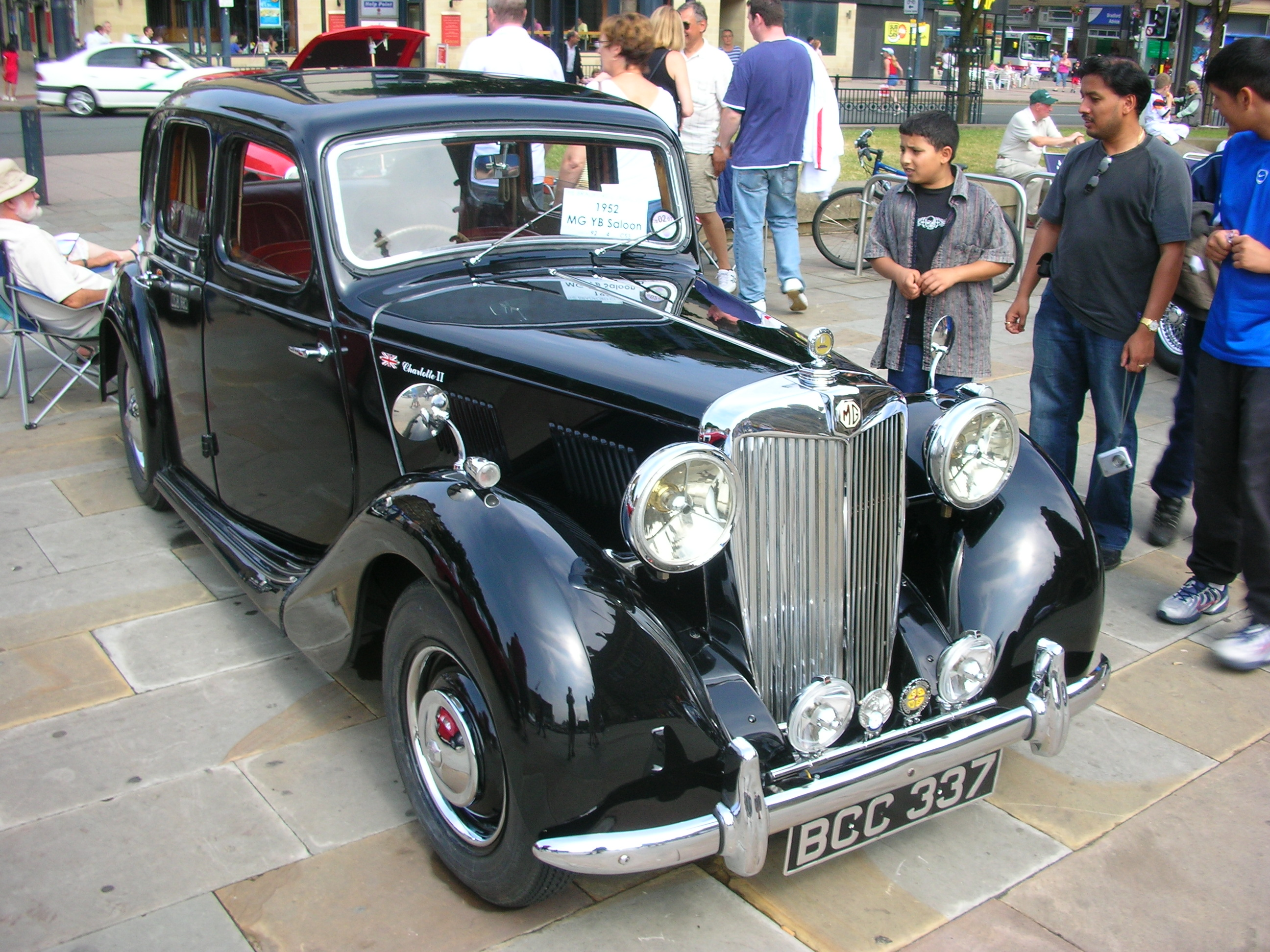

Overview
- Production: 1951–1953

Body and chassis
- Body style: 4 door saloon

Powertrain
- Engine: 1250 cc XPAG I4, single SU carburettor

In 1952 MG Car Company updated the "Y" Type and an improved model was launched, known as the "YB". The "YB" had a completely new Lockheed twin leading shoe braking system, 15 inch wheels and a much more modern hypoid type of back axle. Production numbers - 1,301.

Road holding was also improved by the introduction of smaller 15-inch (380 mm) wheels (the "Y" and the "Y/T" both had 16-inch (410 mm) wheels). The "YB" also had an anti-roll bar fitted to the front of the car and stronger shock absorbers, or dampers, were fitted.

Little else was changed about the car, which was by now looking extremely dated. The YB was produced until the end of 1953 and the MG ZA Magnette was introduced in 1954.

== Production numbers ==
The original production records of the MG Y Type were lost or destroyed when the MG Works at Abingdon closed in 1981. What is known for definite is that there were a total of 8,336 Y chassis produced of which 7,035 were MG YA or MG YT (the exact mix was not known) and 1,301 were MG YB. The original evidence pointed to the split of MG YA to MG YT was 6,158 to 877. This is most often found quoted in books and magazines. Following over 10 years of extensive and world wide research by the International MG Y Type Register, it is currently proven that these numbers are incorrect and the correct split is now put more correctly at 6,131 MG YA and 904 MG YTs.

== International MG Y Type Register ==
These Wikipedia notes are provided by the International MG Y Type Register.
