= MGY =

MGY or a variant thereof is used as an abbreviation for:

- Megagray (MGy) and milligray (mGy), SI derived units of the gray (absorbed radiation dose)
- mgy, MGY, mmgy, MMgy, or MMGY: Million gallons per year

MGY as an identifier has been used to denote:

- Dayton-Wright Brothers Airport, IATA code
- Montgomeryshire, historic county in Wales, Chapman code
- The maritime call sign of RMS Titanic's radiotelegraph station

MGY may also refer to:

- MG Y-type, an MG car
