= Gerald Palmer (car designer) =

British car designer

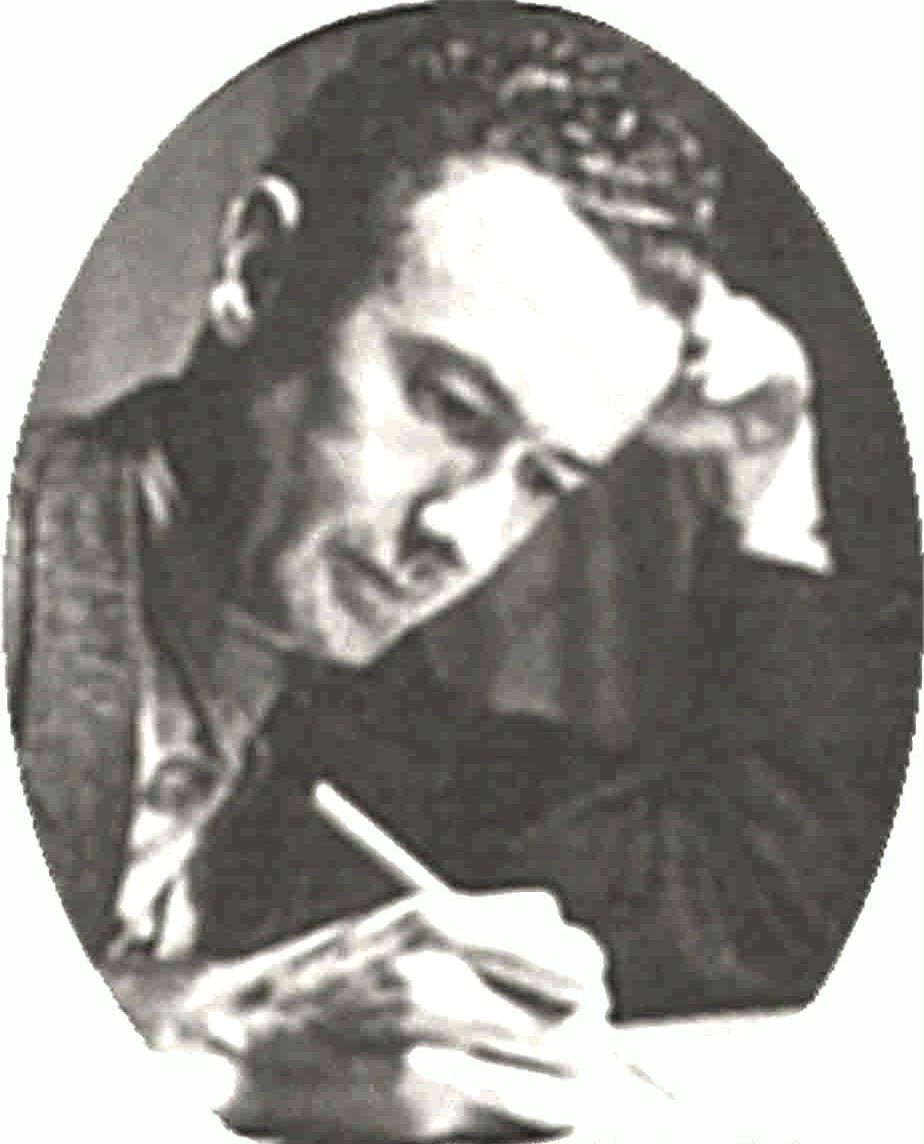
- Born: Gerald Marley Palmer; 30 January 1911
- Died: 23 June 1999 (aged 88)
- Occupation: Car designer
- Known for: Designs including: MG Y-type, Jowett Javelin, MG Magnette, Wolseley 4/44, Riley Pathfinder Wolseley 6/90

Gerald Marley Palmer (30 January 1911 – 23 June 1999) was a British car designer.

== Background ==
Born in England, Palmer grew up in Southern Rhodesia, now Zimbabwe, where his father was chief engineer to the state-run railways. Another source says that he was born in Rhodesia on 30 January 1911. In 1959, he married Diana Varley (died 1989), whom he had met at Scammell's drawing office. They had one daughter.

== Career ==
=== Apprenticeship ===
Palmer returned to England in 1927 where he started an engineering apprenticeship with Scammell, the commercial vehicle builders, and studied at the Regent Street Polytechnic.

=== Morris ===
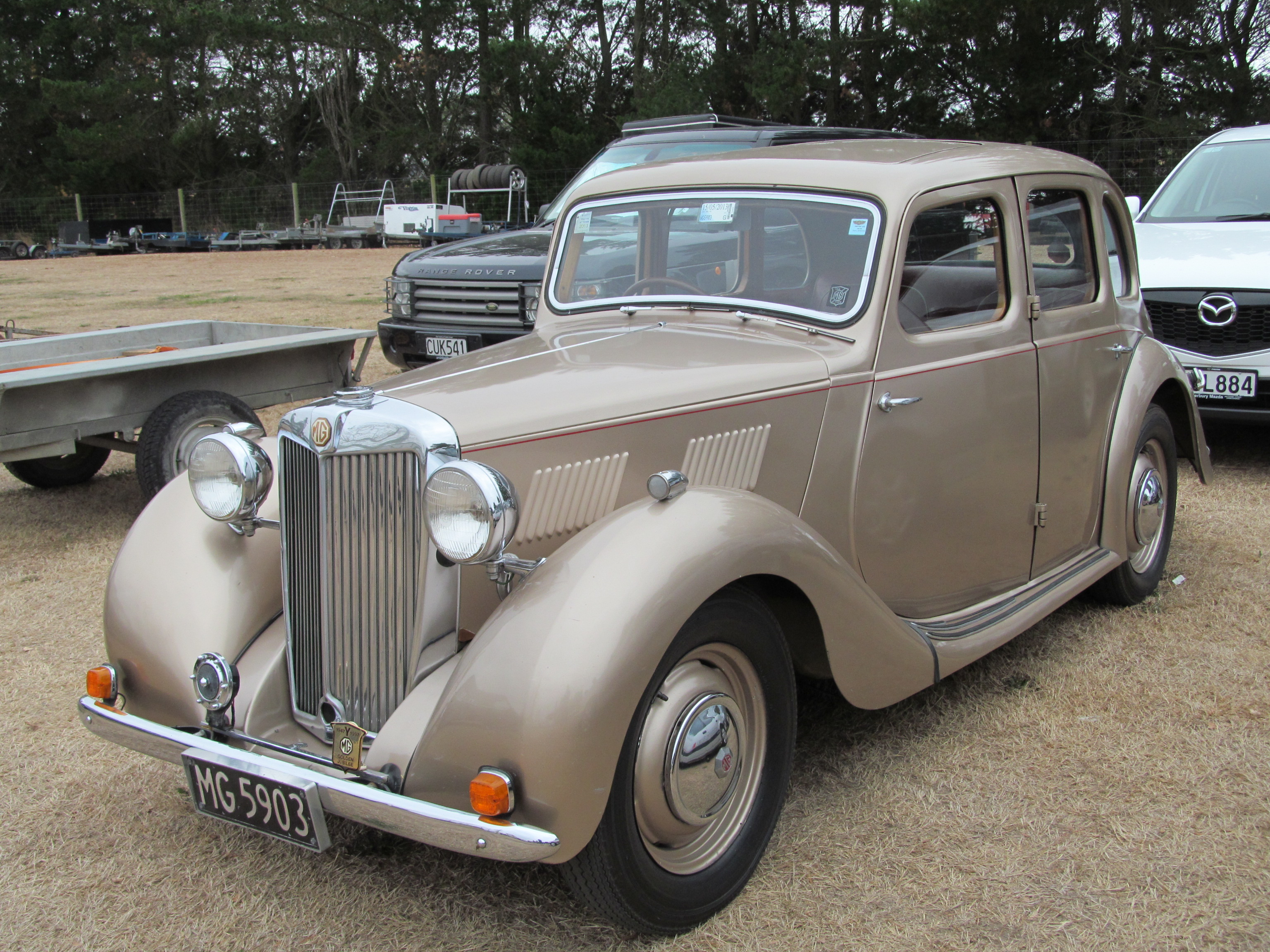
MG YA

While still training, in his spare time Palmer designed and built a sports car for the racing driver Joan Richmond and called it the Deroy after a tin mine his father owned in Mozambique. He completed the Deroy in 1936 and drove the car to the M.G. works at Abingdon where he showed it to Cecil Kimber. Kimber arranged for Palmer to be interviewed by chief engineer Vic Oak, which resulted in Palmer getting a job in the Morris drawing office at Cowley with responsibility for development of a new generation of M.G. cars. During 1937 and 1938, Palmer was responsible for leading the design of the MG Y-type which, due to the onset of hostilities, would not begin production until 1947.

=== World War II ===
With the outbreak of war in 1939, Gerald Palmer was reassigned to work on portable anaesthetic apparatus, the Oxford Vaporiser, for front line use. On completion of this he pursued development on a new two-stroke engine and production of Tiger Moth training aircraft.

=== Jowett ===
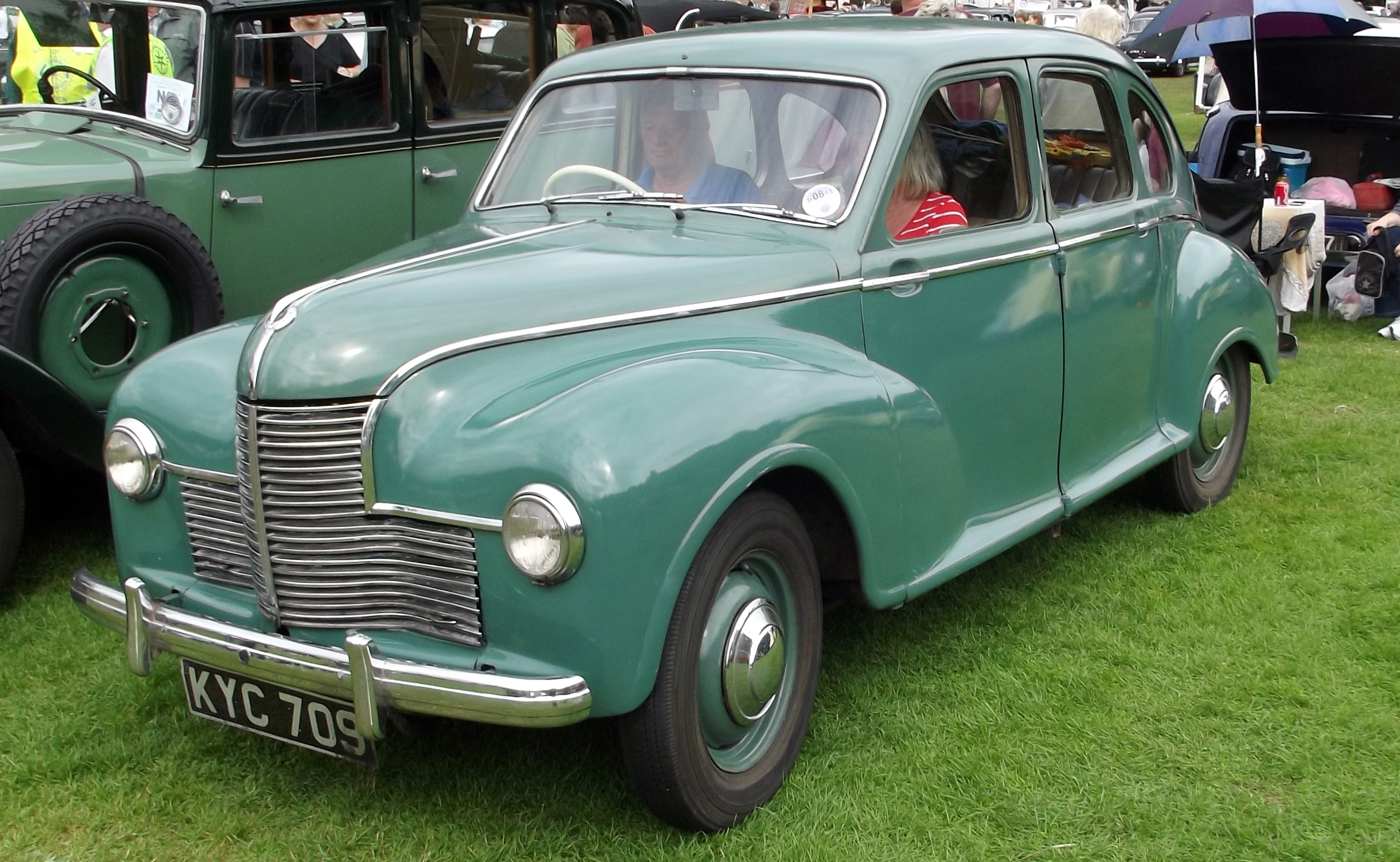
Jowett Javelin

Already looking beyond the war, Jowett cars of Bradford had decided it was time to move on from their basic range of cars and vans and their new managing director, Charles Reilly, placed an advertisement for a chief designer. The name of the company was not mentioned in the advertisement but at the age of 30 Palmer applied for the job. He initially had doubts when he found out who he would be working for as it meant moving from the motor industry heartlands to a small company not specially renowned for innovation. Charles Reilly must have been impressed as he pursued Palmer and in January 1942 persuaded him to accept the offer.

Starting with a clean sheet, Palmer went on to design the Jowett Javelin. Except for the gearbox and rear axle, Palmer designed all the parts for the car, including a new flat-four engine and unit body. The first prototype car was finished on 25 August 1944 and production started in late 1947, with cars reaching the first customers in 1948. The car was well received but was expensive and beyond the resources of the small Jowett company. There were problems with the engine and production volumes never reached the planned level. Body production had been outsourced to Briggs and they turned them out as ordered even though sales did not match resulting in a large stockpile and drain on Jowett's cash flow.

=== Morris again ===
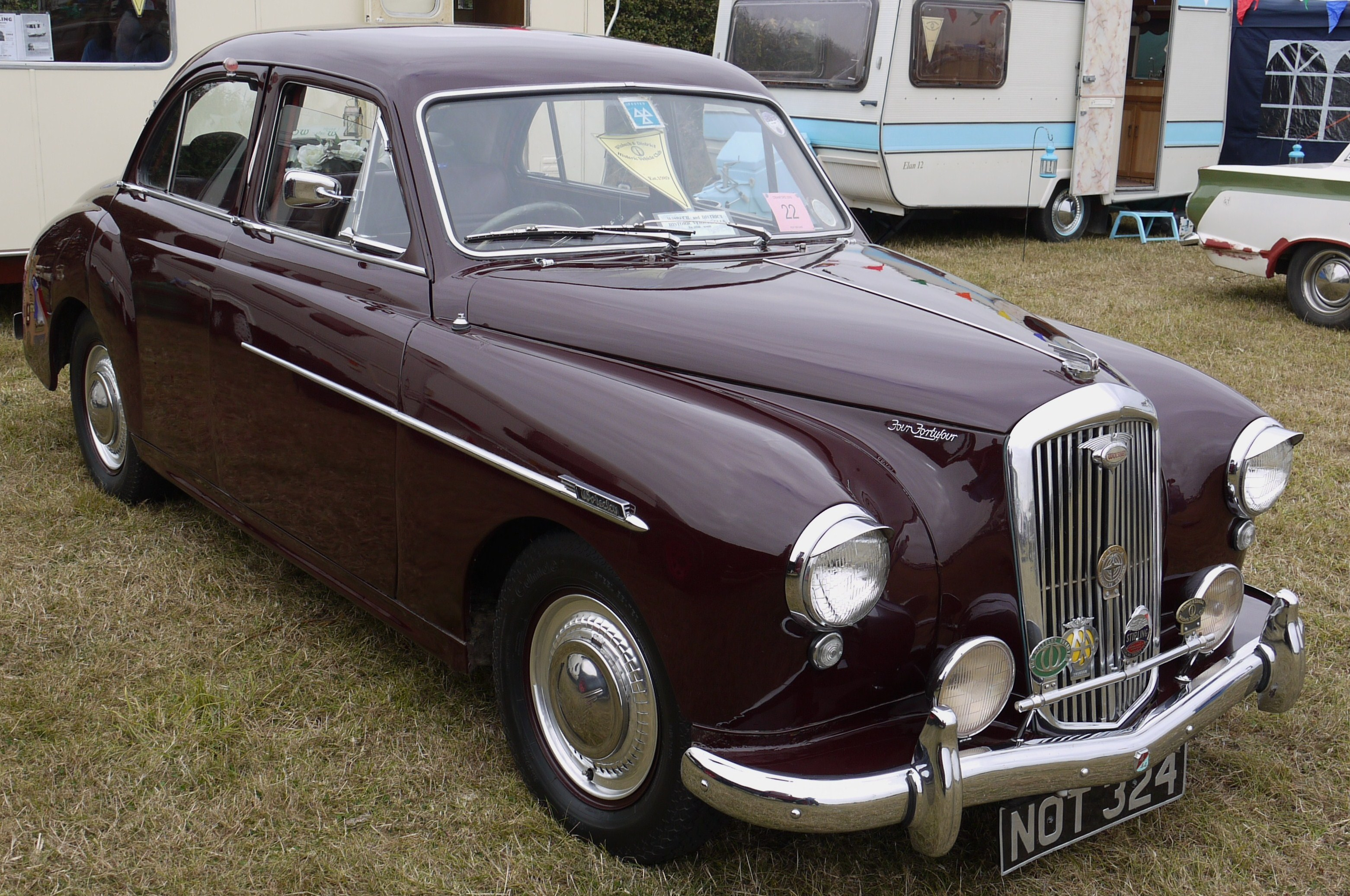
Wolseley 4/44

In 1949, Palmer left Jowett and returned to Morris where he took up the job of designer of a new range of cars for M.G., Riley and Wolseley. The results of this were the M.G. ZA Magnette and Wolseley 4/44.

=== BMC ===
In 1952, Palmer was made chief engineer of the British Motor Corporation (BMC), where he oversaw the design and launch of the Riley Pathfinder and Wolseley 6/90, also being involved in the design of the MGA Twin-cam engine. He became a director but, in 1955, fell foul of chairman Leonard Lord and was dismissed. He was succeeded by Alec Issigonis.

=== Vauxhall ===
Palmer then joined Vauxhall Motors, working with the team responsible for the Victor and Viva ranges.

== Retirement ==
Palmer retired in 1972, but did not give up on innovation. He claimed in his book, The Auto Architect, that he designed the Oxford Hoist, a device for assisting disabled people. He also restored and competed in a Type 44 Bugatti and a 2-litre Mercedes-Benz.

== Publications ==
- Palmer, Gerald; Balfour, Christopher (1998). Auto-Architect: the Autobiography of Gerald Palmer. Magna Press. ISBN 0951942360. or ISBN 0-9543121-1-2
