= Wolseley 6/90 =

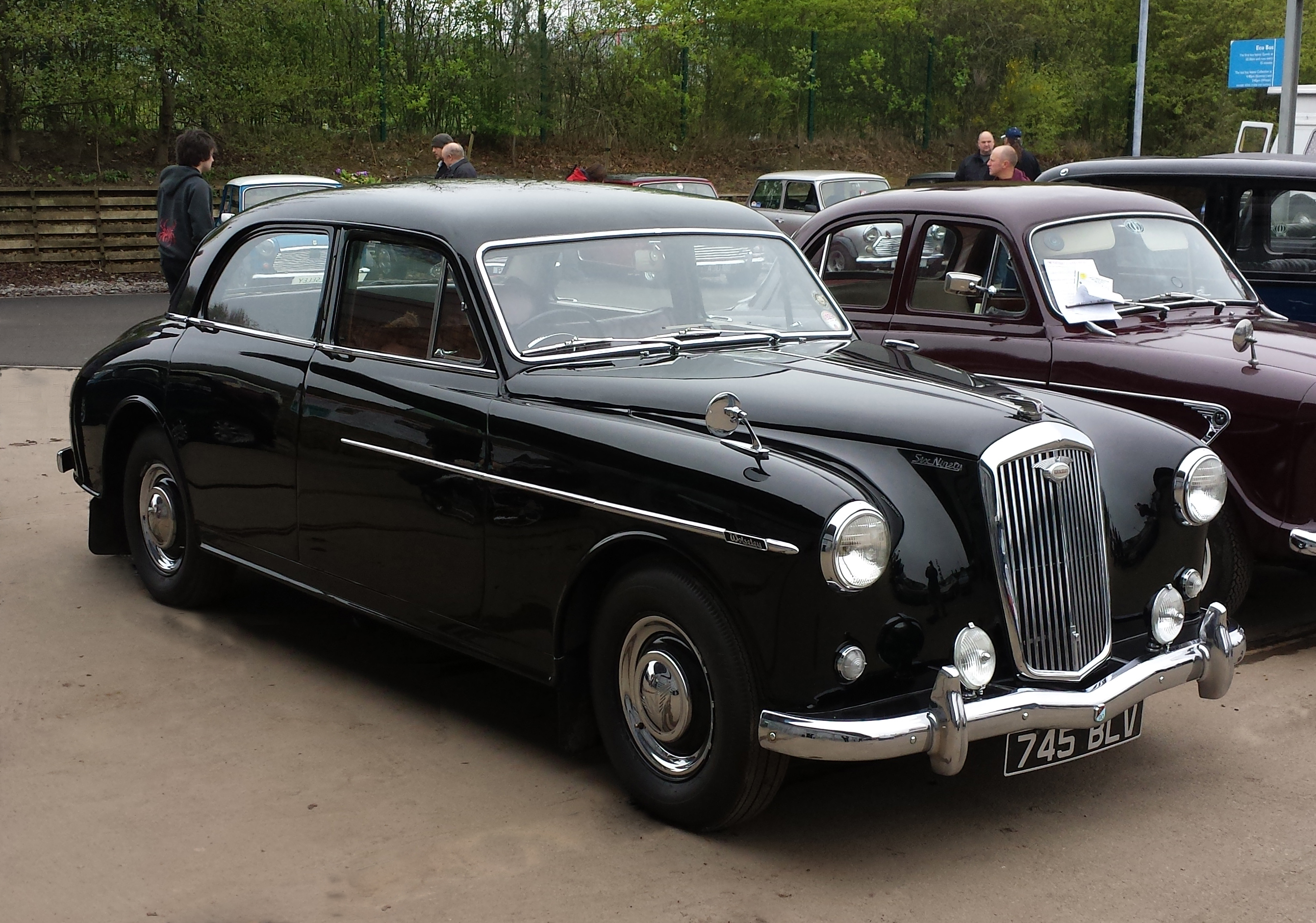
- Series III first registered March 1959

Overview
- Manufacturer: BMC
- Production: 1954–1959; 11,852 made
- Designer: Gerald Palmer

Body and chassis
- Class: Mid-size car
- Body style: 4-door saloon
- Layout: FR layout
- Related: Riley Two-Point-Six

Powertrain
- Engine: 3.0 L C-Series I6

Dimensions
- Wheelbase: 113.5 in (2,883 mm)
- Length: 188 in (4,775 mm)
- Width: 67.8 in (1,722 mm)
- Height: 62 in (1,575 mm)

Chronology
- Predecessor: Wolseley 6/80
- Successor: Wolseley 6/99

The Wolseley 6/90 is a car produced by Wolseley Motors Limited in the United Kingdom from 1954 to 1959. Announced on the first day of the October 1954 British Motor Show, the 6/90 replaced the 6/80 as the company's flagship model. It was badged with Six-Ninety on the bonnet and with 6/90 on the bootlid.

Whereas the postwar austerity 6/80 had shared all but its radiator shell and interior finish with the Morris Six, the 6/90 design used the Italian-style body panels of the previous year's Riley Pathfinder, although (because big Wolseleys were all six-cylinder cars) not Riley's traditional sporting "big four" engine or its suspension. These Morris, Riley and Wolseley cars had all been designed by the Nuffield Organization before it merged with Austin to become BMC. All three marques would soon be heavily involved in BMC's badge engineering.

The Pathfinder and 6/90 were Nuffield designs. The Wolseley received the new BMC C-Series straight-6, an engine that produced 95 hp (71 kW) coupled to a four-speed manual transmission. The 6/90 was not given the Pathfinder's sophisticated rear suspension but later versions had Riley refinements like a right-hand gear lever on the floor.

The interior features a grey striped formica instrument panel and central large chrome mesh "cheese-cutter" speaker grille. The hand brake control was under the dash to the side of the steering column and the gearchange was column mounted opposite the dip switch. The leather trimmed front seats were mounted closely together and the rear bench had a fold down centre arm rest.

In total, 5776 of the Series I cars were made before the Series II 6/90 entered production in 1957.

The Motor magazine tested a 6/90 in 1955 and found it to have a top speed of 96 mph (154 km/h) and acceleration from 0-60 mph (97 km/h) in 17.3 seconds. A fuel consumption of 21.6 miles per imperial gallon (13.1 L/100 km; 18.0 mpg_{‑US}) was recorded. The test car cost £1063 including taxes.

It is also somewhat notorious for leading to the sacking of its designer Gerald Palmer (by BMC's Leonard Lord) in favour of Alec Issigonis.

== Series II ==
Series II 6/90s, introduced for 1957, included leaf springs on the live axle in the rear, a more conventional walnut dash and a floor-mounted gear lever — unusually on the right-hand side, on right-hand-drive cars. Overdrive or automatic transmission were available as options.

In production for only 8 months, the Series II gave way to the Series III in 1958 after only 1024 had been made.

== Series III ==
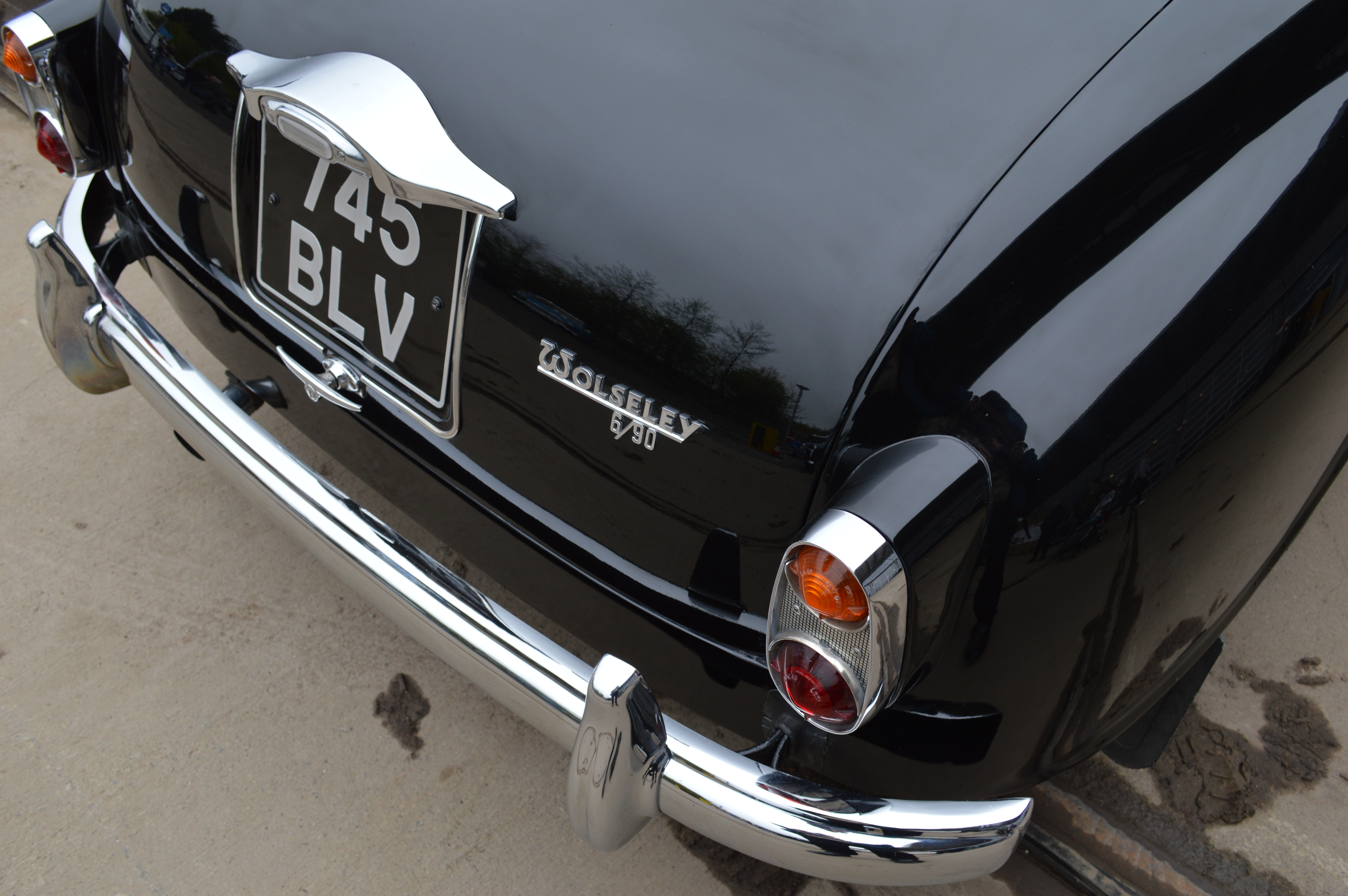
Rear of car registered March 1959

The Series III included larger power brakes and a larger rear window. This design was also available, rebadged, as the Riley Pathfinder's replacement, the short-lived Two-Point-Six. Total production for Series III cars was 5052.

Between 1954 and 1959, the 6/90 was the only car to bear the famous illuminated Wolseley radiator badge.

6/90 production ended in 1959 with the introduction of the Pininfarina-designed 6/99.

Until the early 1960s, the definitive British police car was a black Wolseley 6/90 with a brass Winkworth bell on its front bumper.

== Specifications ==
- Engine: 2.6 litre (2639cc) C-Series I6, 95 hp (71 kW)

== Die-cast models ==
A model of the 6/90 was produced by Lansdowne in 2007.
