= Riley Two-Point-Six =

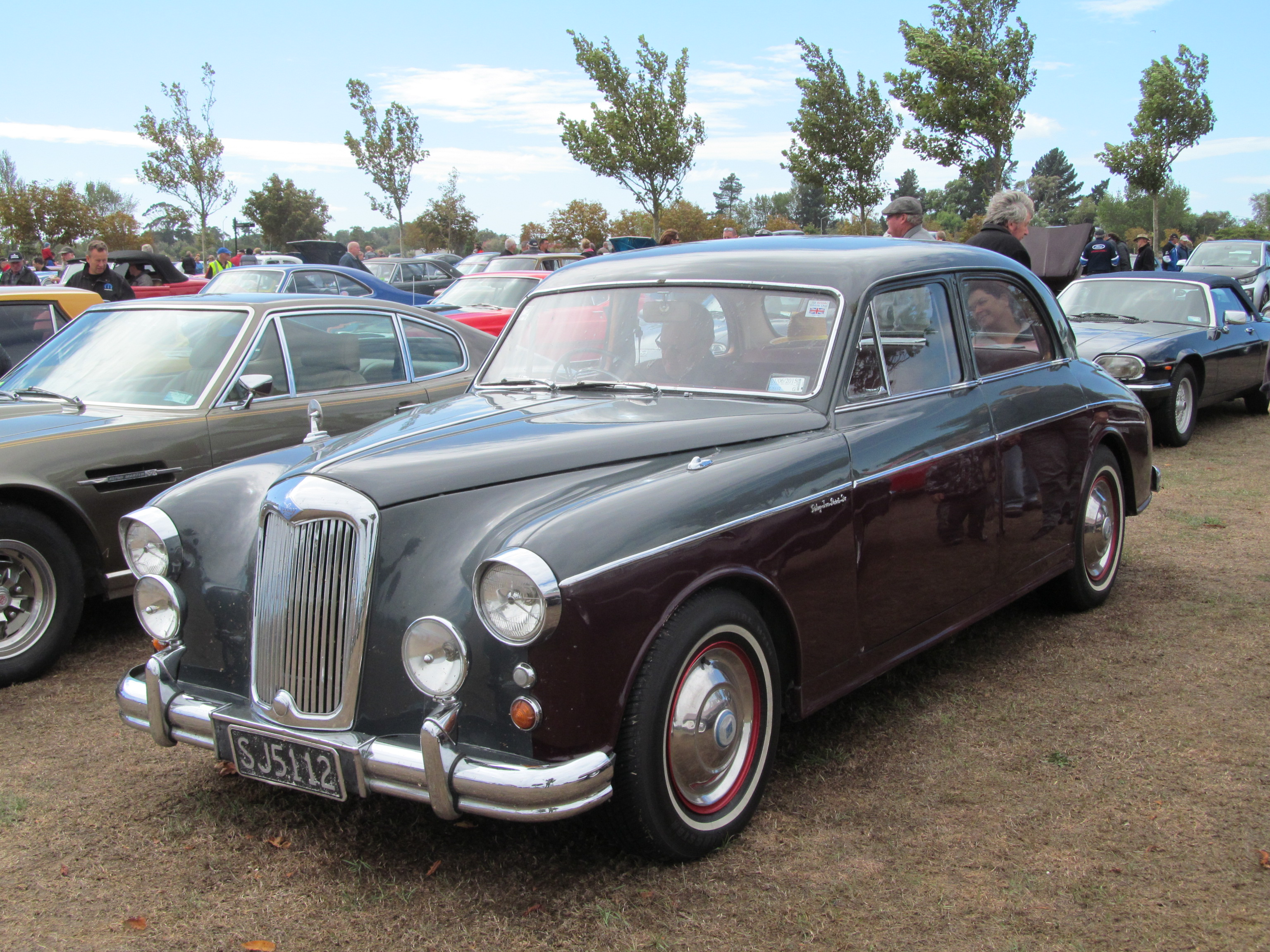

Overview
- Manufacturer: BMC
- Production: 1957–1959

Body and chassis
- Body style: 4-door saloon

Powertrain
- Engine: C.26.R C-Series Straight-6

Dimensions
- Wheelbase: 113 1/2 inches (2,880 mm)
- Length: 185 inches (4,700 mm)

Chronology
- Predecessor: Riley Pathfinder
- Successor: Riley 4/68

The Riley Two-Point-Six is an automobile produced by British Motor Corporation Limited (BMC) from August 1957 until 1959. It replaced the Pathfinder as Riley's flagship model when it was announced on 23 August 1957. While its predecessor retained the renowned Riley four-cylinder twin-cam cross-flow engine, coil rear suspension and gearbox, the Two-Point-Six was virtually identical to the Wolseley Six-Ninety Series III. It featured both monotone and duotone paintwork, as did the last of the Pathfinders. As per the Wolseley Six-Ninety Series III, right hand drive cars with a manual gearbox had a right hand gear lever; LHD cars a left hand gear lever. An automatic transmission and an overdrive for the manual gearbox were available as options.

Externally the most obvious differences from the Pathfinder were the bonnet arrangement – while the Pathfinder's grille lifted with the bonnet, the Two-Point-Six, in common with the 6/90, had a fixed grille – and the wheel arches having a raised edge.

It used the BMC C-Series straight-6, an engine that produced 101 hp (75 kW). This was actually less than the 2½ Litre Riley "Big Four" straight-four engine it replaced. The Two-Point-Six was sold to a specific clientele and was never intended to be mass-produced. It sold at the same pro-rata rate as the previous Riley Pathfinder until the end of production in May 1959. It was the last large Riley, although BMC kept the badge alive in replacing it with the Farina-styled Riley 4/68, similar to the Wolseley 15/60 and MG Magnette.

Engine:

- 2.6 L (2639 cc) C-Series straight-6, 101 hp (75 kW)

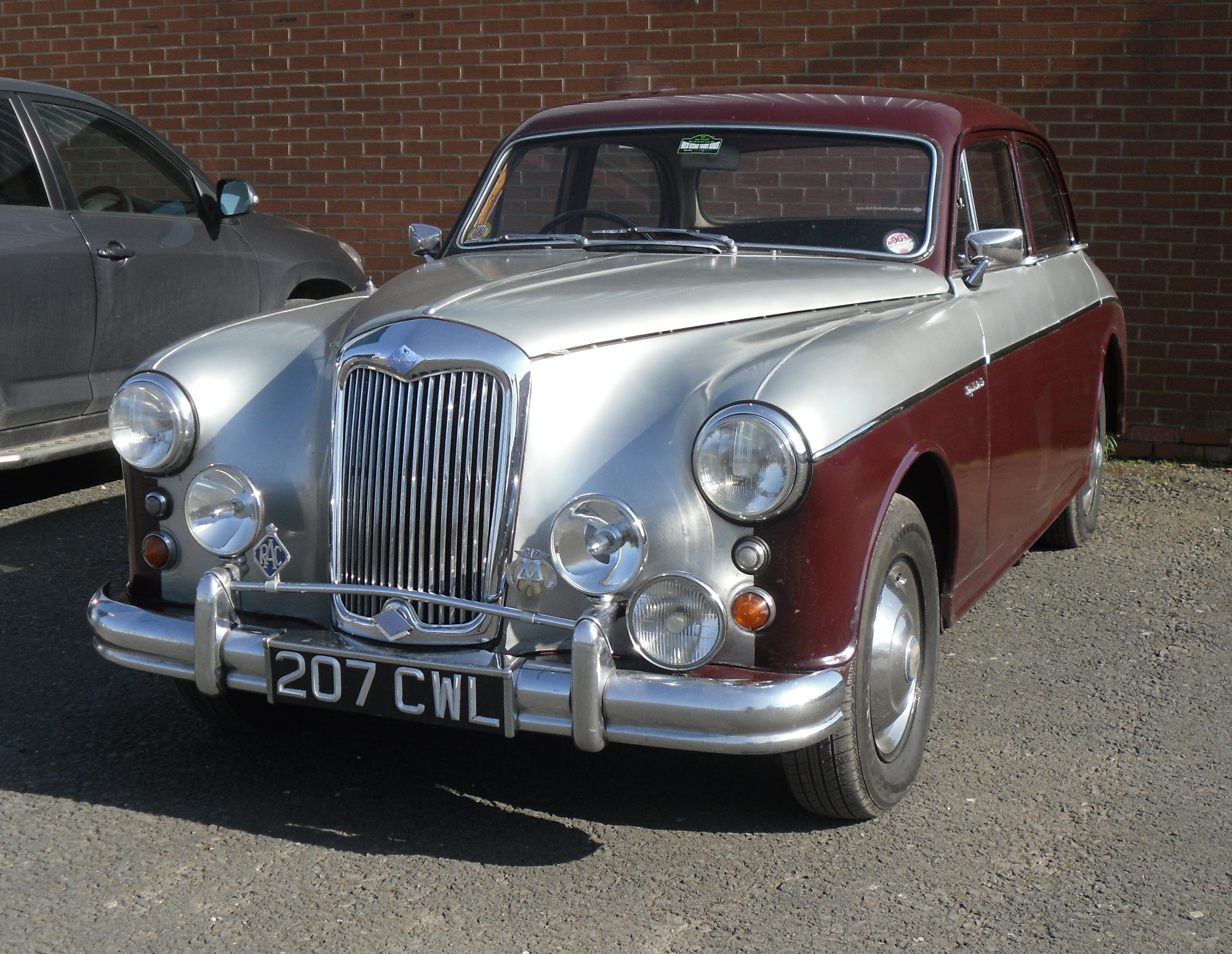
first registered 26 September 1957
