= Riley Pathfinder =

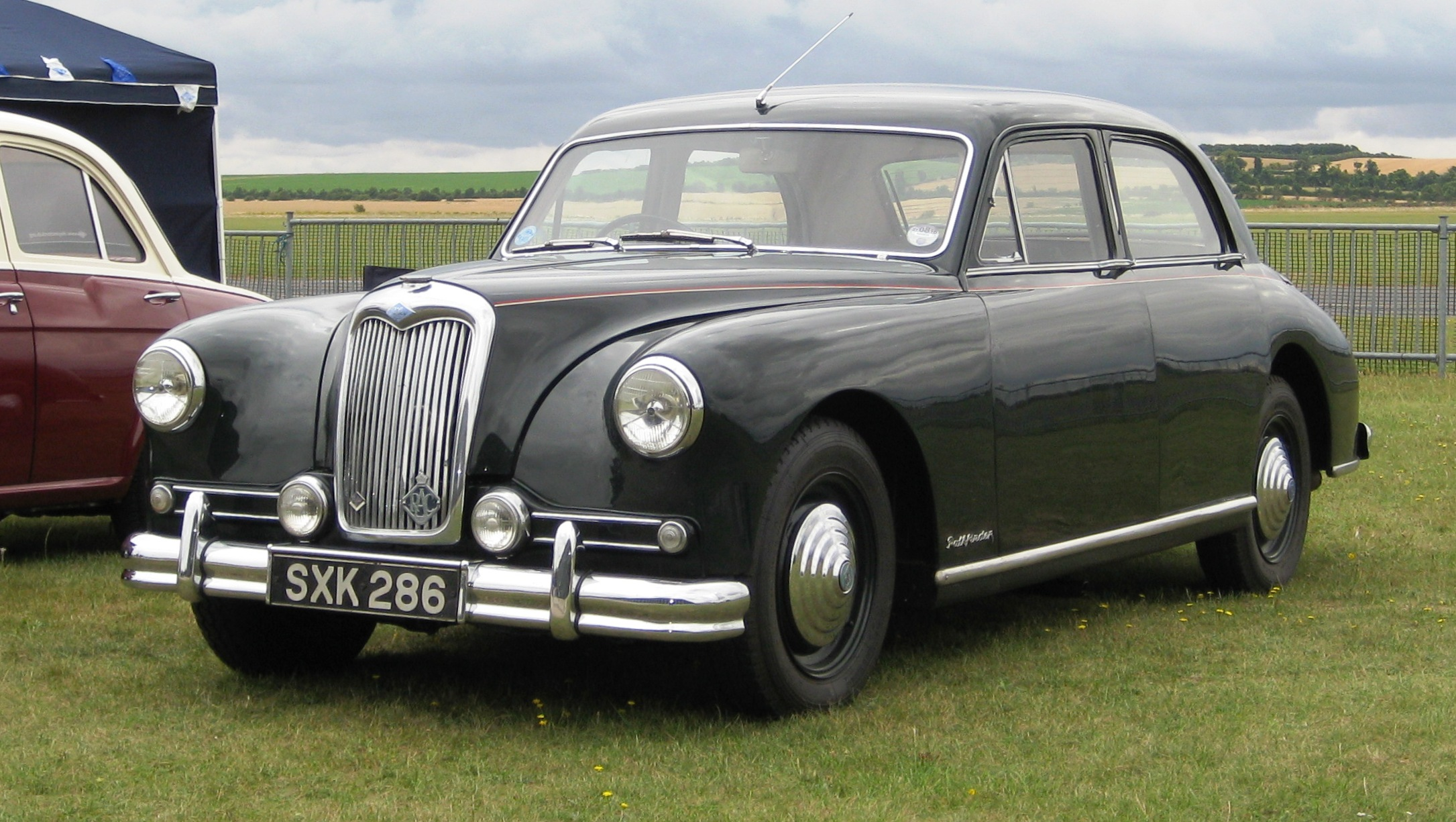
- Riley Pathfinder

Overview
- Manufacturer: Riley Motors Limited
- Production: 1953–1957; 5,536 made
- Designer: Gerald Palmer

Body and chassis
- Class: Full-size car
- Body style: 4-door saloon

Powertrain
- Engine: 2.5-litre, twin-cam Straight-4
- Transmission: 4-speed manual, optional overdrive 3-speed automatic (from 1956)

Dimensions
- Wheelbase: 113.5 in (2,883 mm)
- Length: 183 in (4,648 mm)
- Width: 67 in (1,702 mm)
- Height: 60 in (1,524 mm)

Chronology
- Predecessor: Riley RMF
- Successor: Riley Two-Point-Six

Riley 2½-litre Big Four

Overview
- Manufacturer: Riley Motors Limited
- Production: 1937–1957

Layout
- Configuration: straight four
- Displacement: 2.443 L (149.1 cu in)
- Cylinder bore: 80.5 mm (3.17 in)
- Piston stroke: 120 mm (4.7 in)
- Valvetrain: high-lift camshafts, push-rod operated 90 degree angled overhead valves
- Compression ratio: 6.9 : 1

Combustion
- Fuel system: Twin H4 SU carburettors

Output
- Power output: 106 bhp (79 kW) @ 4,500 rpm Tax rating 16hp

The Riley Pathfinder is an automobile which was produced by Riley Motors Limited in the United Kingdom from 1953 to 1957. It was first presented at the London Motor Show in October 1953 and replaced the RMF as Riley's top-line model.

Designed as the "RMH" just before the 1952 merger of Riley-parent, the Nuffield Organization, with Austin to form BMC, the Pathfinder is seen as the last proper Riley car. It used Riley's 110 bhp (82 kW), 2.5-litre — 2,443 cc (149.1 cu in) — twin-cam, "Big Four" straight-4 engine fitted with twin SU carburettors and had a separate all-steel chassis with coil spring rear (this was changed to leaf springs towards the end of production) and front torsion bar independent suspension. From 1956, an overdrive gearbox became optional. The 12 in (305 mm) Girling drum brakes had a Clayton Dewandre Vac Hydro Servo fitted as standard.

In the front, buyers could choose between two single seats and the optional full width bench seat, with the front corner of the seat squab contoured so as to accommodate the gear lever and allow seating for three. The rear seat had a fold down centre armrest and leather covers were used. A heater was fitted as standard. The car was available in black, maroon, green, blue or grey finish. The gear lever was floor mounted by the driver's door, so drivers in right hand drive markets had to change gear with their right hand. The handbrake was operated by a lever under the dashboard in both bench and individual front seat versions.

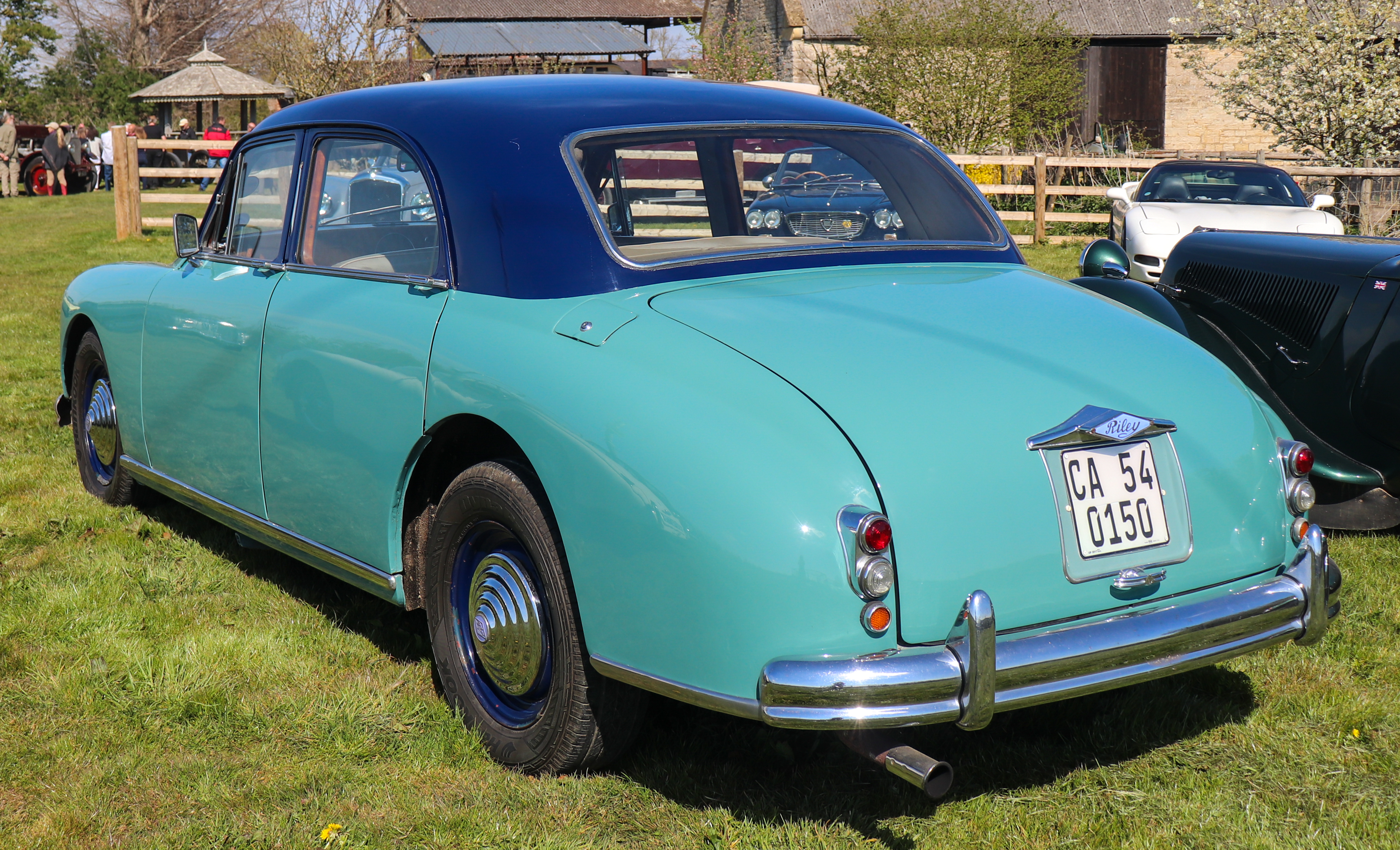
Rear shot

The body was similar in appearance to the Wolseley 6/90, although there were detail differences such as the Riley's opening bonnet including the radiator grille, whereas the Wolseley's grille was fixed. The Riley was launched in 1953 and the Wolseley in 1954, and both were designed by Morris' Gerald Palmer for the Nuffield Organization before the merger. All Pathfinders featured the front independent suspension developed from the RMF, but the sophisticated Riley rear suspension was replaced by a conventional leaf spring type in the last few examples. An essential part of the location of the rear axle was a Panhard rod which on some early examples sheared on hard cornering resulting in the unfortunate 'Ditchfinder' nickname.

A car tested by The Motor magazine in 1955 had a top speed of 99.5 mph (160.1 km/h) and could accelerate from 0-60 mph (97 km/h) in 16.8 seconds. A fuel consumption of 19.5 miles per imperial gallon (14.5 L/100 km; 16.2 mpg_{‑US}) was recorded. The test car cost £1240 including taxes.

The Pathfinder was replaced by the short-lived Wolseley 6/90-derived Riley Two-Point-Six in 1957.

== Die-cast models ==
- Corgi No. 205 (production 1956–61), Riley Pathfinder, approximately O scale (1:44).
- Corgi No. 205M (production 1956–59) Riley Pathfinder, approximately O-scale (1:44) with friction drive.
- Corgi No. 209 (production 1958–61), Riley Pathfinder Police car, approximately O-scale (1:44).
- Base Toys produced a 00 scale model of the Riley Pathfinder
