= MG WA =

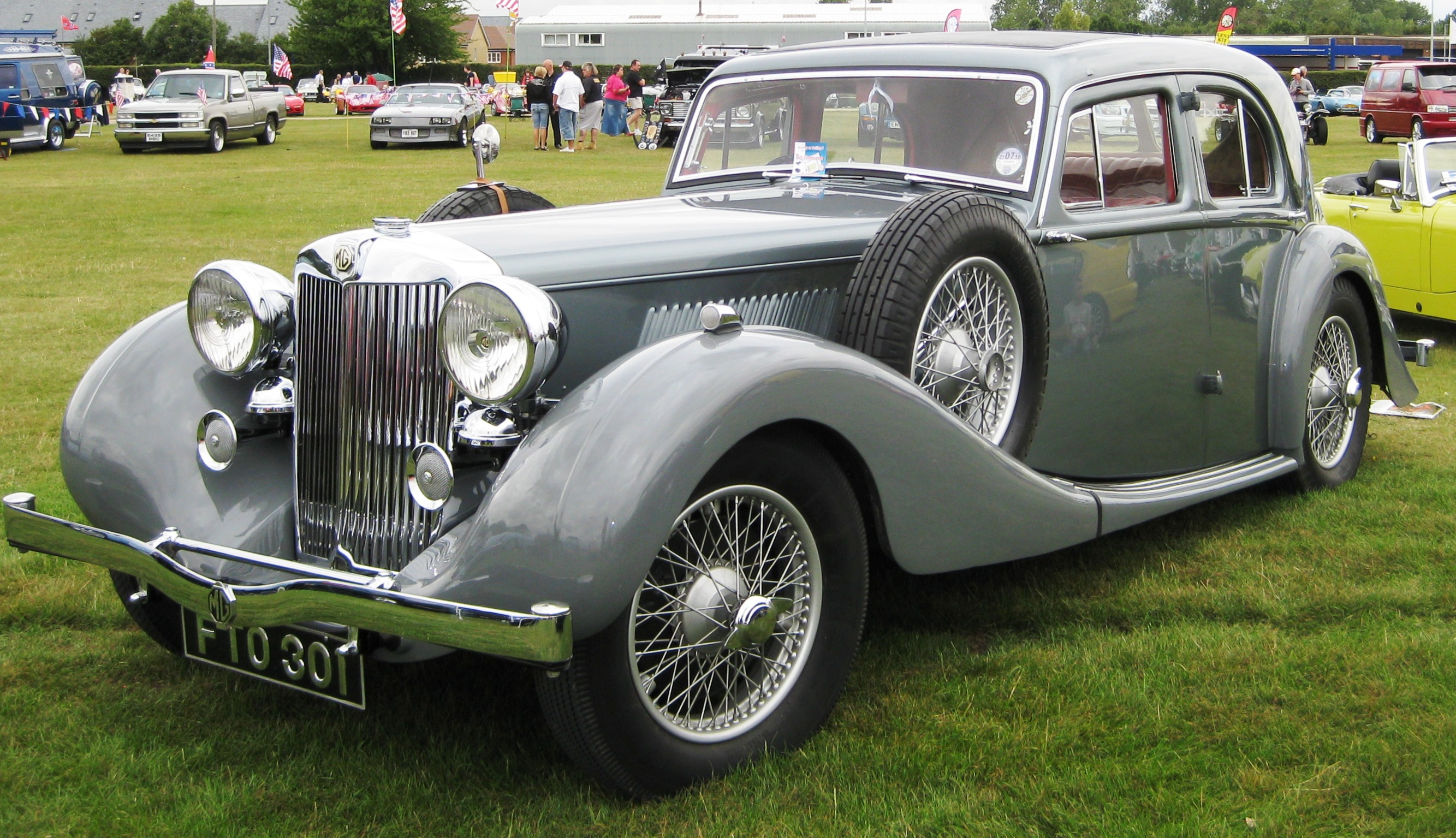
- 2.6-litre six-cylinder 4-door sports saloon

Overview
- Manufacturer: MG (Morris)
- Production: 1938–1939
- Assembly: Abingdon-on-Thames, Berkshire, England

Body and chassis
- Body style: 4-door saloon; 4-door, 4-seat tourer; 2-door drophead coupé

Powertrain
- Engine: 2561 cc I6

Dimensions
- Wheelbase: 123 inches (3124 mm)
- Length: 194 inches (4928 mm)
- Width: 67 inches (1702 mm)

Chronology
- Predecessor: MG SA saloon

The MG WA is a sporting saloon that was produced by MG between 1938 and 1939 and was at the time the largest and heaviest car the company had built. Although similar to the SA the car had a wider track at the rear allowing a larger body to be fitted.

The car used a tuned version of the six-cylinder Morris QPHG engine enlarged to 2561 cc. The compression ratio was increased to 7.25 to 1 and a new balanced crankshaft was fitted. Drive was to the live rear axle via a four-speed manual gearbox with synchromesh on the top three ratios and a divided propshaft. Wire wheels were fitted and the 14 inch drum brakes were hydraulically operated using a Lockheed system.

The saloon body was made in-house by Morris and was a spacious four-door with traditional MG grille flanked by two large chrome plated headlights. It can be distinguished from the outwardly similar SA by the front bumper which has a dip in the centre and the spare wheel was carried on the front wing as opposed to the boot lid. Inside there were individual seats in front and a bench seat with folding centre arm rest at the rear, all with leather covering and a return was made to the traditional octagonal framed instruments.

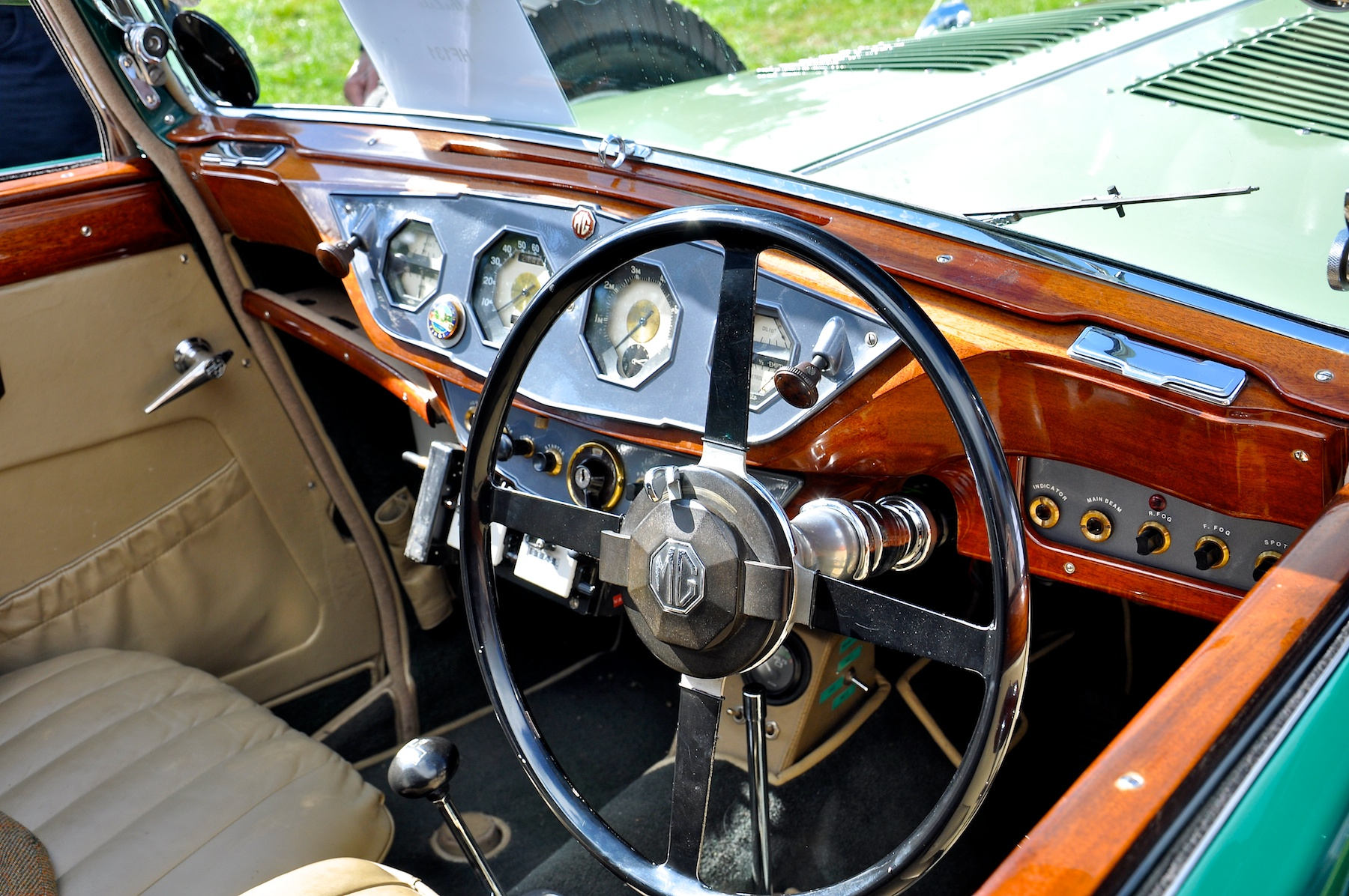
Traditional octagonal instruments

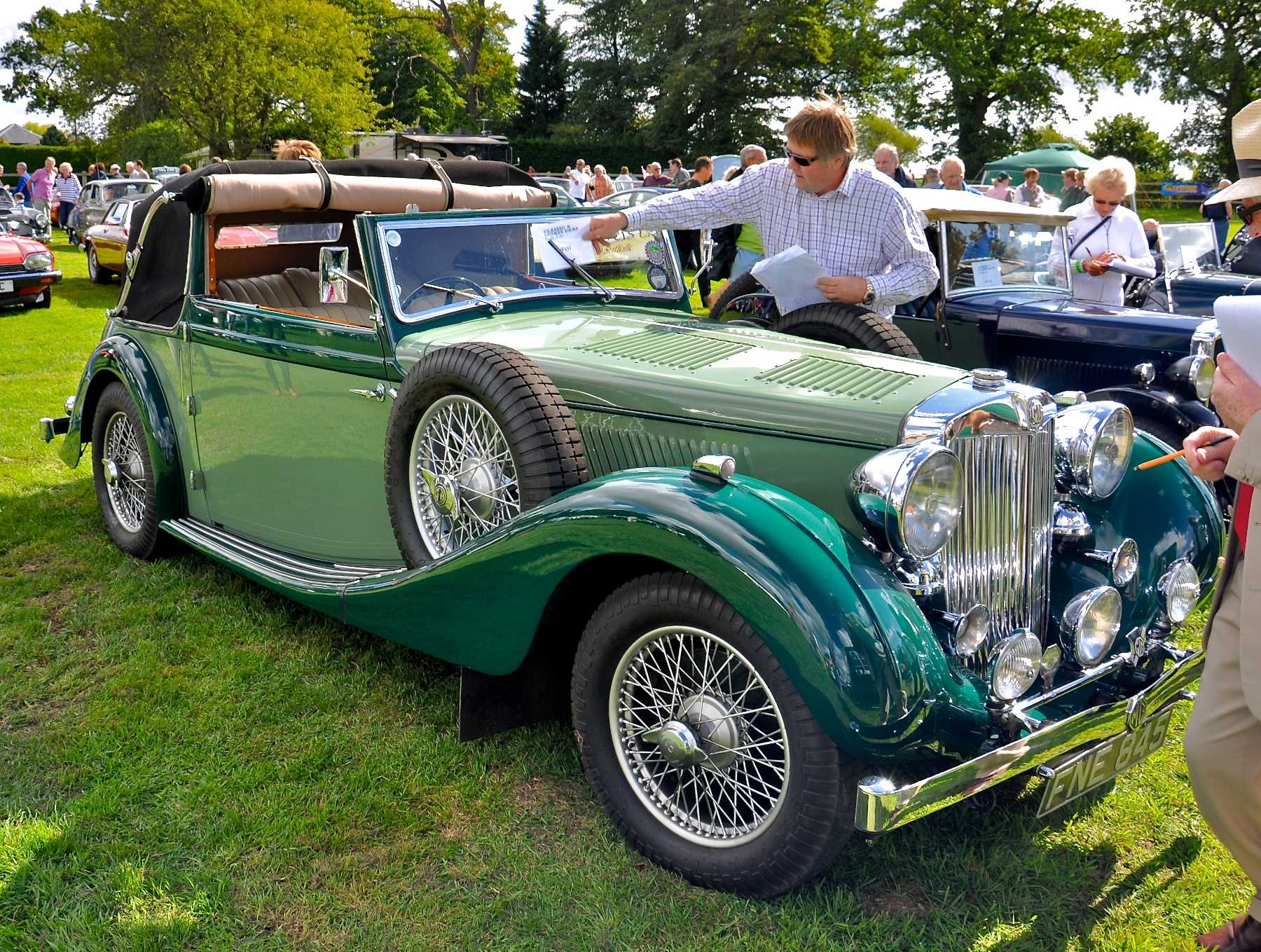
Two-door Tickford
drop-head coupé
Quarter view

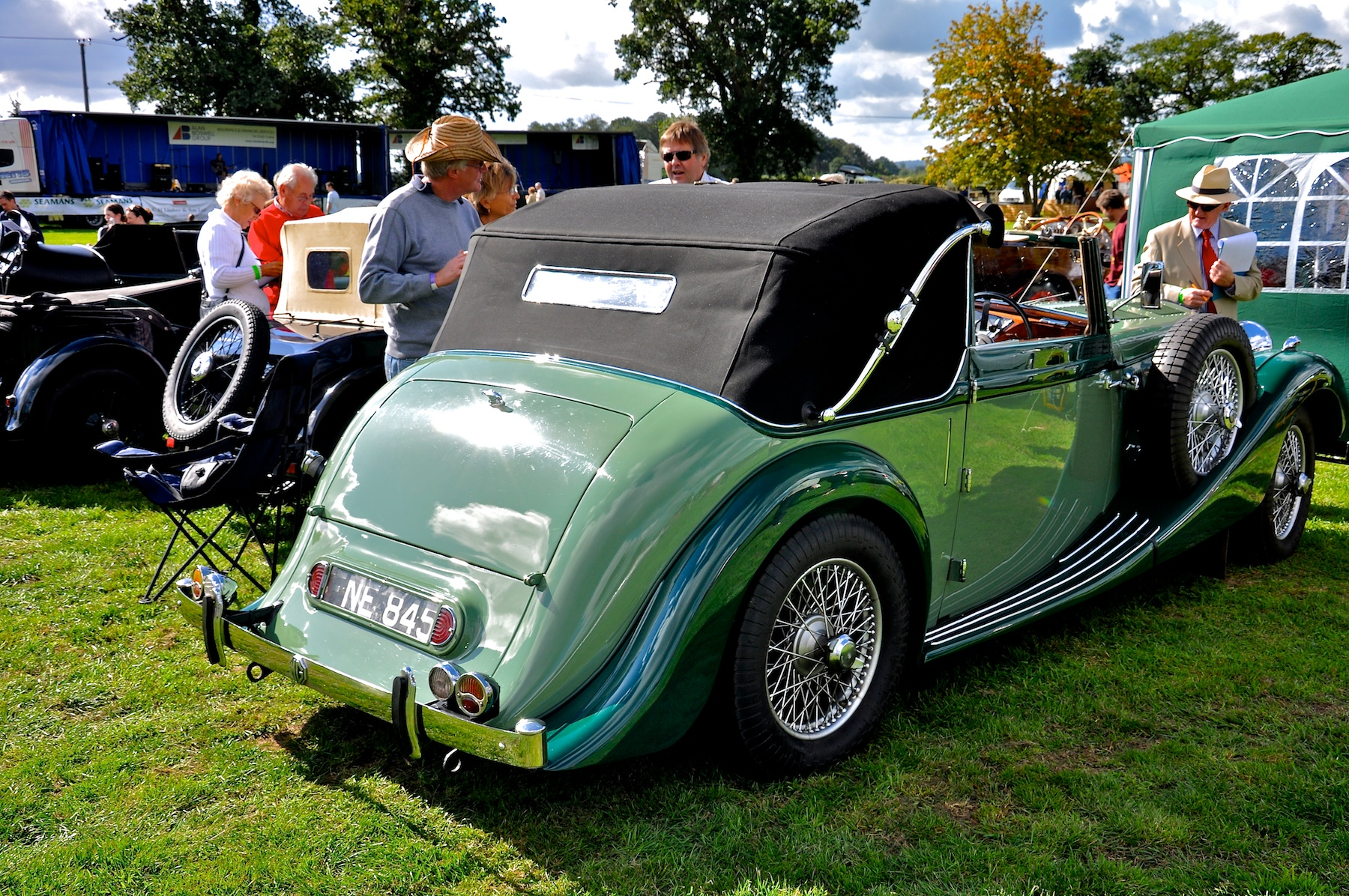
Two-door Tickford
drop-head coupé
Threequarter view

The factory could also supply the car from their catalogue as a Tickford drophead coupé built by Salmons and Son or four-door tourer by Charlesworth and some chassis went to other coachbuilders including Kellner of Paris and Reinbolt of Switzerland. The saloon was priced at GBP442, the four-seat tourer GBP450 and the Tickford coupé GBP468.

Production stopped with the outbreak of World War II in 1939 and the car was not re-introduced in 1945.
