= MG SA =

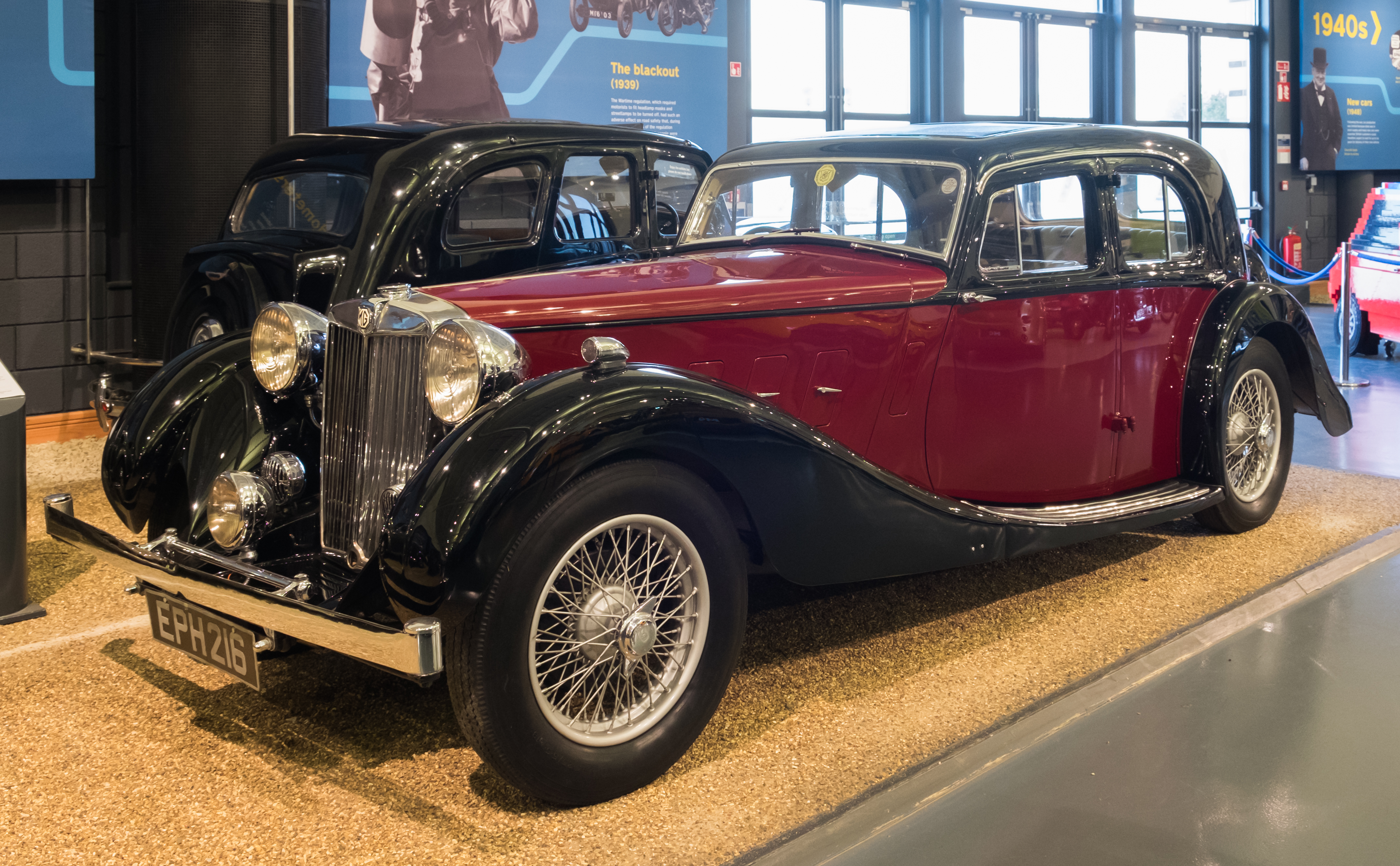
- 2.3-litre six-cylinder 4-door 4-seater sports saloon

Overview
- Manufacturer: MG (Morris)
- Production: 1936–1939
- Assembly: Abingdon-on-Thames, Berkshire, England

Body and chassis
- Body style: 4 door saloon 4 seat tourer drophead coupé

Powertrain
- Engine: 2,288 cc (139.6 cu in) or 2,322 cc (141.7 cu in) Straight-6

Dimensions
- Wheelbase: 123 in (3,100 mm)
- Length: 193 in (4,900 mm)
- Width: 66.5 in (1,690 mm)

Chronology
- Predecessor: MG KN saloon
- Successor: MG WA

The MG SA or MG 2-litre is a sporting saloon that was produced by MG from 1936 to 1939. Launched as the 2-litre, it only later became known as the SA, the car had been originally planned as an advanced performance saloon to rival the likes of SS Cars (later to be known as Jaguar) and even Bentley with all independent suspension and was given the factory code of EX150 and designated the S-type. A prototype was made but with the amalgamation of MG with Morris Motors in 1935, development stopped. The Cowley drawing office picked up the project again but a much more conservative car appeared with conventional live rear and beam front axles.

The car used a tuned version of the six-cylinder 2,062 cc (125.8 cu in) Morris QPHG engine which it shared with the Wolseley Super Six but enlarged to 2,288 cc (139.6 cu in). The capacity was increased again to 2,322 cc (141.7 cu in) in 1937 bringing it into line with the Wolseley 18. This was a tall engine and to allow the bonnet line to be as low as possible the twin SU carburettors had their dashpots mounted horizontally. Drive was to the live rear axle via a four-speed manual gearbox with synchromesh on the top two ratios (on all but a few early models). Wire wheels were fitted and the drum brakes were hydraulically operated using a Lockheed system. A built in Jackall jacking system was fitted to the chassis.

The saloon body, the only option available at the time of the car's launch, was made in-house by Morris and was a spacious four door with traditional MG grille flanked by two large chrome plated headlights. The spare wheel was carried on the boot lid. Inside there were individual seats in front and a bench seat at the rear, all with leather covering. Much use was made of walnut for the dashboard and other trim items. A Philco radio was offered as an optional extra for 18 Guineas (GBP18.90).

== Wider range of body styles ==
From April 1936, a Tickford drophead coupé by Salmons joined the range priced at GBP398, the saloon was GBP375, and in July, coachbuilders Charlesworth offered a four-door tourer at GBP375. The tourer originally had straight topped doors but these were replaced with front ones with cutaway tops from 1938 and at the same time the spare wheel moved to the front wing.

Of the 2,739 cars made, 350 were exported with Germany proving the best market. At the 1938 London Motor show, alongside an SA there was a new 2.6-litre car, the WA. This was probably designed to be a replacement but both cars ran in parallel until the outbreak of war in 1939 caused production of both to cease. Neither was re-introduced in 1945.

== Gallery ==
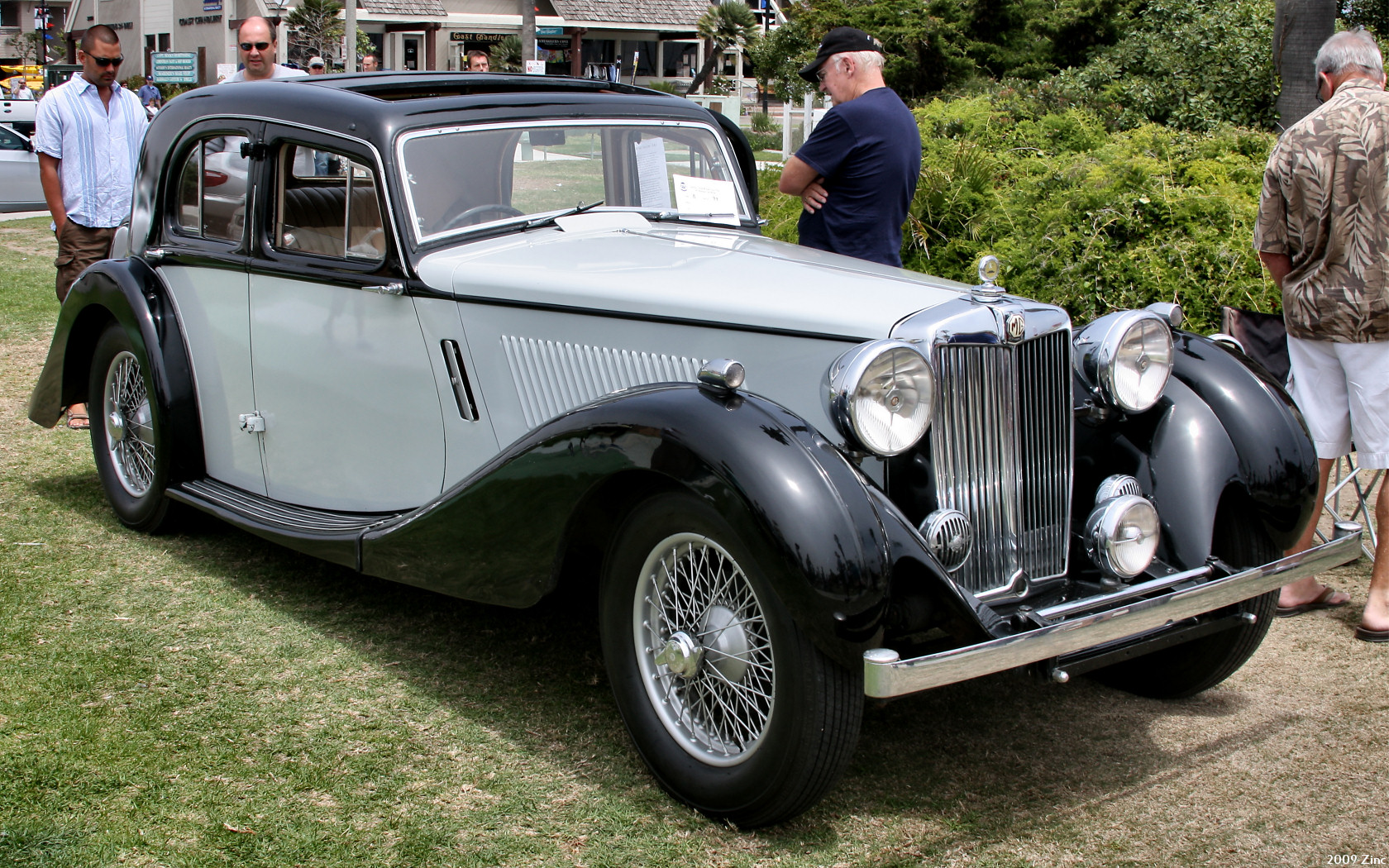
Standard
4-door sports saloon 1938

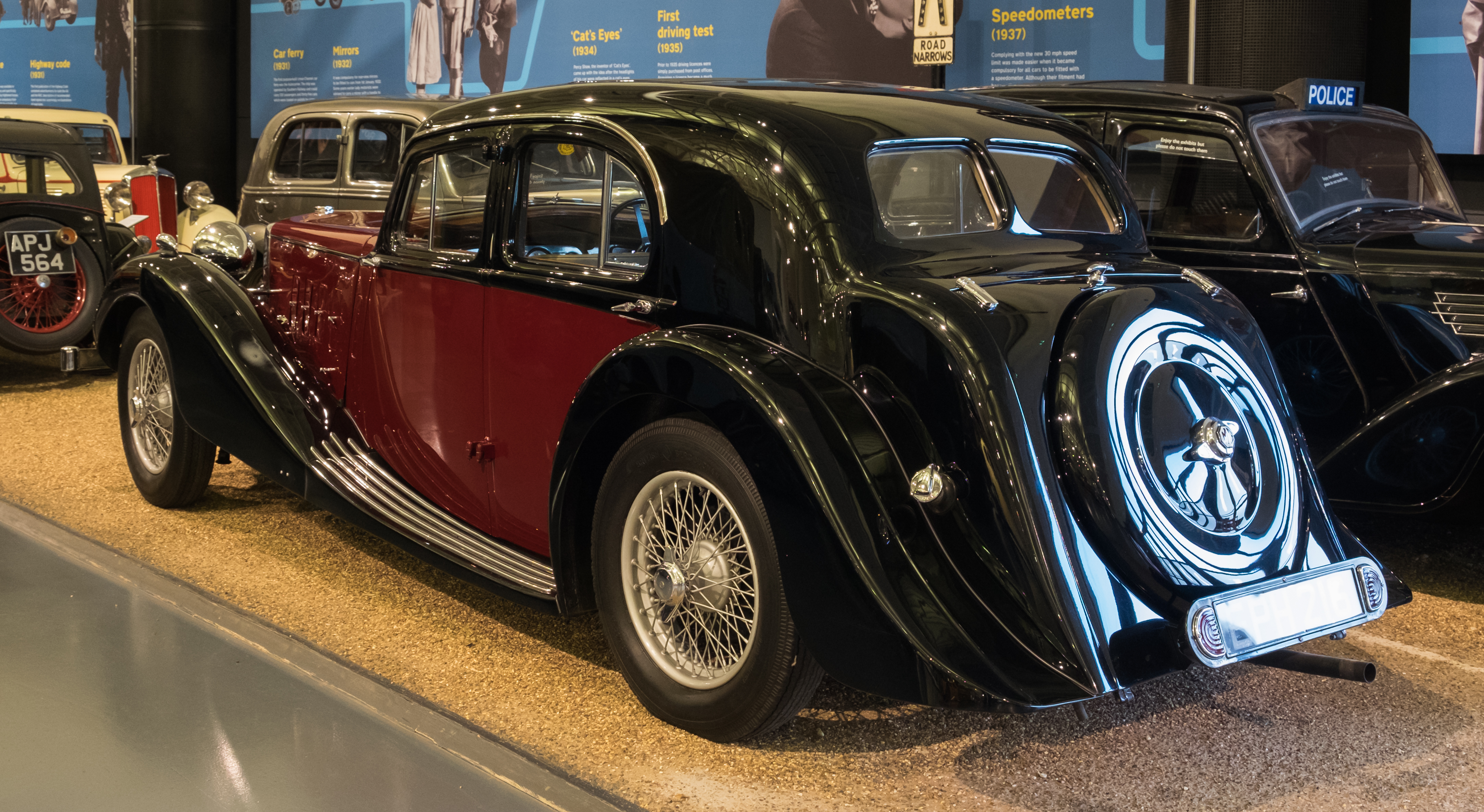

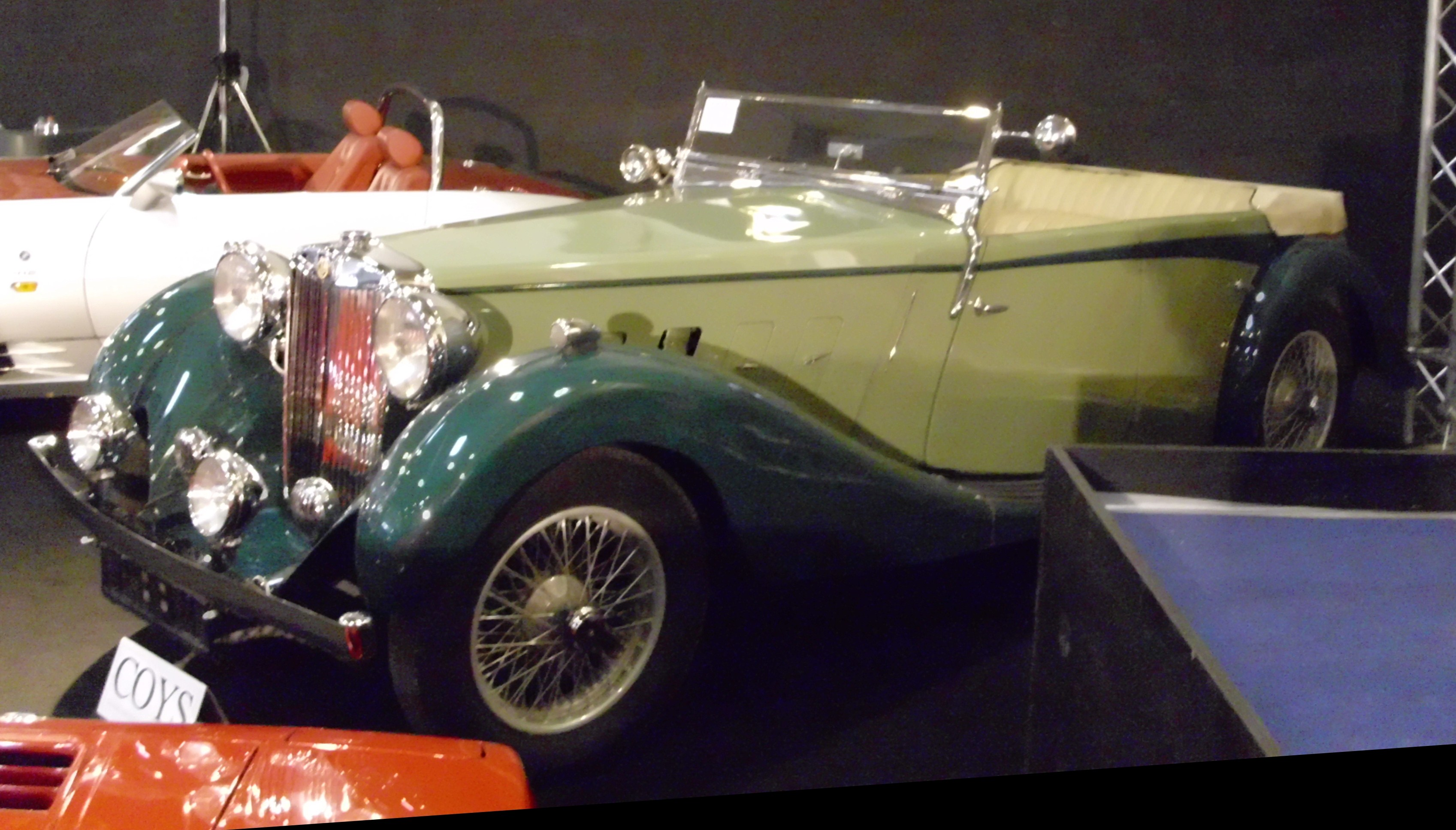
Charlesworth
4-door tourer 1936

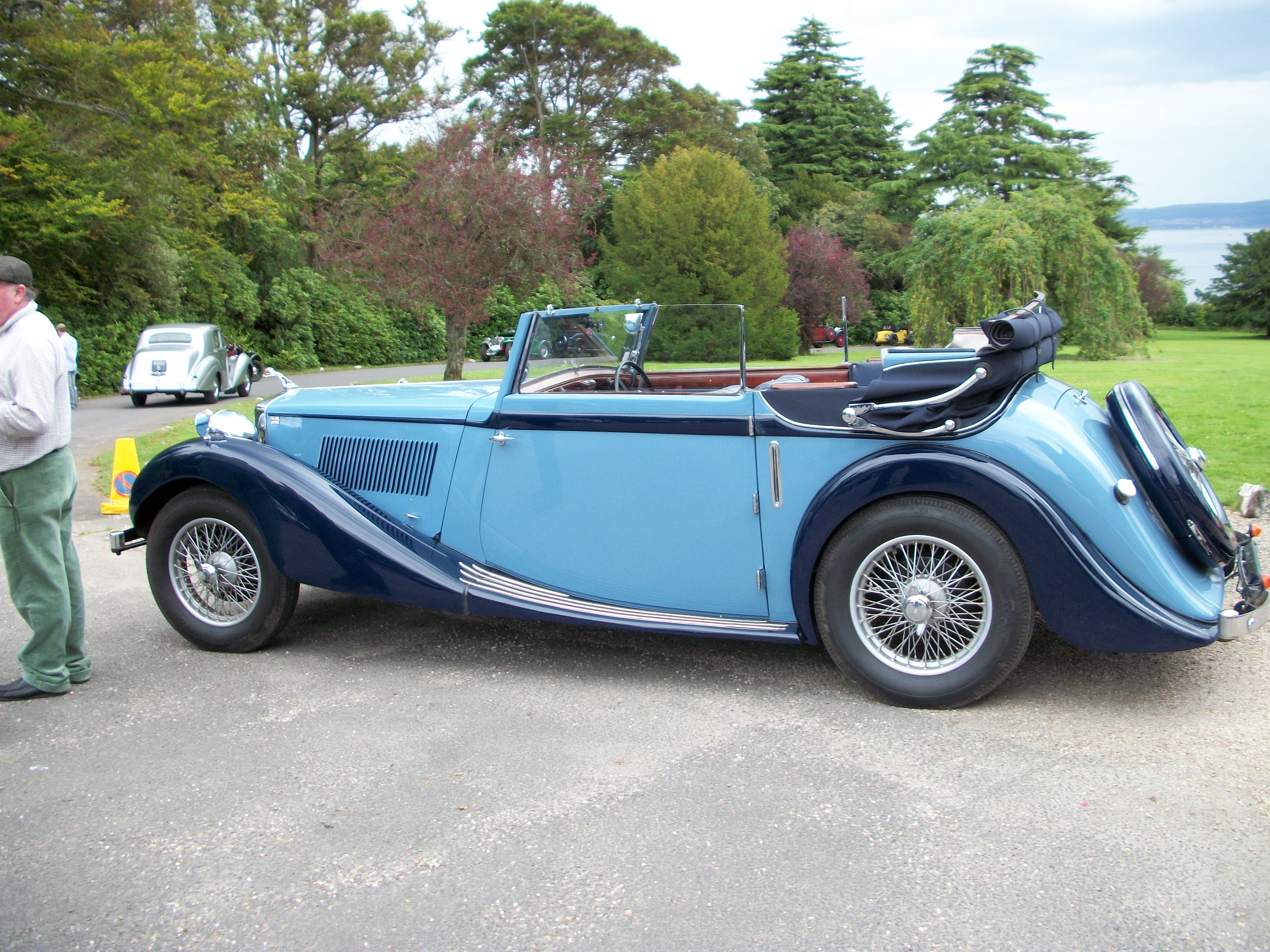
Tickford
drop-head coupé 1938
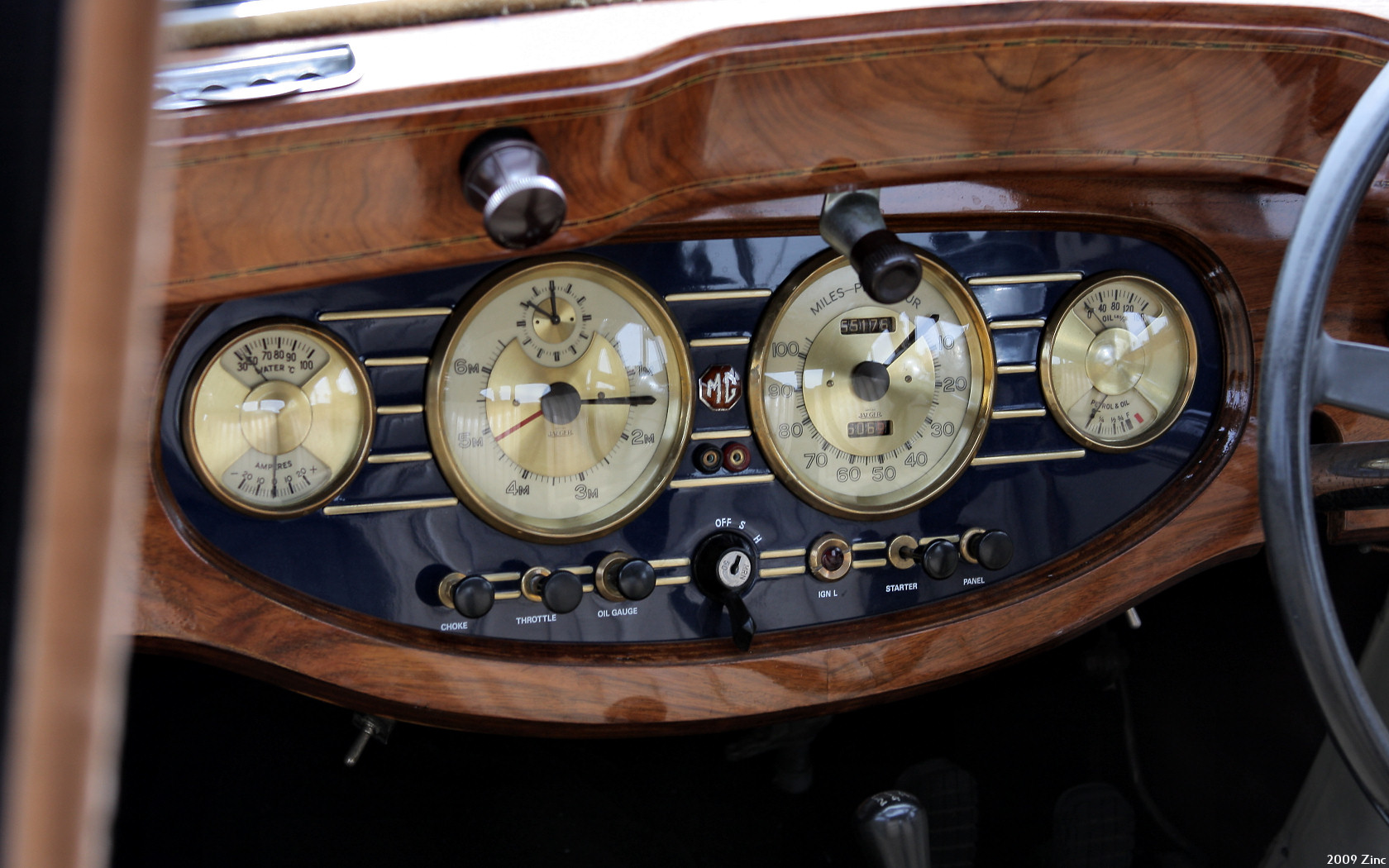

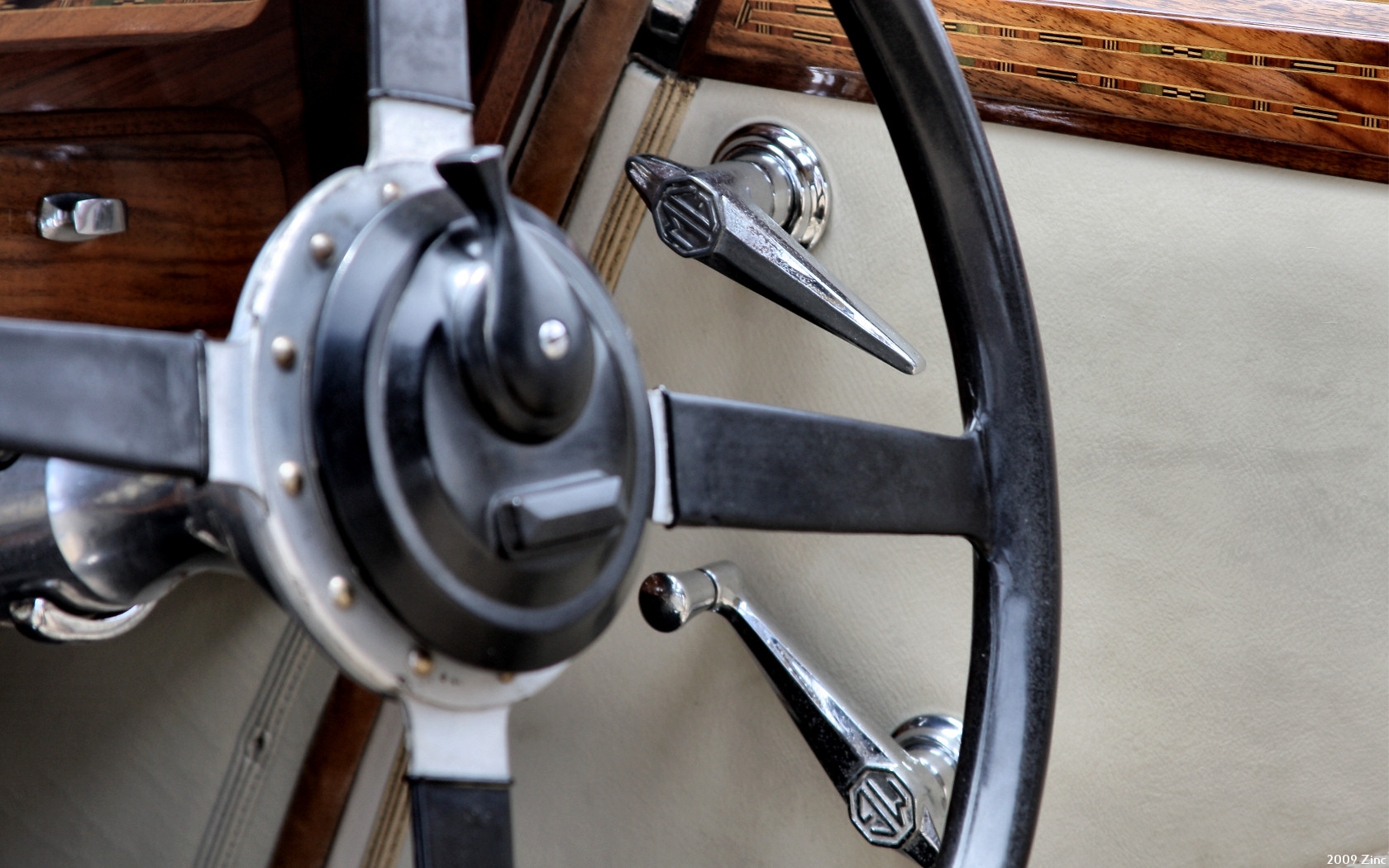

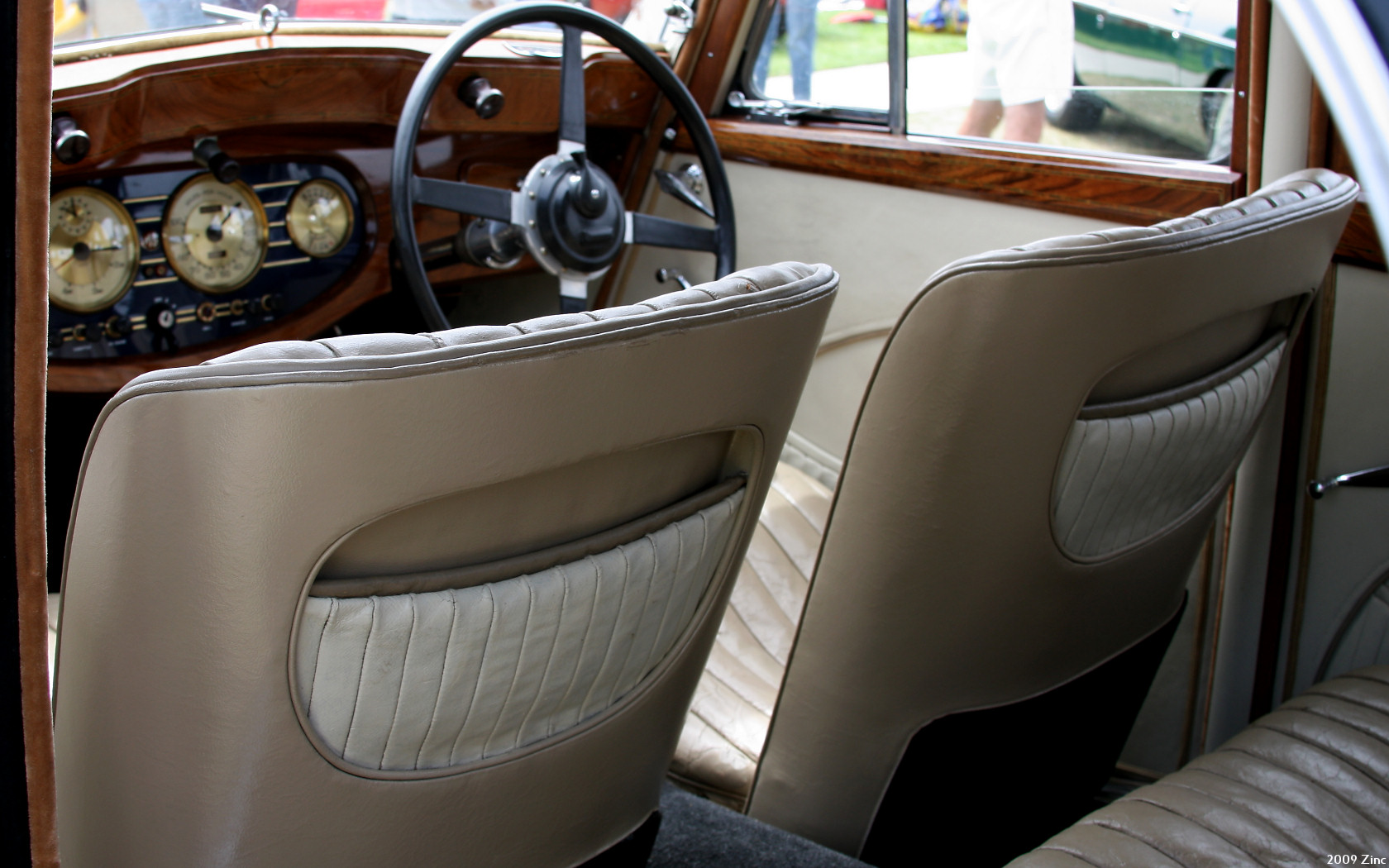

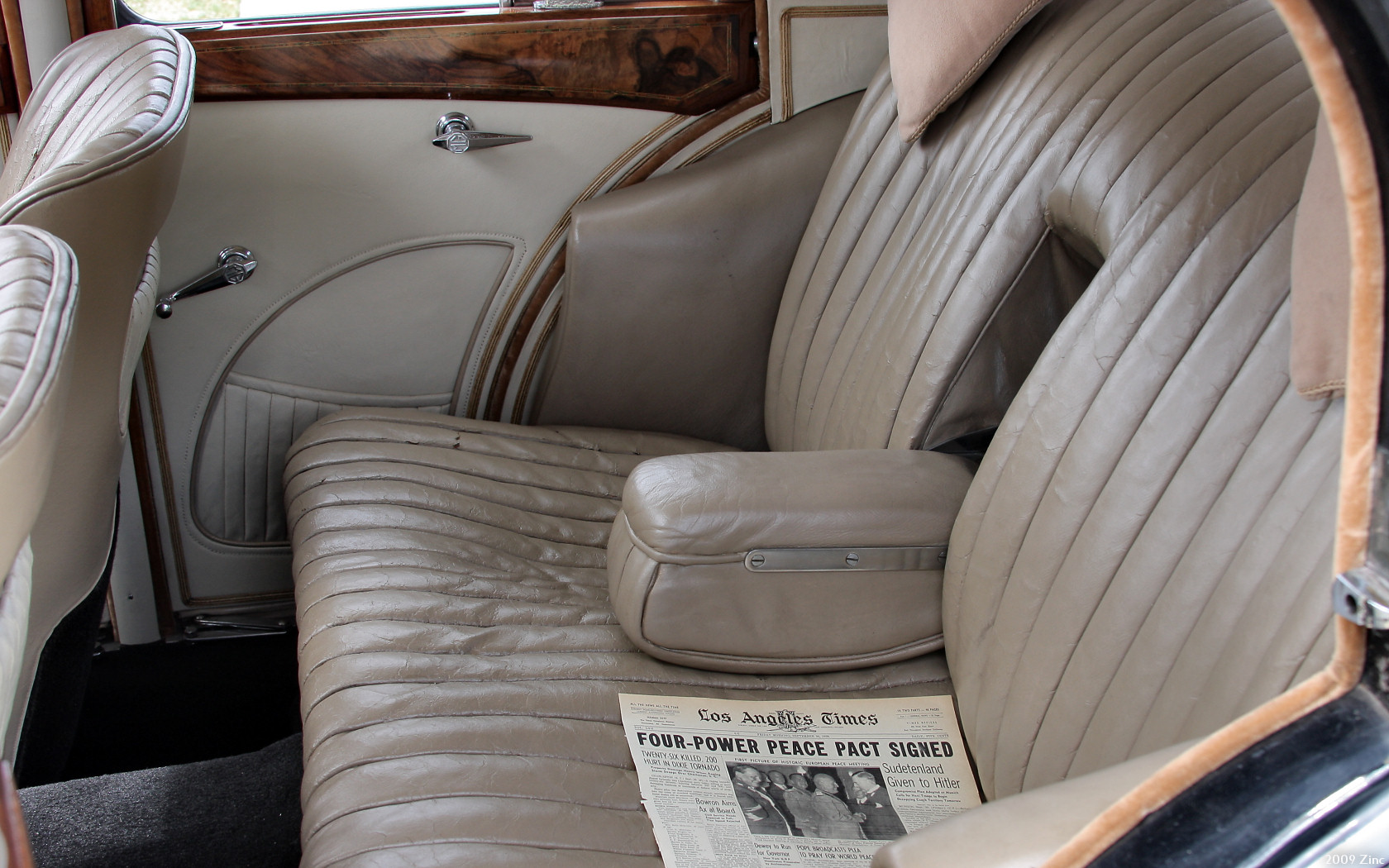

== Culture ==
In the Alfred Hitchcock movie "Rebecca" (1940) a 1937 MG SA Tourer Charlesworth is driven by "Maxim" de Winter (Laurence Olivier), in South of France/Monte Carlo, on his first arrival with (the Second) Mrs. de Winter (Joan Fontaine) to Manderley (the de Winter estate), and on his ride from the coroner's inquest to London and Manderley.
