= List of Wolseley automobiles =

This is a list of automobiles and related vehicles marketed under the Wolseley, Wolseley-Siddeley and Stellite names.

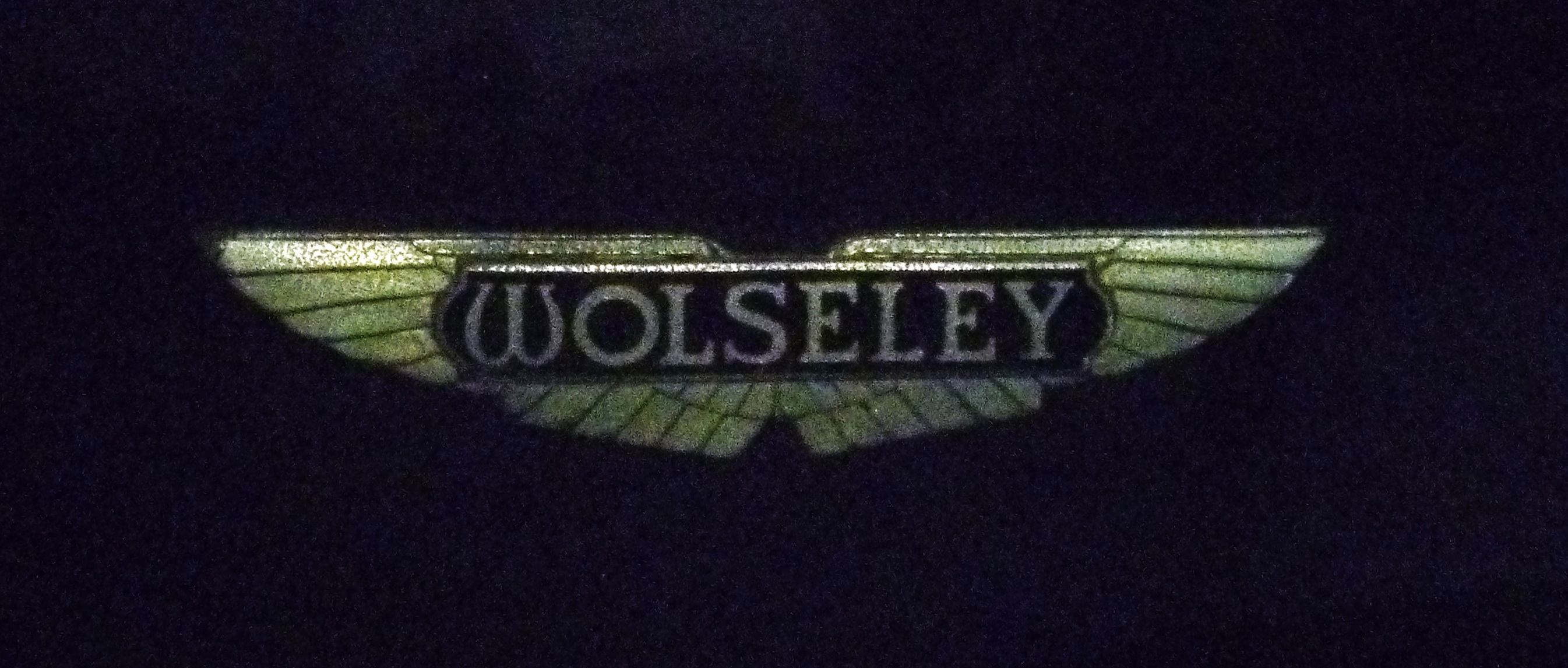

== Herbert Austin's cars with horizontal engines ==
These early designs were by Austin, founder of this business for Vickers. Austin left Wolseley in 1905 and founded his own Austin business. source

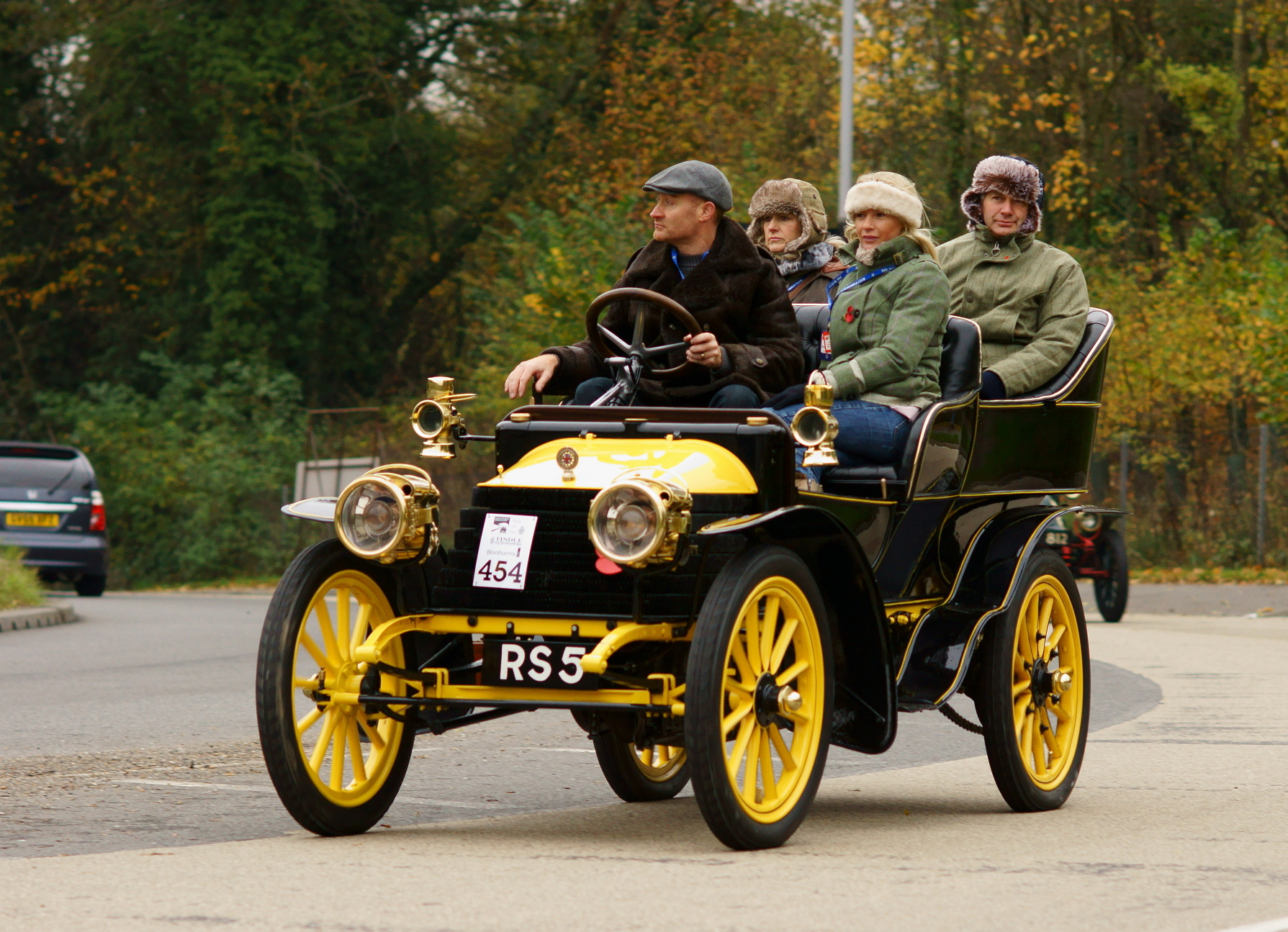
1903 Wolseley 10hp

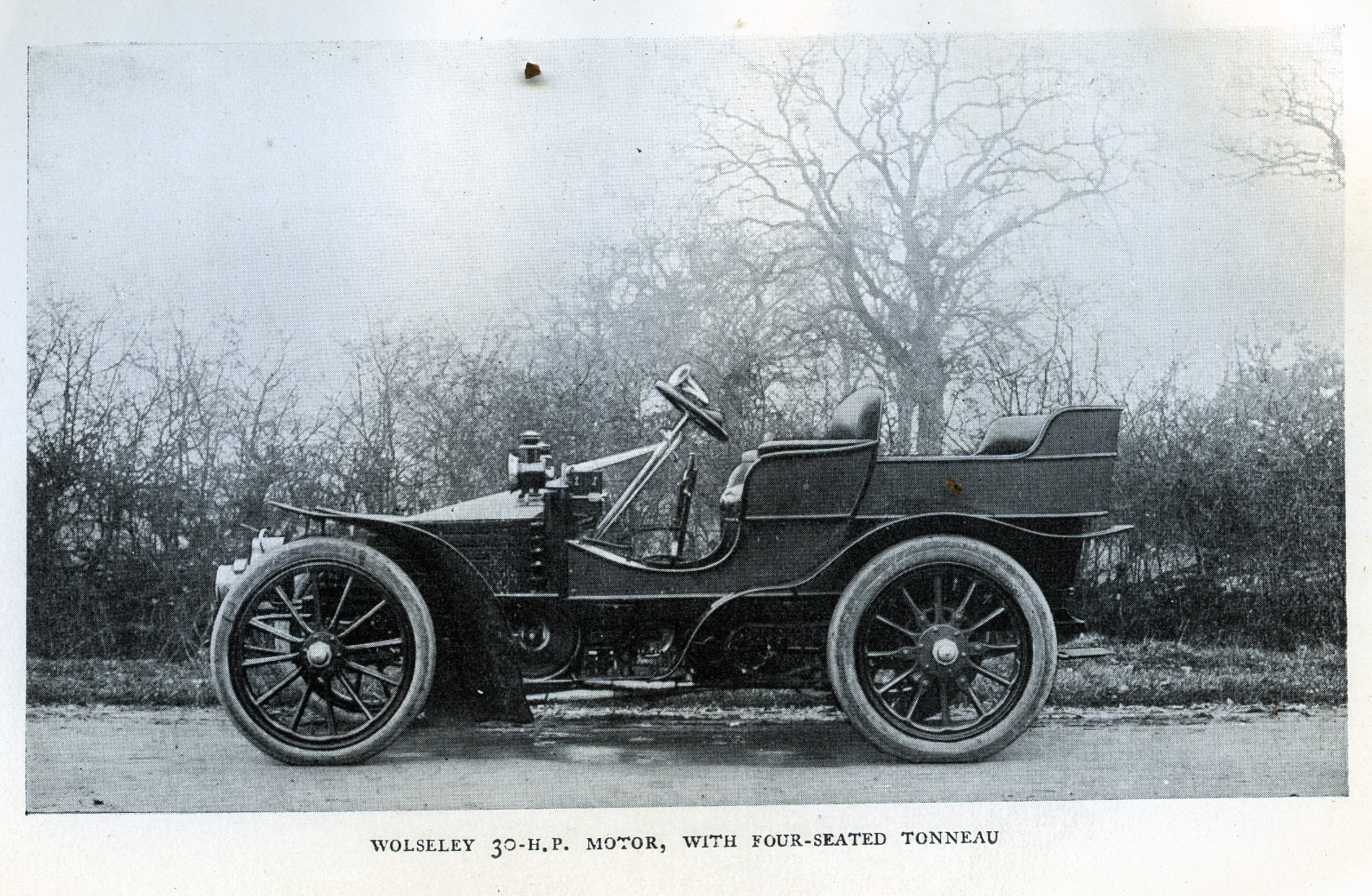
1903 Wolseley 20hp

| class | from | to | name | model | tax HP | disp. | cyl. | bore | stroke | ignition | gearbox speeds | final drive |
|---|---|---|---|---|---|---|---|---|---|---|---|---|
| racing | 1901 | 1901 | Racing | 20 | 32.4 | 5213 | 4 H | 114.3 | 127 | coil | 5 | chain |
| | 1902 | 1902 | Racing | 30 | 40.0 | 5213 | 4 H | 114.3 | 127 | coil | 4 | chain |
| | 1903 | 1903 | Racing | 50 | 57.6 | 12047 | 4 H | 152.4 | 165 | coil | 4 | chain |

| class | from | to | name | model | tax HP | disp. | cyl. | bore | stroke | ignition | gearbox speeds | final drive |
|---|---|---|---|---|---|---|---|---|---|---|---|---|
| single-cylinder | 1900 | 1900 | Wolseley | 4½ | 8.1 | 1303 | 1 H | 114.3 | 127 | coil | 3 | chain |
| | 1901 | 1903 | Wolseley | 5 | 8.1 | 1303 | 1 H | 114.3 | 127 | coil | 3 | chain |
| | 1904 | 1906 | Wolseley | 6 | 8.1 | 1303 | 1 H | 114.3 | 127 | coil | 4 | chain to live axle |
| two-cylinder | 1902 | | Wolseley | 7½ | 12.8 | 1647 | 2 H | 101.6 | 102 | coil | 3 | chain |
| | 1904 | 1906 | Wolseley | 8 | 12.8 | 1647 | 2 H | 101.6 | 102 | coil | 3 | chain |
| | 1903 | | Wolseley | 7½ | 16.2 | 2606 | 2 H | 114.3 | 127 | coil | 3 | chain |
| | 1901 | 1903 | Wolseley | 10 | 16.2 | 2606 | 2 H | 114.3 | 127 | coil | 4 | chain |
| | 1904 | 1906 | Wolseley | 12 | 16.2 | 2606 | 2 H | 114.3 | 127 | coil | 4 | chain |
| four-cylinder | 1904 | | Wolseley | 16 | 25.6 | 3295 | 4 H | 101.6 | 102 | coil | 4 | chain |
| | 1902 | | Wolseley | 20 | 32.4 | 5213 | 4 H | 114.3 | 127 | coil | 4 | chain |
| | 1903 | | Wolseley | 20 | 32.4 | 5213 | 4 H | 114.3 | 127 | coil | 4 | chain |
| | 1904 | | Wolseley | 24 | 32.4 | 5213 | 4 H | 114.3 | 127 | coil | 4 | chain |

== Siddeley's and other Wolseley cars to 1915 ==
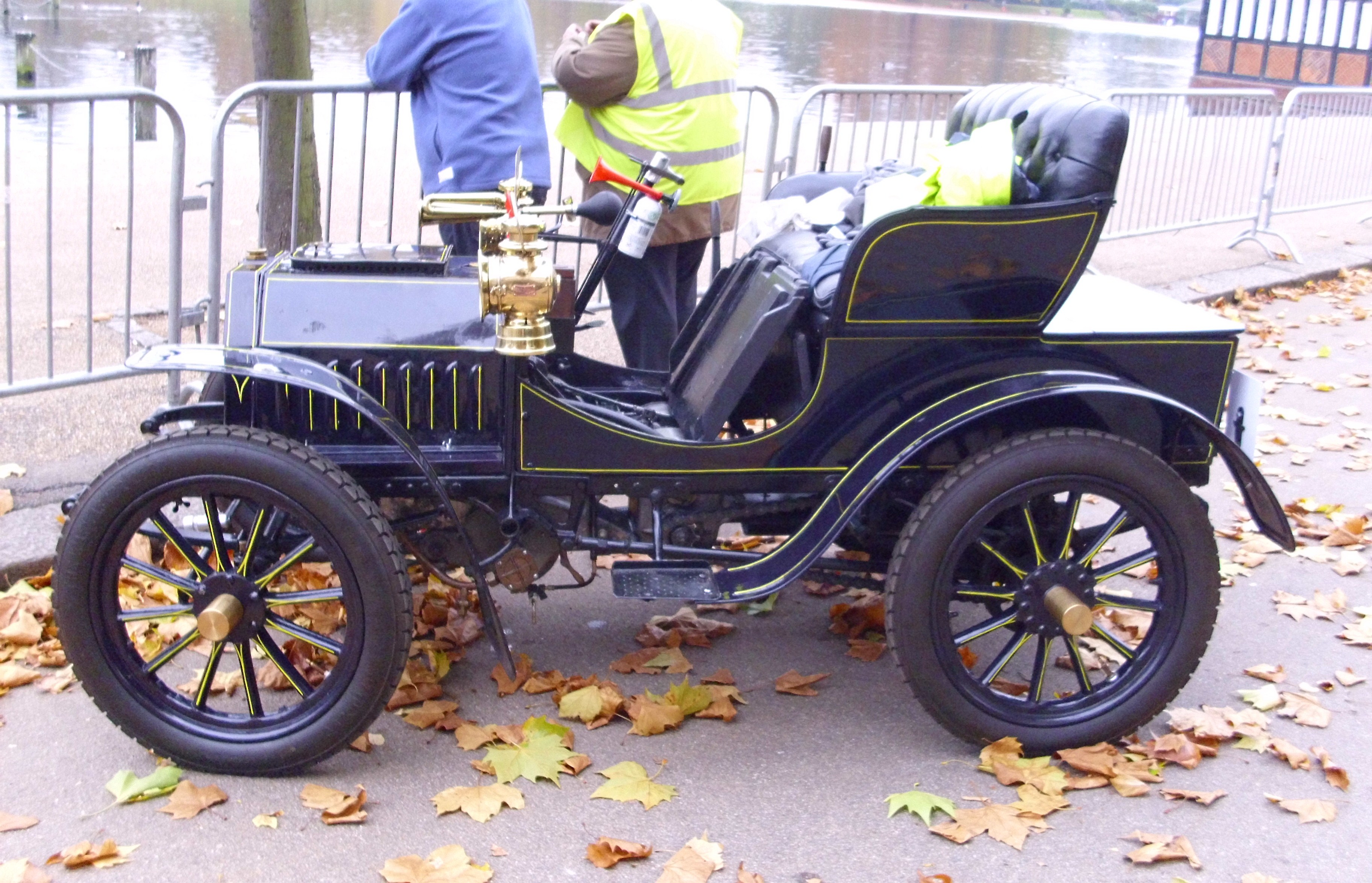
1904 Siddeley 2-seater

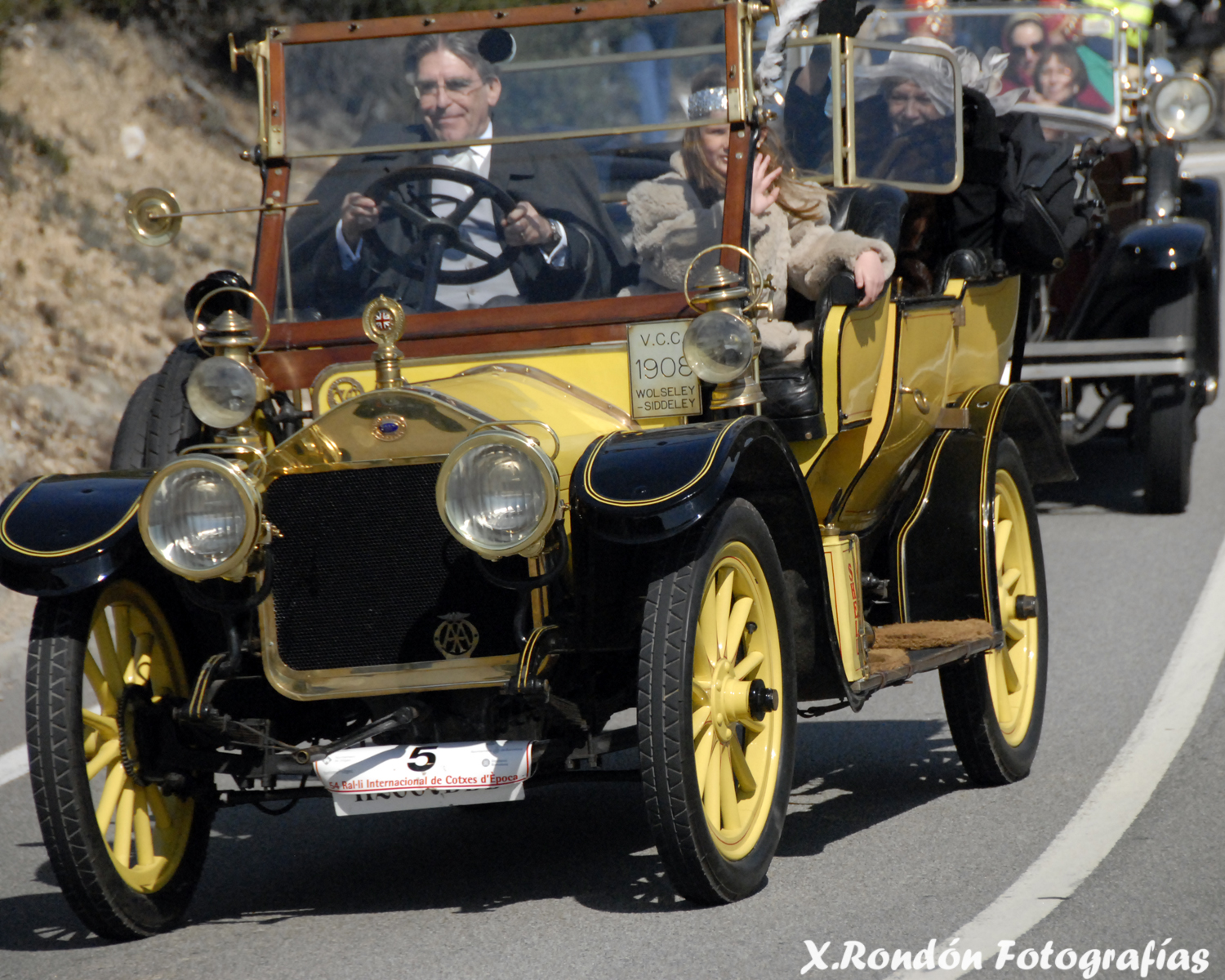
1908 Wolseley-Siddeley

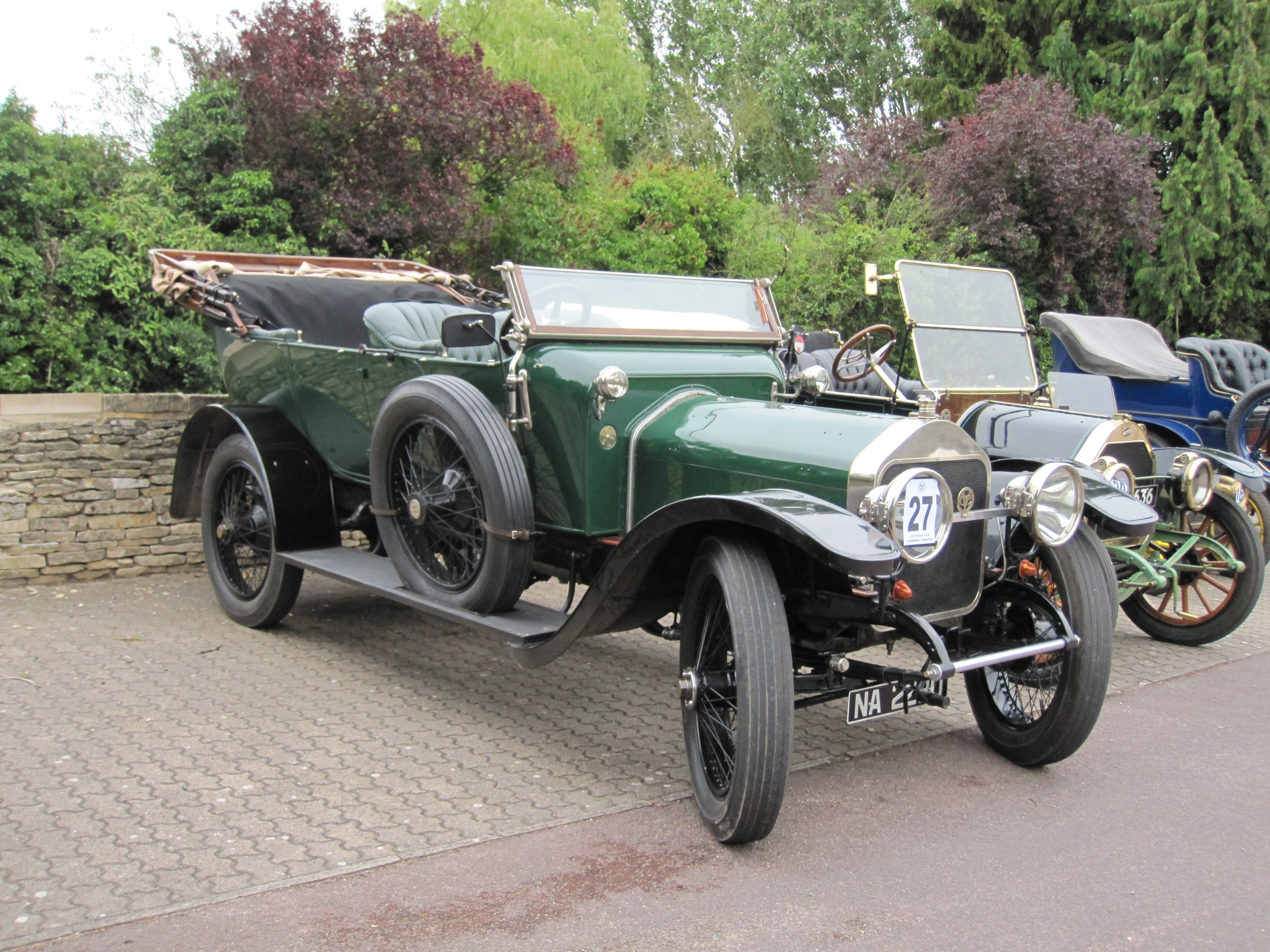
1912 Wolseley 24-30

These vehicles had conventional vertical engines
Prior to 1906 the first of these designs had been made by Vickers at their Crayford, Kent works to Siddeley's specifications and marketed by Siddeley Autocar Company Limited

| class | from | to | name | model | tax HP | disp. | cyl. | bore | stroke | ignition | gearbox speeds | final drive |
|---|---|---|---|---|---|---|---|---|---|---|---|---|
| two-cylinder | 1906 | | Wolseley-Siddeley | 12 | 16.2 | 2606 | 2 | 114.3 | 127 | coil | 3 | bevel |
| | 1907 | 1908 | Wolseley-Siddeley | 10 | 12.8 | 1852 | 2 | 101.6 | 114 | coil | 3 | bevel |
| | 1909 | | Wolseley-Siddeley | 10 | 12.8 | 1852 | 2 | 101.6 | 114 | Magneto | 3 | bevel |
| twelve | 1910 | 1911 | Wolseley-Siddeley | 12-16 | 15.5 | 2235 | 4 | 79.0 | 114 | Magneto | 3 | worm |
| | 1912 | | Wolseley | 12-16 | 15.5 | 2372 | 4 | 79.0 | 121 | Magneto | 3 | bevel |
| fourteen | 1908 | | Wolseley-Siddeley | 14 | 20.3 | 2613 | 4 | 90.5 | 102 | coil | 3 | bevel |
| | 1909 | | Wolseley-Siddeley | 14 | 20.3 | 2613 | 4 | 90.5 | 102 | magneto | 3 | bevel |
| sixteen | 1910 | | Wolseley-Siddeley | 16-20 | 20.1 | 3079 | 4 | 90.0 | 121 | dual | 3 | worm |
| | 1911 | | Wolseley | 16-20 | 20.1 | 3079 | 4 | 90.0 | 121 | dual | 4 | worm |
| | 1912 | | Wolseley | 16-20 | 20.1 | 3079 | 4 | 90.0 | 121 | dual | 4 | bevel |
| | 1913 | | Wolseley | 16-20 | 20.1 | 3079 | 4 | 90.0 | 121 | magneto | 4 | worm/bevel |
| | 1914 | 1915 | Wolseley | 16-20 | 20.1 | 3079 | 4 | 90.0 | 121 | magneto | 4 | worm |
| fifteen | 1906 | | Wolseley-Siddeley | 15 | 25.6 | 3295 | 4 | 101.6 | 102 | magneto | 3 | bevel |
| | 1907 | | Wolseley-Siddeley | 15 | 25.6 | 3295 | 4 | 101.6 | 102 | coil | 3 | bevel |
| eighteen | 1907 | | Wolseley-Siddeley | 18 | 25.6 | 3398 | 4 | 101.6 | 105 | magneto | 3 | bevel |
| | 1908 | | Wolseley-Siddeley | 18 | 25.6 | 3707 | 4 | 101.6 | 114 | coil | 3 | bevel |
| | 1908 | | Wolseley-Siddeley | 18 | 25.6 | 3707 | 4 | 101.6 | 114 | dual | 4 | bevel |
| | 1909 | | Wolseley-Siddeley | 18 | 25.6 | 3707 | 4 | 101.6 | 114 | dual | 3 | bevel |
| | 1907 | | Wolseley-Siddeley | 18 | 28.9 | 3720 | 4 | 108.0 | 102 | coil | 4 | chain |
| | 1905 | | Wolseley-Siddeley | 15 | 32.4 | 4170 | 4 | 114.3 | 102 | | 4 | chain |
| | 1906 | | Wolseley-Siddeley | 18 | 32.4 | 4170 | 4 | 114.3 | 102 | magneto | 4 | chain |
| twenty | 1910 | | Wolseley-Siddeley | 20-28 | 25.8 | 4249 | 4 | 102.0 | 130 | Dual | 4 | bevel |
| | 1911 | 1912 | Wolseley | 20-28 | 25.8 | 4249 | 4 | 102.0 | 130 | Dual | 4 | bevel |
| | 1909 | | Wolseley-Siddeley | 20 | 30.5 | 4410 | 6 | 90.5 | 114 | Dual | 4 | bevel |
| twenty-four | 1910 | | Wolseley-Siddeley | 24-30 | 30.1 | 4962 | 6 | 90.0 | 130 | Dual | 4 | worm |
| | 1911 | 1912 | Wolseley | 24-30 | 30.1 | 4962 | 6 | 90.0 | 130 | Dual | 4 | bevel |
| | 1913 | | Wolseley | 24-30 | 30.1 | 4962 | 6 | 90.0 | 130 | Dual | 4 | worm/bevel |
| | 1914 | | Wolseley | 24-30 | 30.1 | 4962 | 6 | 90.0 | 130 | Magneto | 4 | worm |
| | 1915 | | Wolseley | 24-30 | 30.1 | 4962 | 6 | 90.0 | 130 | Magneto | 4 | bevel |
| twenty-five | 1906 | | Wolseley-Siddeley | 25 | 32.4 | 5213 | 4 | 114.3 | 127 | L T Magneto | 4 | chain |
| thirty | 1907 | | Wolseley-Siddeley | 30 | 34.2 | 5506 | 4 | 117.5 | 127 | Magneto | 4 | bevel |
| | 1908 | 1909 | Wolseley-Siddeley | 30 | 34.2 | 5506 | 4 | 117.5 | 127 | Dual | 4 | bevel |
| | 1910 | | Wolseley-Siddeley | 30-34 | 34.5 | 5687 | 4 | 118.0 | 130 | Dual | 4 | bevel |
| | 1911 | | Wolseley | 30-34 | 34.5 | 5687 | 4 | 118.0 | 130 | Dual | 4 | bevel |
| thirty-five | 1912 | | Wolseley | 35-40 | 36.3 | 5980 | 4 | 121.0 | 130 | Dual | 4 | bevel |
| forty | 1908 | | Wolseley-Siddeley | 40 | 40.0 | 6596 | 4 | 127.0 | 130 | Dual | 4 | bevel |
| | 1909 | | Wolseley-Siddeley | 40 | 40.0 | 6596 | 4 | 127.0 | 130 | Dual | 4 | chain |
| | 1910 | | Wolseley-Siddeley | 40 | 40.0 | 6587 | 4 | 127.0 | 130 | Dual | 4 | bevel |
| | 1911 | | Wolseley | 40 | 40.0 | 6587 | 4 | 127.0 | 130 | Dual | 4 | bevel |
| | 1914 | | Wolseley | 30-40 | 38.7 | 6864 | 6 | 102.0 | 140 | Dual | 3 | bevel |
| | 1915 | | Wolseley | 30-40 | 38.7 | 6864 | 6 | 102.0 | 140 | Magneto | 4 | bevel |
| | 1906 | | Wolseley-Siddeley | 32 | 44.1 | 7095 | 4 | 133.4 | 127 | Magneto | 4 | chain |
| | 1907 | | Wolseley-Siddeley | 40 | 44.1 | 7095 | 4 | 133.4 | 127 | Magneto | 4 | chain |
| | 1908 | | Wolseley-Siddeley | 40 | 44.1 | 7095 | 4 | 133.4 | 127 | Dual | 4 | chain |
| | 1909 | | Wolseley-Siddeley | 40 | 44.1 | 7095 | 4 | 133.4 | 127 | Dual | 4 | bevel |
| forty-five | 1907 | 1908 | Wolseley-Siddeley | 45 | 51.3 | 8259 | 6 | 117.5 | 127 | Dual | 4 | chain |
| fifty | 1909 | | Wolseley-Siddeley | 50 | 51.3 | 8259 | 6 | 117.5 | 127 | Dual | 4 | bevel |
| | 1910 | | Wolseley-Siddeley | 40-50 | 48.3 | 8574 | 6 | 114.0 | 140 | Dual | 4 | bevel |
| | 1911 | 1912 | Wolseley | 50 | 48.3 | 8941 | 6 | 114.0 | 146 | Dual | 4 | bevel |
| | 1913 | | Wolseley | 50 | 48.3 | 8574 | 6 | 114.0 | 140 | Dual | 3 | bevel |
| sixty | 1910 | | Wolseley-Siddeley | 60 | 60.0 | 9881 | 6 | 127.0 | 130 | Dual | 4 | bevel |
| seventy | 1906 | | Wolseley-Siddeley | 70 | 67.6 | 13051 | 4 | 165.1 | 152 | L T Magneto | 3 | chain |

== Stellite ==
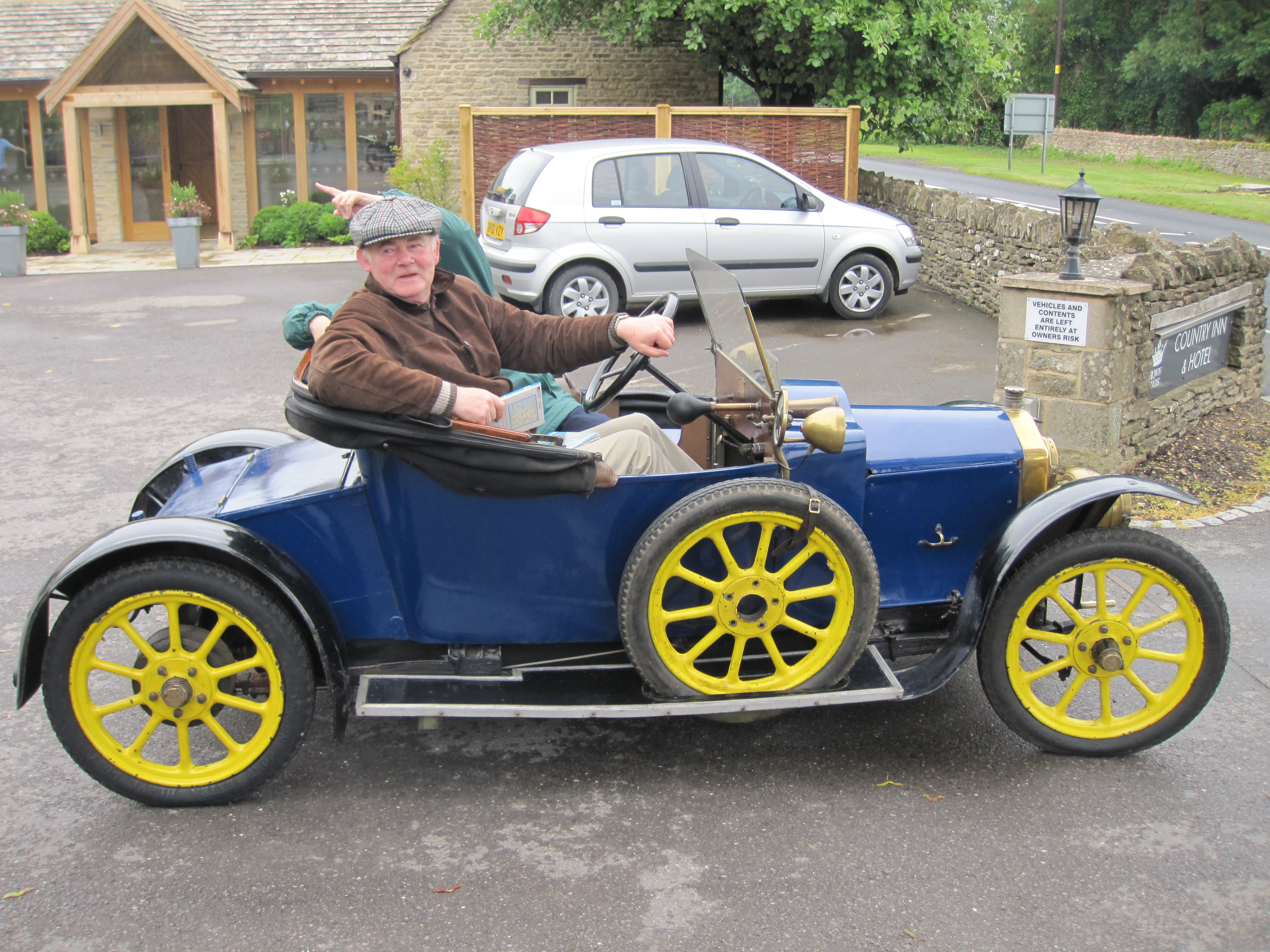
Stellite 1914

Designed by Wolseley, made by a sister company, given a new name to protect the Wolseley luxury image, introduced 1914.
Reappeared after the Armistice as Wolseley Ten

| class | from | to | name | model | tax HP | disp. | cyl. | bore | stroke | ignition | gearbox speeds | final drive |
|---|---|---|---|---|---|---|---|---|---|---|---|---|
| Ten HP | 1914 | | Stellite | 9 | 9.5 | 1075 | 4 | 62.0 | 89 | Magneto | 2 & 3 | worm |

== Inter-war cars 1920 to 1940 ==
=== Two, four and six-cylinder cars ===
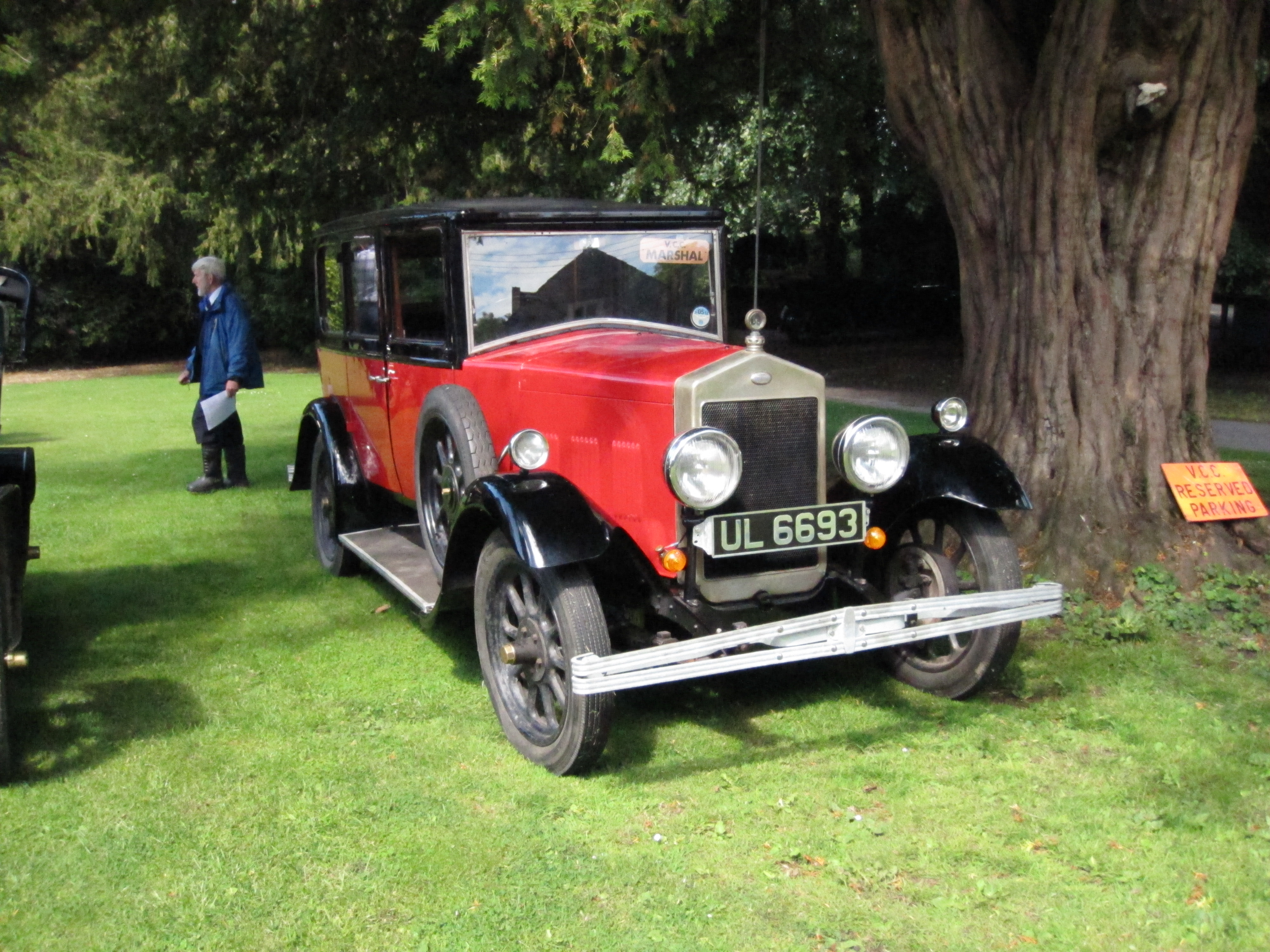
1929 Wolseley 16-45

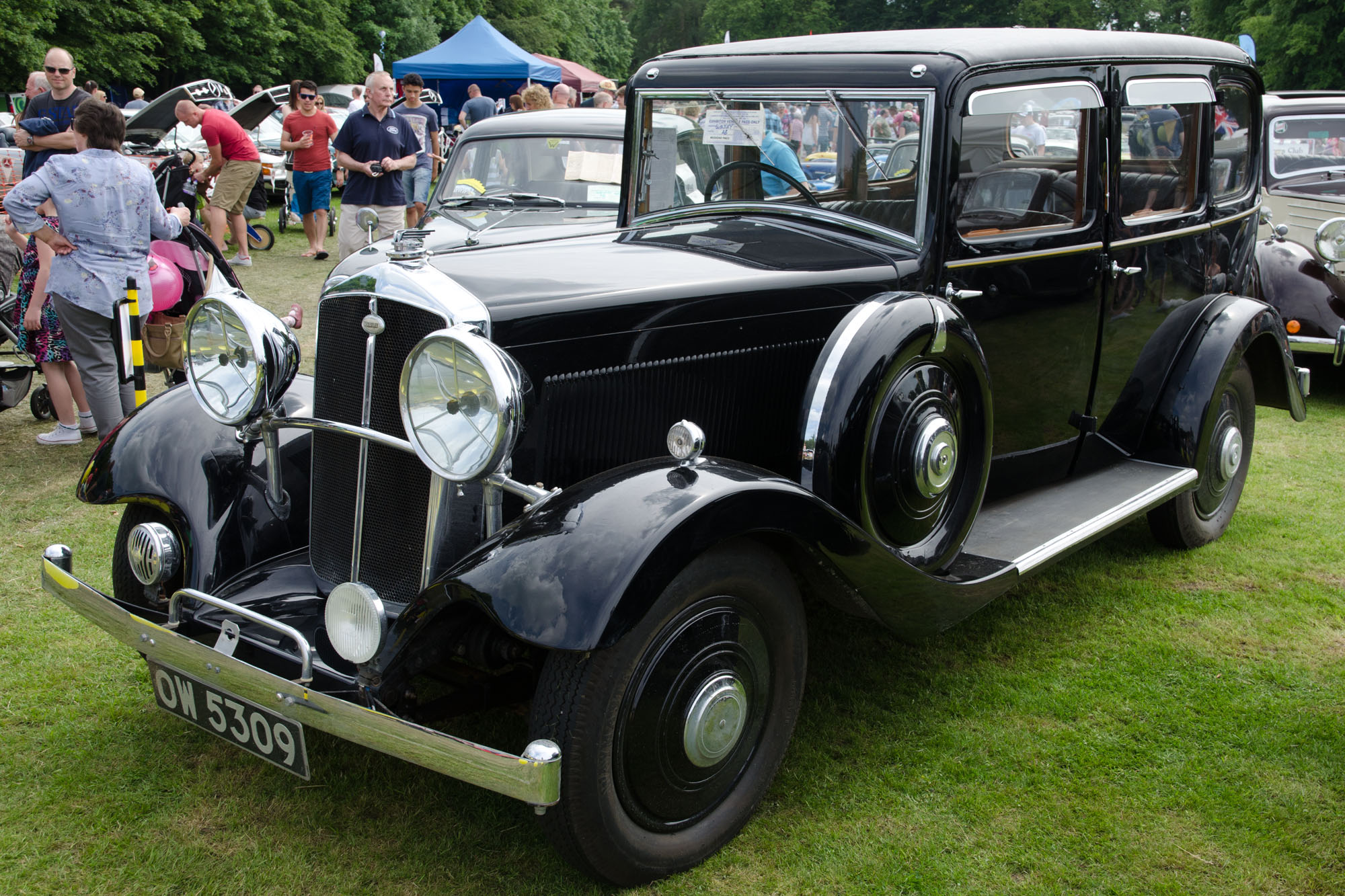
1934 Wolseley 21-60

| from | to | name | model | tax HP | disp. | cyl. | bore | stroke | ignition | gearbox speeds | final drive | |
|---|---|---|---|---|---|---|---|---|---|---|---|---|
| seven | 1924 | | Wolseley | Seven | 8.3 | 972 | 2 | 82.0 | 92.0 | Coil | 3 | spiral bevel |
| nine | 1934 | | Wolseley | Nine | 8.9 | 1018 | 4 | 60.0 | 90.0 | Coil | 4 | spiral bevel |
| ten | 1920 | 1923 | Wolseley | Ten | 10.5 | 1261 | 4 | 65.0 | 95.0 | Magneto | 3 | worm |
| | 1924 | | Wolseley | Ten | 10.5 | 1261 | 4 | 65.0 | 95.0 | Coil | 3 | worm |
| | 1925 | 1928 | Wolseley | 11-22 | 10.5 | 1261 | 4 | 65.0 | 95.0 | Magneto | 3 | worm |
| twelve | 1929 | 1930 | Wolseley | 12-32 | 12.0 | 1533 | 4 | 69.5 | 101.0 | Magneto | 4 | spiral bevel |
| | 1931 | 1934 | Wolseley | Hornet | 12.1 | 1271 | 6 | 57.0 | 83.0 | Coil | 3 | spiral bevel |
| | 1935 | 1936 | Wolseley | Hornet | 12.1 | 1378 | 6 | 57.0 | 90.0 | Coil | 4 | spiral bevel |
| fifteen | 1920 | 1923 | Wolseley | Fifteen | 15.9 | 2614 | 4 | 80.0 | 130.0 | Magneto | 3 | worm |
| | 1924 | | Wolseley | Fourteen | 15.9 | 2614 | 4 | 80.0 | 130.0 | Magneto | 3 | worm |
| | 1924 | | Wolseley | Fifteen | 15.9 | 2614 | 4 | 80.0 | 130.0 | Coil | 4 | spiral bevel |
| | 1925 | | Wolseley | 15-40 | 15.9 | 2614 | 4 | 80.0 | 130.0 | Coil | 4 | spiral bevel |
| sixteen | 1925 | 1927 | Wolseley | 16-35 | 15.9 | 2614 | 4 | 80.0 | 130.0 | Magneto | 3 | worm |
| | 1927 | 1931 | Wolseley | 16-45 | 15.7 | 2011 | 6 | 65.0 | 101.0 | Magneto | 4 | spiral bevel |
| | 1931 | | Wolseley | Viper | 15.7 | 2011 | 6 | 65.0 | 101.0 | Coil | 3 | spiral bevel |
| | 1932 | 1934 | Wolseley | Sixteen | 15.7 | 2011 | 6 | 65.0 | 101.0 | Coil | 4 | spiral bevel |
| twenty | 1929 | 1932 | Wolseley | 21-60 | 20.9 | 2677 | 6 | 75.0 | 101.0 | Magneto | 4 | spiral bevel |
| | 1933 | 1935 | Wolseley | County | 20.9 | 2677 | 6 | 75.0 | 101.0 | Coil | 4 | spiral bevel |
| twenty-four | 1920 | 1924 | Wolseley | Twenty | 23.8 | 3921 | 6 | 80.0 | 130.0 | Magneto | 4 | worm |
| | 1923 | 1924 | Wolseley | 24-30 | 30.1 | 5344 | 6 | 90.0 | 140.0 | Magneto | 4 | worm |
| | 1925 | 1927 | Wolseley | 24-55 | 23.8 | 3921 | 6 | 80.0 | 130.0 | Magneto | 4 | spiral bevel |

=== Straight-eight-cylinder cars ===
| class | from | to | name | model | tax HP | disp. | cyl. | bore | stroke | ignition | gearbox speeds | final drive |
|---|---|---|---|---|---|---|---|---|---|---|---|---|
| twenty | 1928 | 1931 | Wolseley | 21-60 | 21.0 | 2681 | 8 | 65.0 | 101.0 | Coil | 4 | spiral bevel |
| thirty-two | 1929 | 1930 | Wolseley | 32-80 | 31.7 | 4021 | 8 | 80.0 | 100.0 | Coil | 4 | spiral bevel |

== Badge-engineered Morris cars from 1935 ==
=== Prewar cars ===
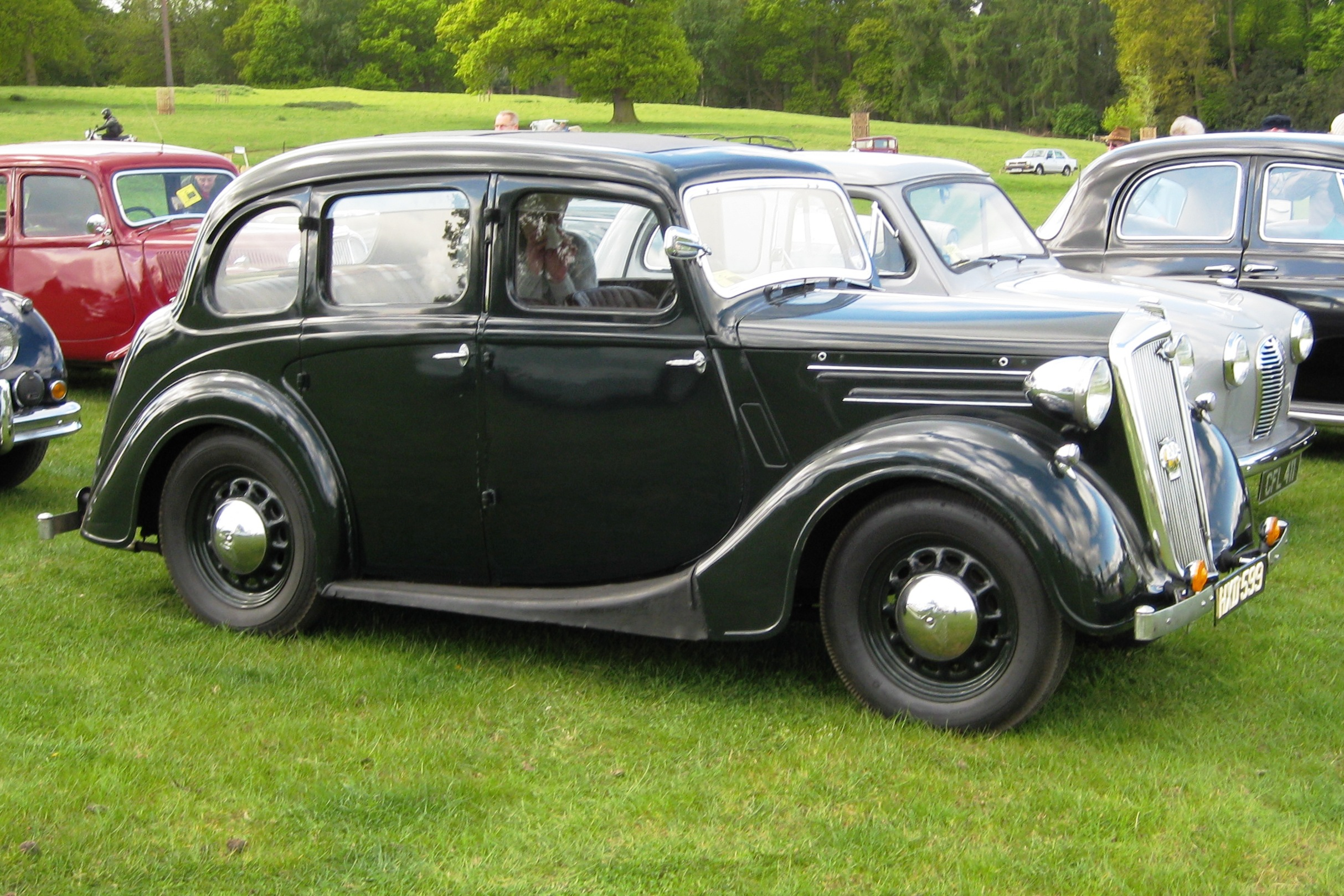
Wolseley Ten

| class | from | to | name | model | tax HP | disp. | cyl. | bore | stroke | ignition | gearbox speeds | final drive |
|---|---|---|---|---|---|---|---|---|---|---|---|---|
| eight | 1946 | 1948 | Wolseley | 8 | 8.06 | 919 | 4 | 57.0 | 90 | Coil | 4 | spiral bevel |
| ten | 1935 | 1936 | Wolseley | Wasp | 9.4 | 1069 | 4 | 61.5 | 90 | Coil | 4 | spiral bevel |
| | 1937 | | Wolseley | 10-40 | 10.0 | 1292 | 4 | 63.5 | 102 | Coil | 4 | spiral bevel |
| | 1938 | 1939 | Wolseley | 10-40 | 10.0 | 1140 | 4 | 63.5 | 90 | Coil | 4 | spiral bevel |
| | 1946 | 1948 | Wolseley | 10 | 10.0 | 1140 | 4 | 63.5 | 90 | Coil | 4 | spiral bevel |
| twelve | 1935 | 1936 | Wolseley | Hornet | 12.1 | 1378 | 6 | 57.0 | 90 | Coil | 4 | spiral bevel |
| | 1937 | 1948 | Wolseley | 12-48 | 12.0 | 1548 | 4 | 69.5 | 102 | Coil | 4 | spiral bevel |
| fourteen | 1935 | | Wolseley | 14 | 14.1 | 1604 | 6 | 61.5 | 90 | Coil | 4 | spiral bevel |
| | 1936 | | Wolseley | New 14 | 14.1 | 1604 | 6 | 61.5 | 90 | Coil | 4 | spiral bevel |
| | 1937 | | Wolseley | 14-56 | 14.1 | 1604 | 6 | 61.5 | 90 | Coil | 4 | spiral bevel |
| | 1938 | | Wolseley | 14-56 | 14.1 | 1818 | 6 | 61.5 | 102 | Coil | 4 | spiral bevel |
| | 1939 | 1948 | Wolseley | 14-60 | 14.1 | 1818 | 6 | 61.5 | 102 | Coil | 4 | spiral bevel |
| sixteen | 1936 | 1938 | Wolseley | Sixteen | 16.0 | 2062 | 6 | 65.5 | 102 | Coil | 4 | spiral bevel |
| | 1939 | | Wolseley | 16-65 | 16.0 | 2062 | 6 | 65.5 | 102 | Coil | 4 | spiral bevel |
| eighteen | 1937 | 1938 | Wolseley | 18-80 | 18.0 | 2322 | 6 | 69.5 | 102 | Coil | 4 | spiral bevel |
| | 1939 | 1948 | Wolseley | 18-85 | 18.0 | 2322 | 6 | 69.5 | 102 | Coil | 4 | spiral bevel |
| twenty-one | 1935 | | Wolseley | 21-60 | 20.9 | 2677 | 6 | 75.0 | 101 | Coil | 4 | spiral bevel |
| | 1936 | 1939 | Wolseley | 21 | 20.9 | 2916 | 6 | 75.0 | 110 | Coil | 4 | spiral bevel |
| twenty-five | 1936 | 1948 | Wolseley | 25 | 25.0 | 3485 | 6 | 82.0 | 110 | Coil | 4 | spiral bevel |

=== Postwar cars: rear wheel drive ===
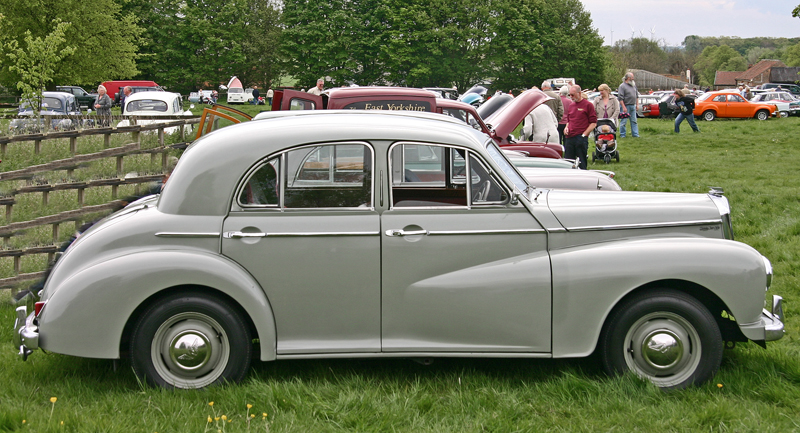
Wolseley 4/50

| class | from | to | name | model | tax HP (Note: Obsolete and shown for comparison) | disp. | cyl. | bore | stroke | engine |
|---|---|---|---|---|---|---|---|---|---|---|
| four-cylinder | 1949 | 1952 | Wolseley | 4-50 | 13.4 | 1476 | 4 | 73.5 | 87 | OHC Wolseley |
| | 1952 | 1956 | Wolseley | 4/44 | 11.0 | 1250 | 4 | 66.5 | 90 | XPAW (MG) |
| | 1953 | 1958 | Wolseley | 15-50 | 13.2 | 1489 | 4 | 73.0 | 89 | B series |
| | 1957 | 1965 | Wolseley | 1500 | 13.2 | 1489 | 4 | 73.0 | 89 | B series |
| | 1959 | 1961 | Wolseley | 15/60 | 13.2 | 1489 | 4 | 73.0 | 89 | B series |
| | 1961 | 1971 | Wolseley | 16/60 | 14.4 | 1622 | 4 | 76.2 | 89 | B series |
| | | | Wolseley | 4/60 | 14.4 | 1622 | 4 | 76.2 | 89 | B series |
| six-cylinder | 1949 | 1954 | Wolseley | 6-80 | 20.1 | 2215 | 6 | 73.5 | 87 | OHC Wolseley |
| | 1954 | 1959 | Wolseley | 6-90 | 23.4 | 2639 | 6 | 79.4 | 89 | C series |
| | 1959 | 1961 | Wolseley | 6-99 | 25.8 | 2912 | 6 | 83.3 | 89 | C series |
| | 1959 | | Wolseley | 300 | 25.8 | 2912 | 6 | 83.3 | 89 | C series |
| | 1961 | 1968 | Wolseley | 6/110 | 25.8 | 2912 | 6 | 83.3 | 89 | C series |
| | 1962 | 1965 | Wolseley | 24/80 | 21.6 | 2433 | 6 | 76.2 | 89 | B series |

=== Postwar cars: front wheel drive ===
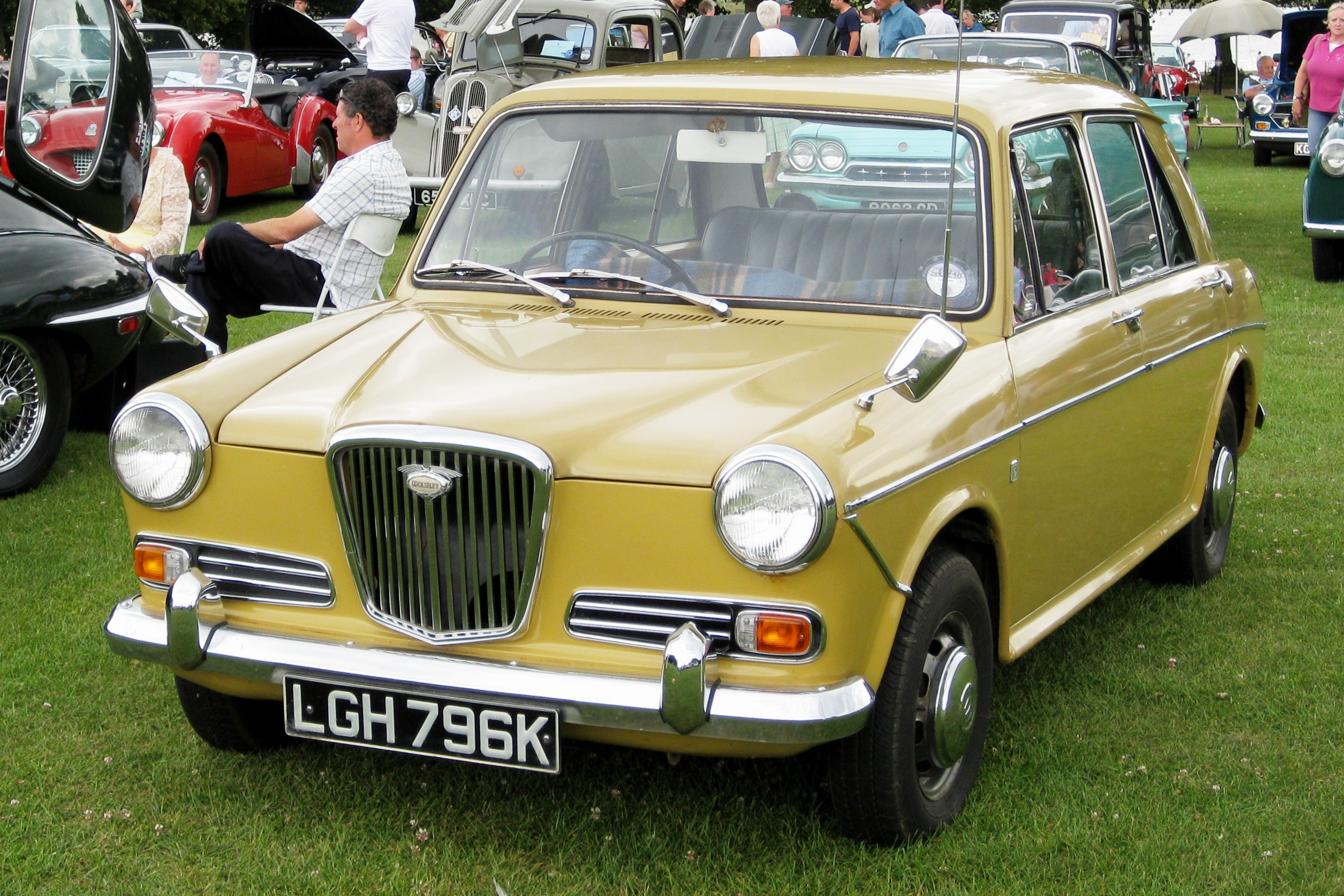
1972 Wolseley 1300

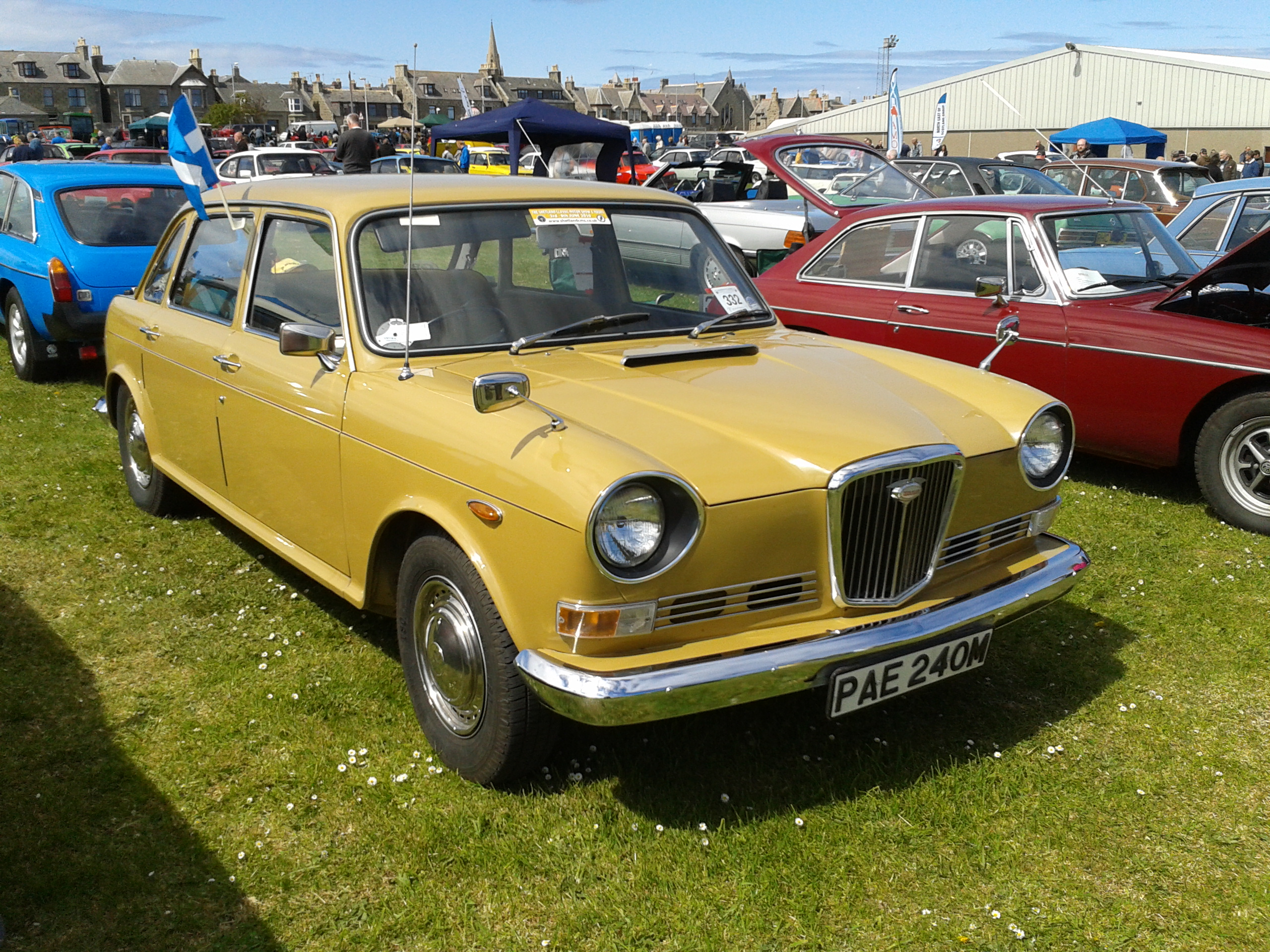
1973 Wolseley Six

| class | from | to | name | model | tax HP | disp. | cyl. | bore | stroke | engine |
|---|---|---|---|---|---|---|---|---|---|---|
| four-cylinder | 1961 | 1969 | Wolseley | Hornet | 9.8 | 848 | 4 | 63.0 | 68 | A series |
| | 1967 | 1969 | Wolseley | 1000 | | 998 | 4 | | | A series |
| | 1965 | 1968 | Wolseley | 1100 | 10.3 | 1098 | 4 | 64.6 | 84 | A series |
| | | | Wolseley | 11/55 | 10.3 | 1098 | 4 | 64.6 | 84 | A series |
| | | | Wolseley | Wesp | 10.3 | 1098 | 4 | 64.6 | 84 | A series |
| | 1967 | 1967 | Wolseley | 1275 | | 1275 | 4 | | | A series |
| | 1967 | 1973 | Wolseley | 1300 | 12.4 | 1275 | 4 | 70.6 | 81 | A series |
| | 1967 | 1972 | Wolseley | 18/85 | 16.0 | 1798 | 4 | 80.3 | 89 | B series |
| six-cylinder | 1972 | 1975 | Wolseley | Six | 21.6 | 2227 | 6 | 76.2 | 81 | E series |
| | 1975 | 1975 | Wolseley | Saloon | 21.6 | 2227 | 6 | 76.2 | 81 | E series |
