= Wolseley 18/85 =

Wolseley 18/85 may refer to the following British cars:

- Wolseley 18/85 (1938 to 1948)
- Wolseley 18/85 (1967 to 1971), a variant of the BMC ADO17
