= Wolseley Wasp =

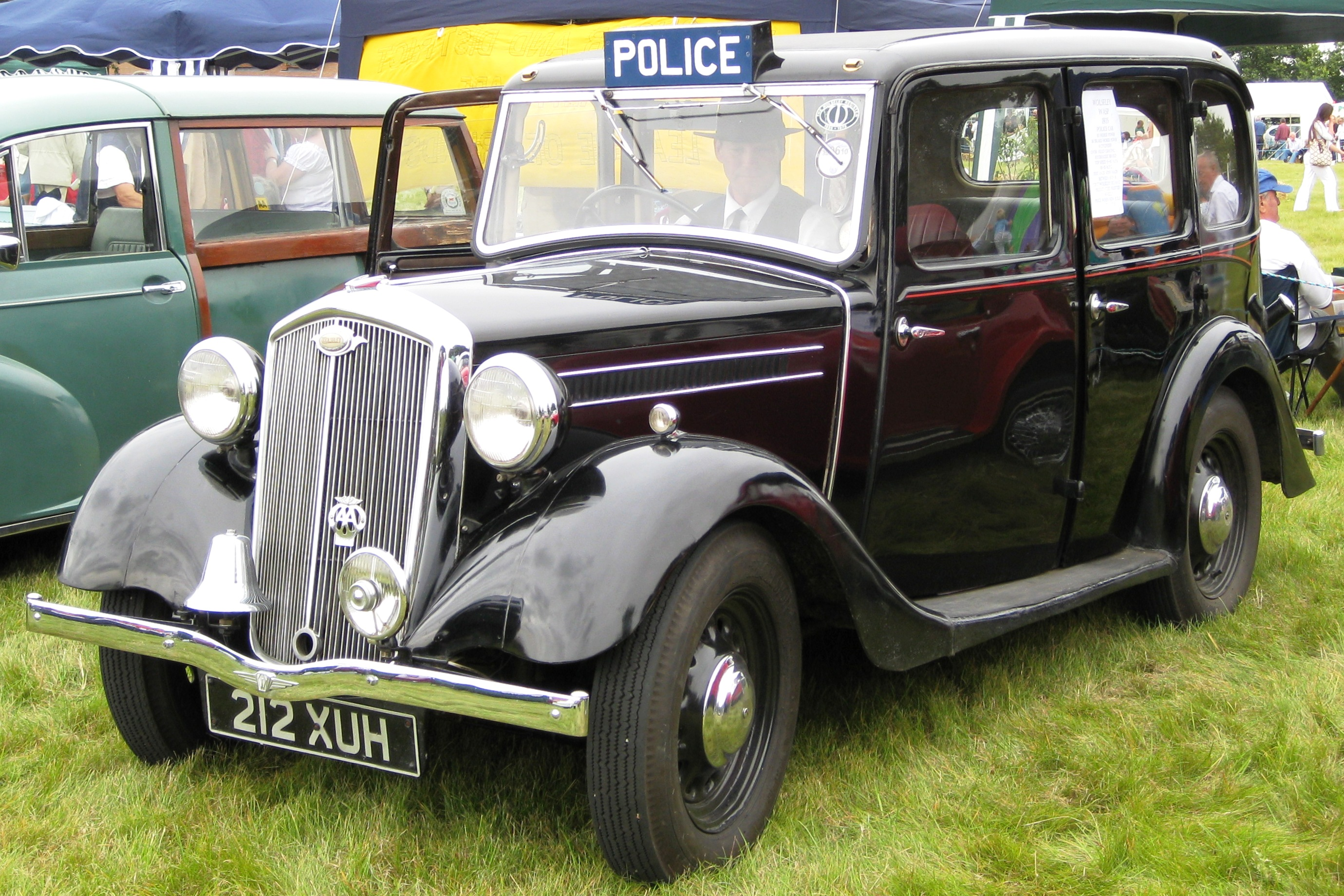
- Wasp 6-light saloon

Overview
- Manufacturer: Wolseley Motors Limited
- Production: 1935–1936

Body and chassis
- Body style: 4-door saloon

Powertrain
- Engine: 1069 cc four-cylinder overhead camshaft

Dimensions
- Wheelbase: 90 in (2,300 mm)
- Length: 137 in (3,500 mm)
- Width: 57.5 in (1,460 mm)

Chronology
- Successor: Wolseley Ten

The Wolseley Wasp was a light saloon car produced by Wolseley Motors Limited in 1935 and 1936. It was an updated version of the Wolseley Nine model with a larger engine and steel disc wheels.

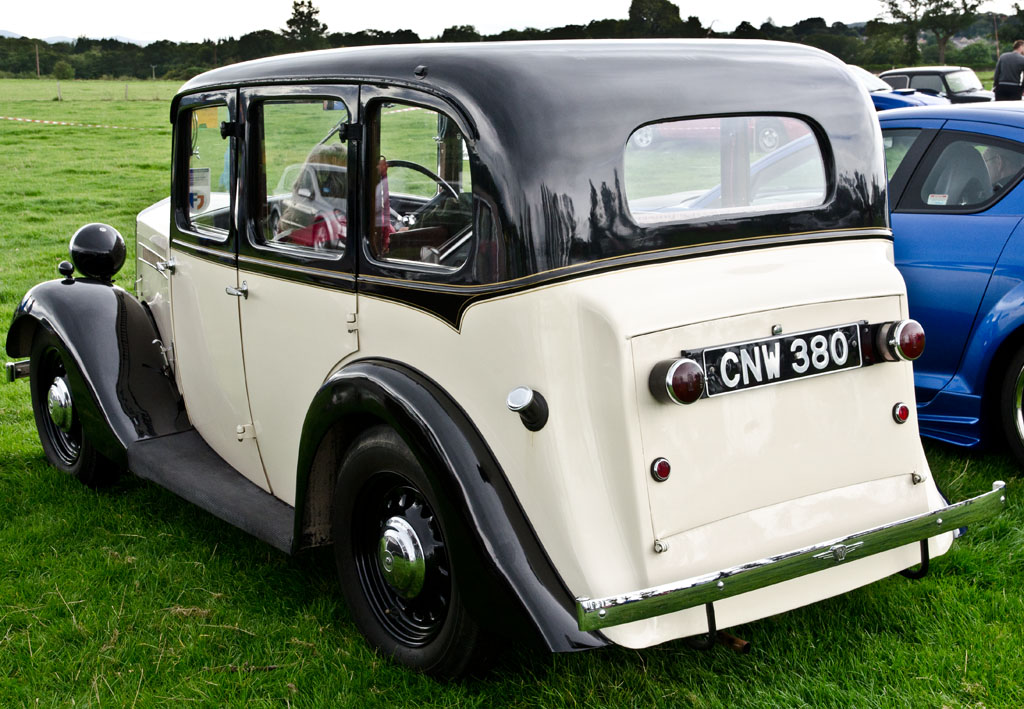
Wasp 6-light saloon, 1935

The overhead camshaft engine had 12-volt electrics and drove the rear wheels via a four-speed gearbox. Hydraulic brakes were fitted.

In all, 5,815 cars were made.
