= Wolseley Ten =

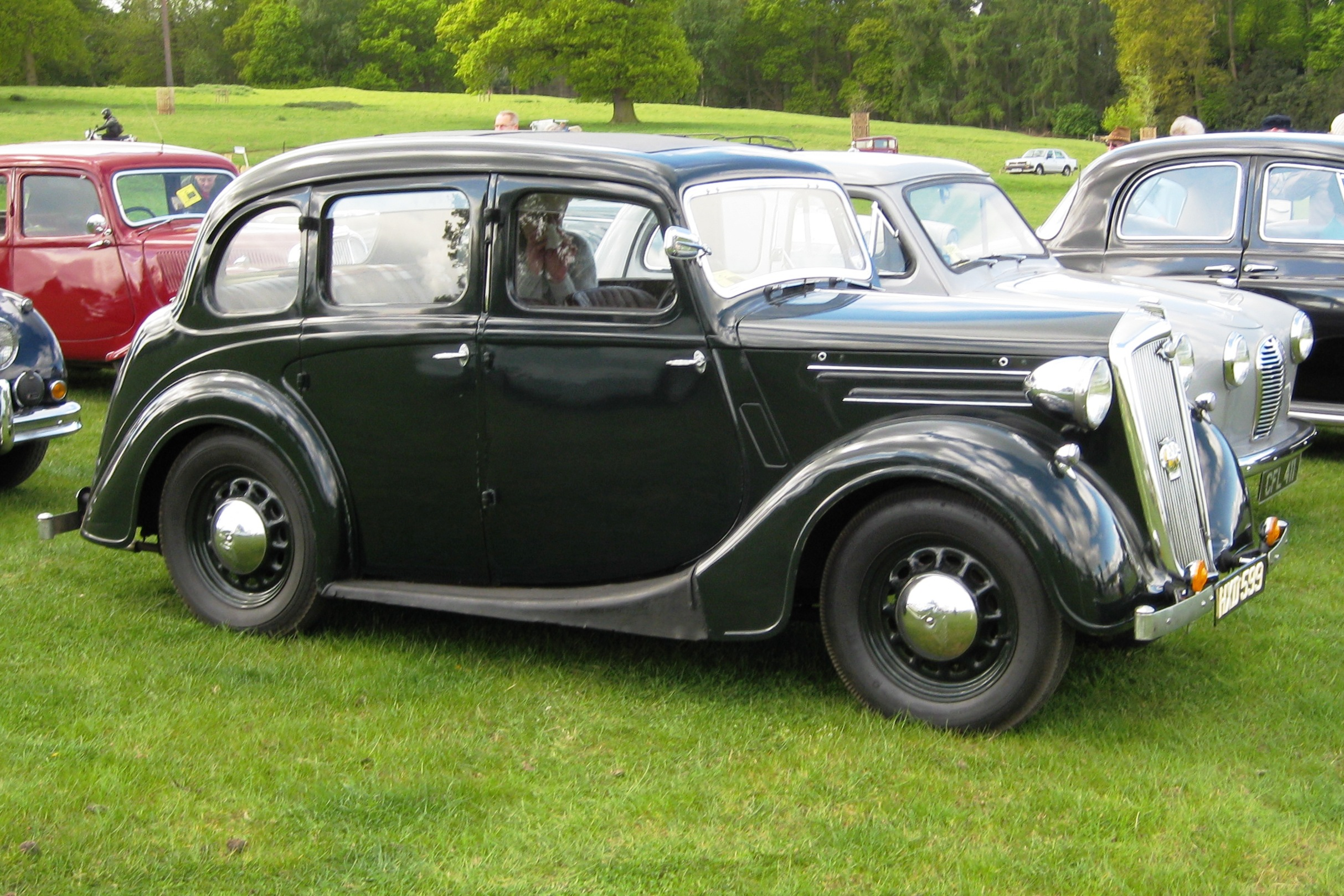
- Wolseley Ten 4-door saloon

Overview
- Manufacturer: Wolseley Motors Limited
- Production: 1939–1948; 7976 made
- Assembly: Ward End Works, Birmingham, UK.

Body and chassis
- Body style: 4-door saloon 2-door drophead coupé

Powertrain
- Engine: 1140 cc overhead valve four cylinder
- Transmission: 4-speed manual

Dimensions
- Wheelbase: 90 in (2,300 mm)
- Length: 147 in (3,700 mm)
- Width: 57 in (1,400 mm)

Chronology
- Predecessor: Wolseley 10/40
- Successor: Wolseley 4/50

The Wolseley Ten is a light car which was produced by Wolseley Motors Limited in 1939 and from 1945 to 1948.

The ten horsepower class of cars was an important part of the market in 1930s Britain and Wolseley entered the sector with their 10/40 of 1936 based on the contemporary Morris Ten. Both Morris and Wolseley were part of the Nuffield Organization. The 10/40 ceased production in 1937 and it was not until February 1939 that Wolseley introduced the Ten as a replacement.

The new car was again based on the Morris Ten, this time the 1938 Series M but with an important difference. Whereas the Morris car had a semi unitary construction, the Wolseley had a substantial steel section chassis with cruciform bracing. Many of the steel body pressings were shared. To keep the weight down, the wheelbase at 90 in (2,300 mm) was 4 in (100 mm) shorter than the Morris. Suspension was not independent and used semi elliptic leaf springs all round. Lockheed hydraulic drum brakes were fitted. The 1140 cc engine designated XPJW was also slightly more powerful than the one in the Morris delivering 40 bhp (30 kW; 41 PS) as against 37 bhp (28 kW; 38 PS).

As the car was intended to compete in the up-market sector, it was well equipped with leather upholstery, pile carpets and walnut trim. The seats were early users of Dunlopillo foam rubber, rather than traditional metal coil springs, possibly the first mass-produced car to use this new material. The steering column was adjustable for both angle and reach. At launch the car was priced at £215, £40 more than the Morris with the option of a built-in Jackall system that could hydraulically lift a wheel off the ground for tyre changing an extra £5.

In June 1939 the saloon was joined by a factory-built two-door drophead coupé priced at £270, but very few seem to have been made. London dealer Eustace Watkins also offered their own drophead version. With the outbreak of World War II in 1939, production of Wolseley cars, including the Ten, eventually stopped. 5261 of the model had been made before production ceased in early 1941.

Production restarted in September 1945 but without the drophead version. The price had risen considerably to £474 (partly due to higher taxes) against the Morris's £378. The Ten was discontinued in 1948 after 2715 more had been built when the first of the post war designs arrived. The new small Wolseley was the 4/50 but with a 1.5 litre engine was a larger car and not a real replacement. With Morris Motors (owners of Wolseley's parent company the Nuffield Organization) merging with the Austin Motor Company to form the British Motor Corporation in 1952, this sector of the market would be left to Austin and Morris.

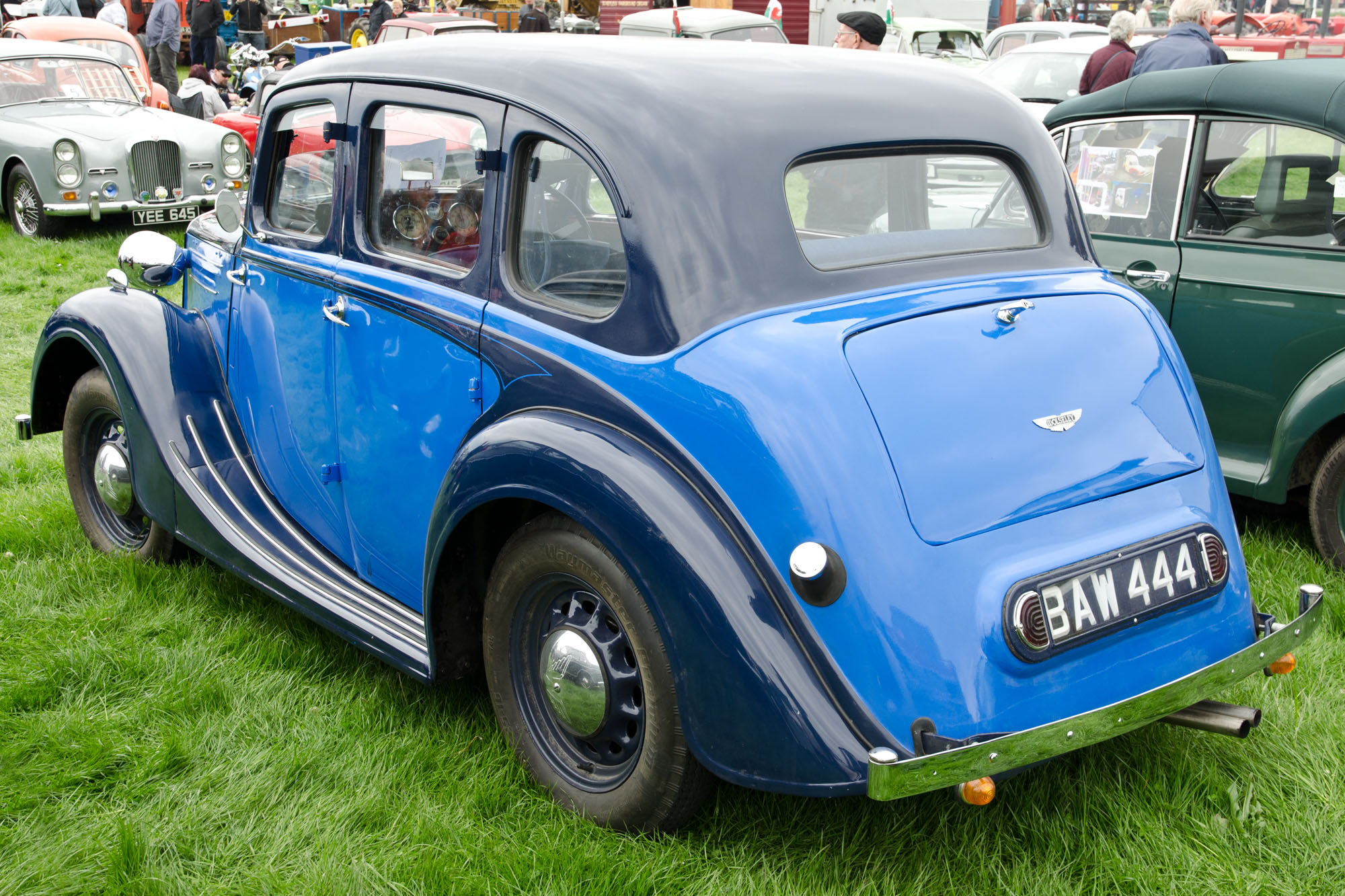
1939 Wolseley Ten 4-door saloon
