= Wolseley 14/60 =

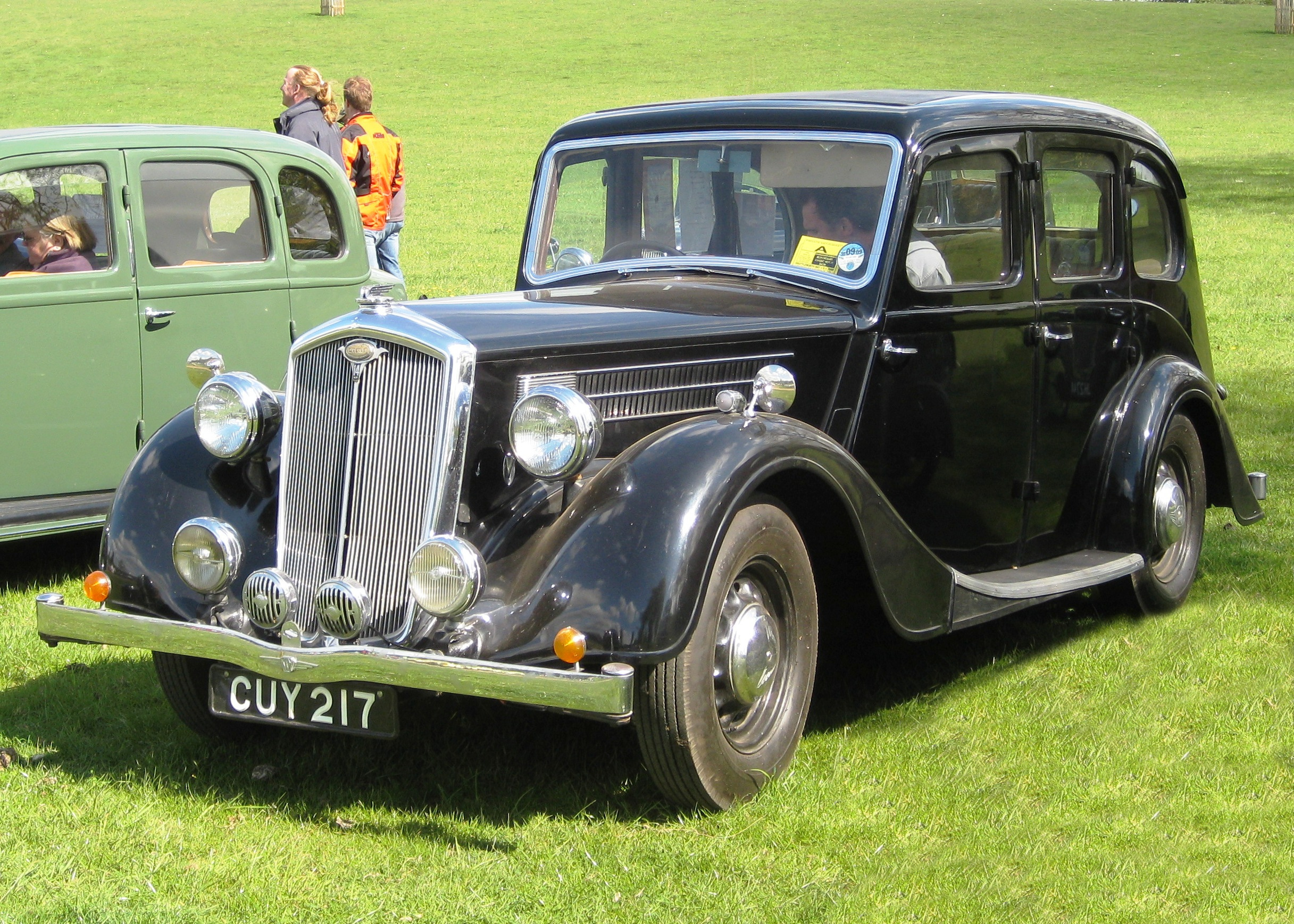
- 1938 Wolseley 14/60 saloon

Overview
- Manufacturer: Wolseley Motors
- Production: 1938–1948; 5,731 built post war

Body and chassis
- Body style: 4 door saloon tourer
- Layout: FR layout

Powertrain
- Engine: 1,818 cc (110.9 cu in), straight-6

Dimensions
- Wheelbase: 104.75 in (2,661 mm)

Chronology
- Successor: Wolseley 6/80

The Wolseley 14/60 is an automobile that was produced by Wolseley Motors in the United Kingdom between 1938 and 1948.

Introduced in 1938 as part of the Wolseley Series III range, the 14/60 was built on a 104¾ inch wheelbase and was powered by a 60 bhp, twin carburettor, 1,818 cc (110.9 cu in), inline six-cylinder engine. It shared its styling with the Wolseley 12/48 which was introduced in 1937. The 14/60 was offered as a four-door saloon with a small number of ‘Redfern’ tourers also produced.

Post-war production commenced in 1945 and totalled 5,731 vehicles.

A 1938 Wolseley 14/60 features prominently in the ITV crime/mystery series Foyle's War.

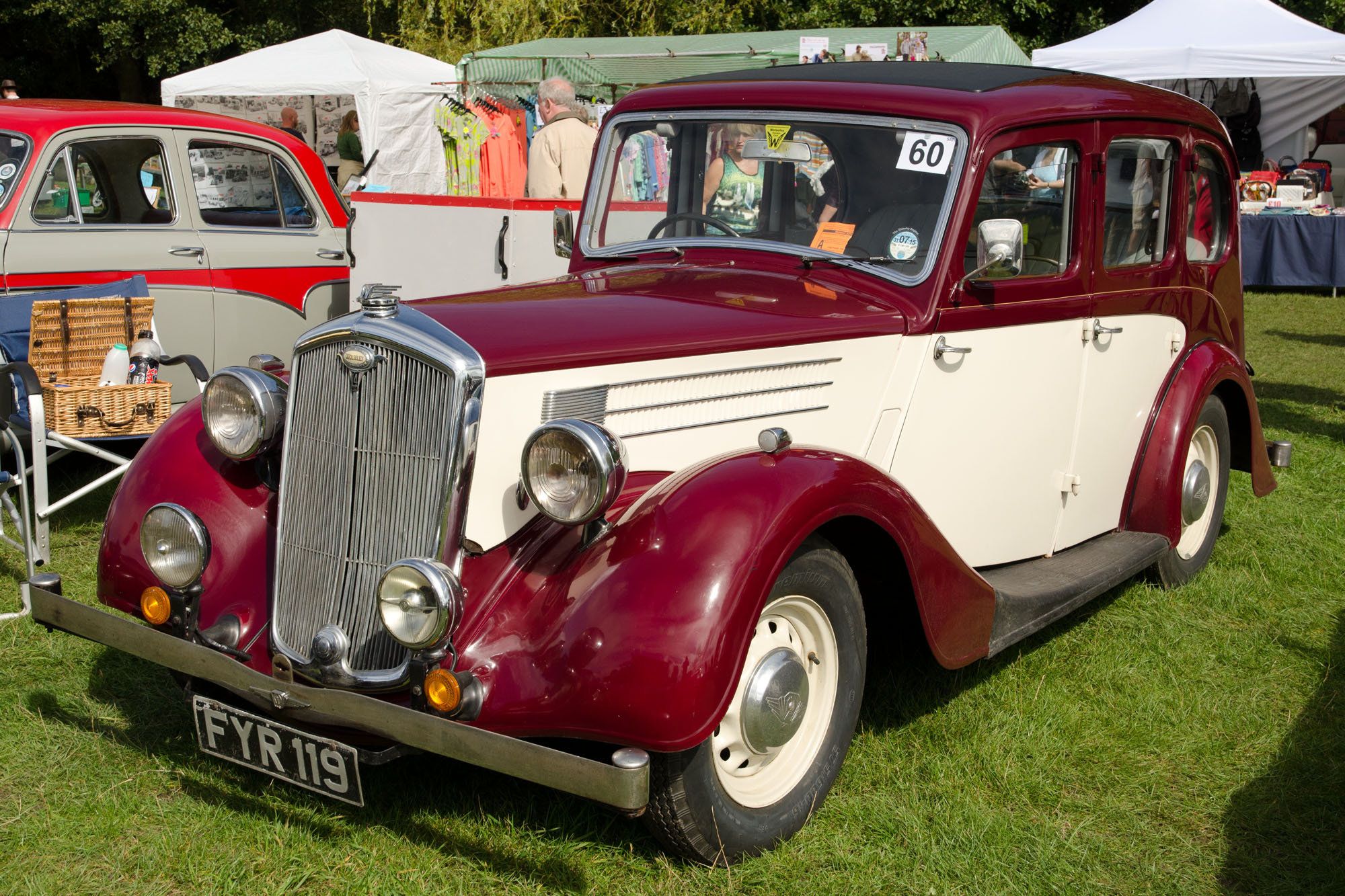
1939

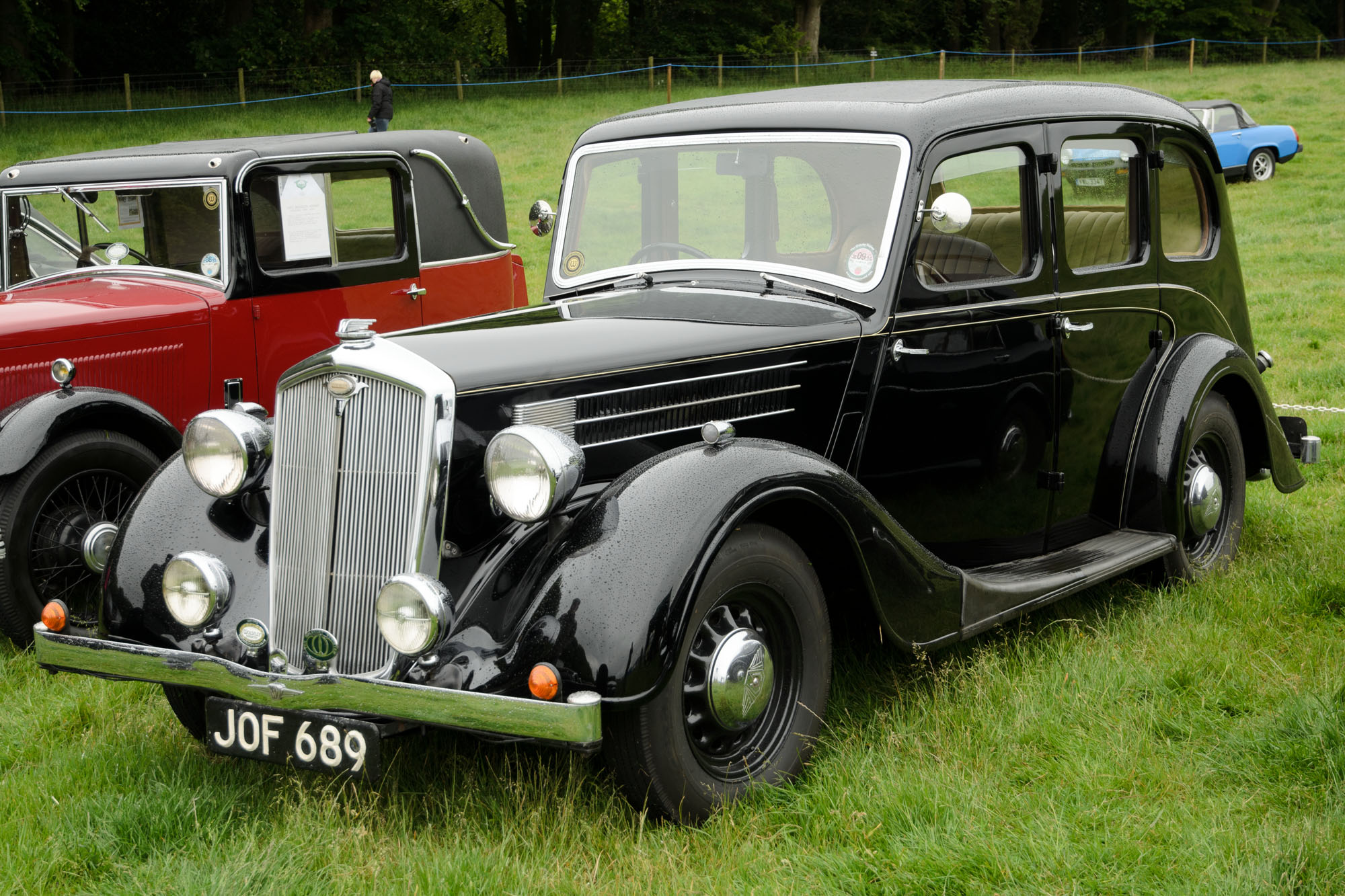
1948

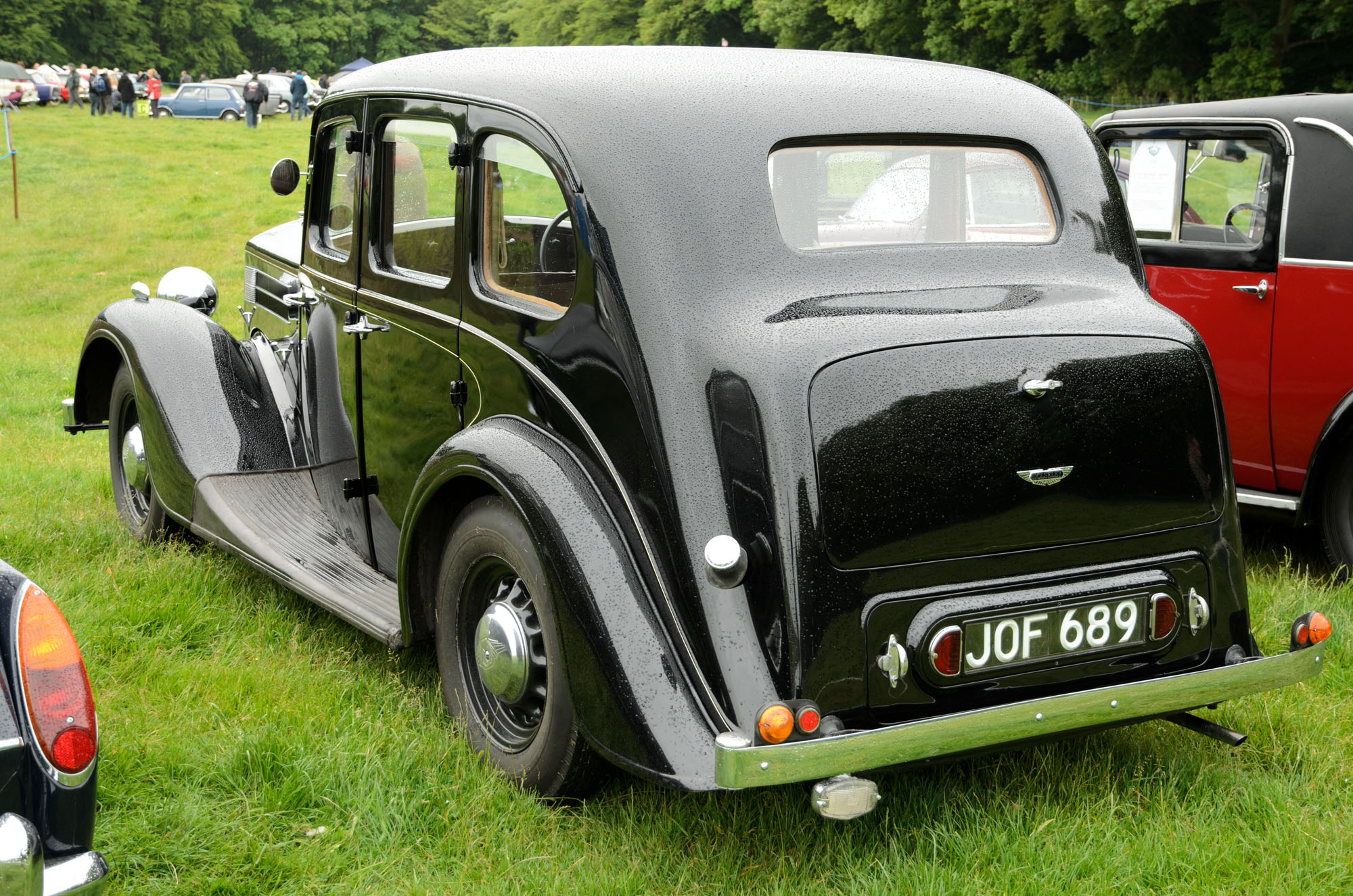
1948
