= Wolseley 18/85 (1938 to 1948) =

Wolseley 18/85 (1938–1948)
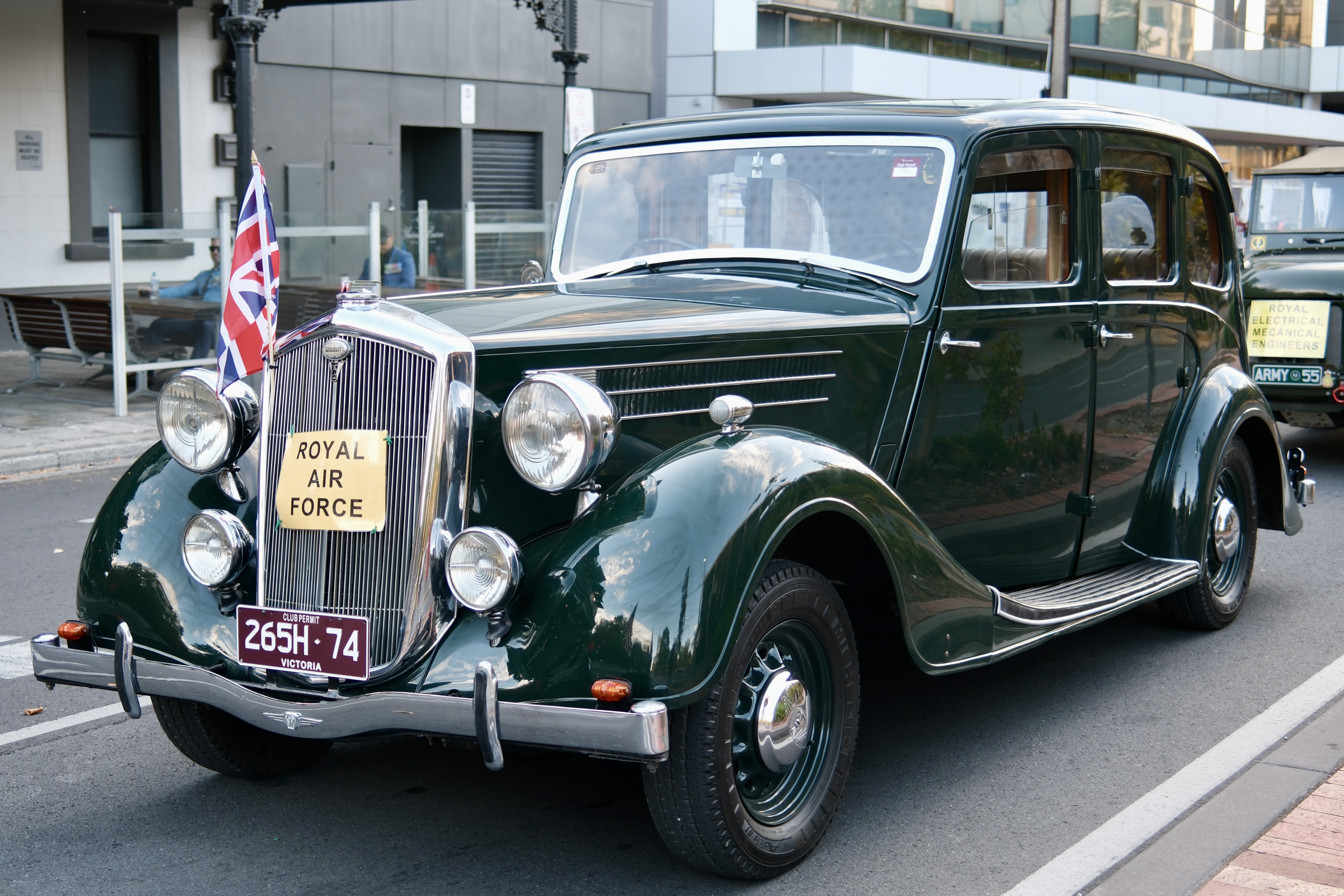
- 1948 Wolseley 18/85 Series III

Overview
- Manufacturer: Wolseley
- Production: 1938–1939; 1945–1948; 8213 built post war

Body and chassis
- Body style: 4 door saloon
- Layout: FR layout

Powertrain
- Engine: 2,322 cc (141.7 cu in) Straight-6

Dimensions
- Wheelbase: 2,654 mm (104.5 in)
- Length: 4,369 mm (172.0 in)
- Width: 1,702 mm (67.0 in)
- Height: 1,676 mm (66.0 in)
- Curb weight: 1,422 kg (3,135 lb)

Chronology
- Successor: Wolseley 6/80

The Wolseley 18/85 is an automobile which was produced by Wolseley in the United Kingdom from 1938 to 1939 and from 1945 until 1948.

Introduced in 1938, the 18/85 was built on a 104 in (2,600 mm) wheelbase, and was powered by an 85 bhp, twin carburettor, overhead valve, 2,322 cc (141.7 cu in), inline six-cylinder engine, which it shared with the MG SA. Post-war production of the model began in the autumn of 1945 and totalled 8213 vehicles.

== Achievements ==
An 18/85 driven by Humphrey Symons and Bertie Browning set a London to Cape Town record of 31 days 22 hours, completing the 10,300 mile journey on 21 January 1939. The time included a 12-day break for repairs following a plunge into the Gada River in the Belgian Congo. Bertie Browning kept a handwritten diary during the trip.

== Wolseley 18/85 (1967–1972) ==
The 18/85 model name was again used on a Wolseley from 1967 to 1972. This was a variant of the BMC ADO17, which was also marketed under Austin and Morris names.

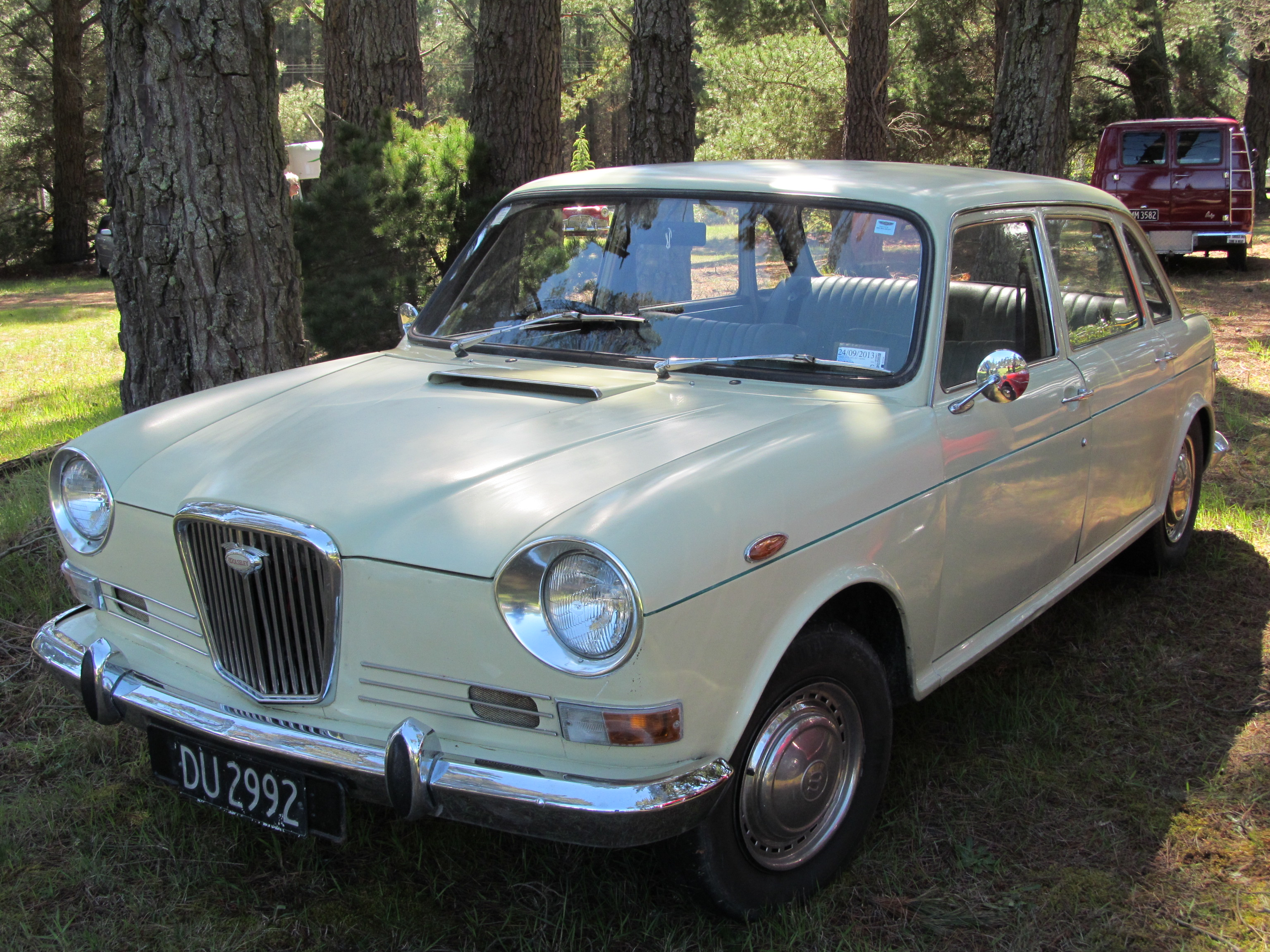
1969 Wolseley 18/85
