= Wolseley 4/50 =

Wolseley 4/50 and 6/80
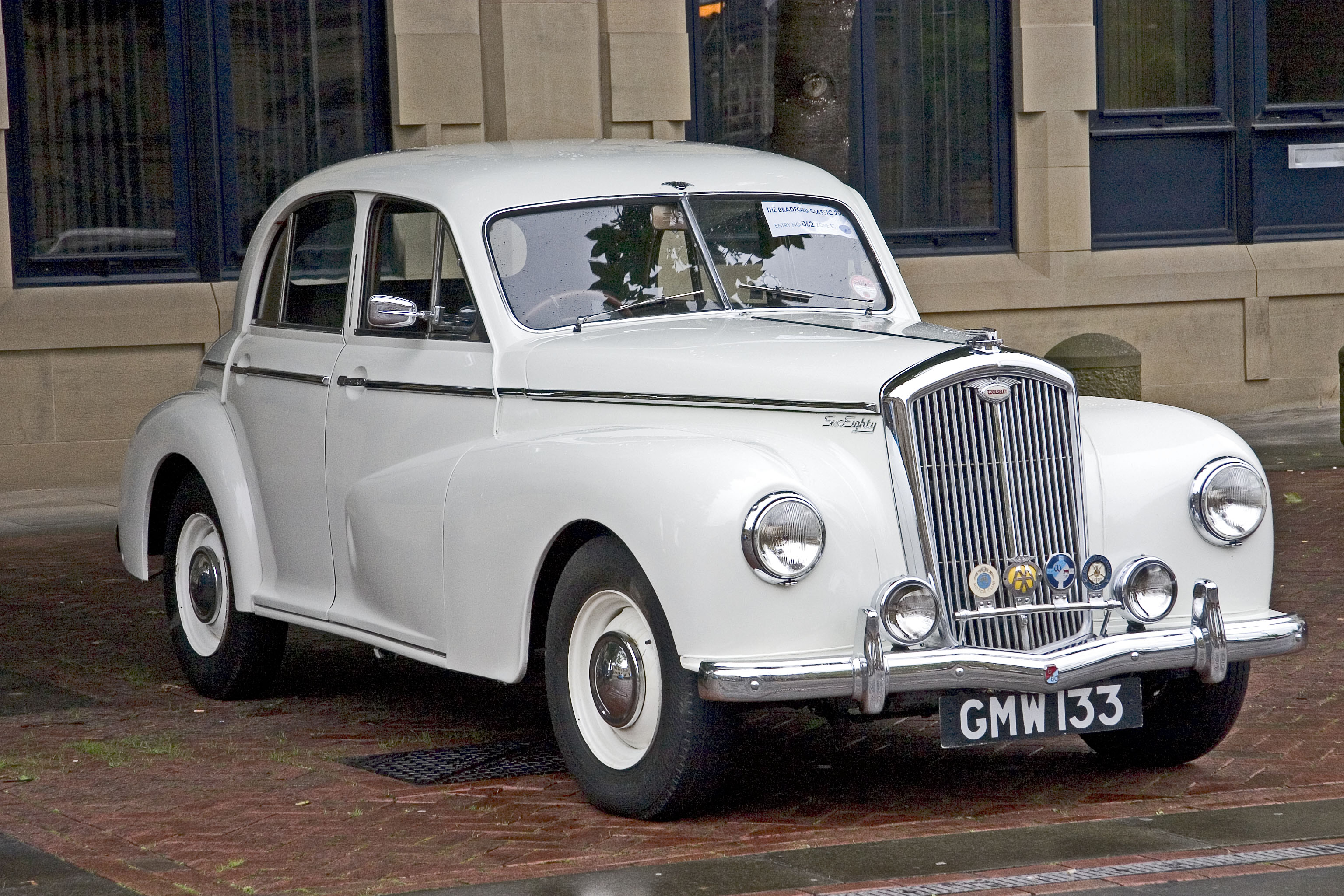
- Wolseley 6/80

Overview
- Manufacturer: Nuffield Organization; BMC
- Production: 1948–1954

Body and chassis
- Body style: 4-door saloon
- Layout: FR layout

The Wolseley 4/50 and similar 6/80 were Wolseley Motors' first post-war automobiles. They were put into production in 1948 and were based on the Morris Oxford MO and the Morris Six MS respectively. The 4-cylinder 4/50 used a 1476 cc 50 hp (37 kW; 51 PS) version of the 6/80 engine, while the 6/80 used a 2215 cc 72 hp (54 kW; 73 PS) straight-6 single overhead cam.

The cars featured a round Morris rear end and upright Wolseley grille and were used extensively by the police at the time – the 6/80 particularly.

These models were built at Morris's Cowley factory alongside the Oxford. They were replaced in 1953 and 1954 by the Wolseley 4/44 and 6/90.

== Wolseley 4/50 ==
Wolseley 4/50
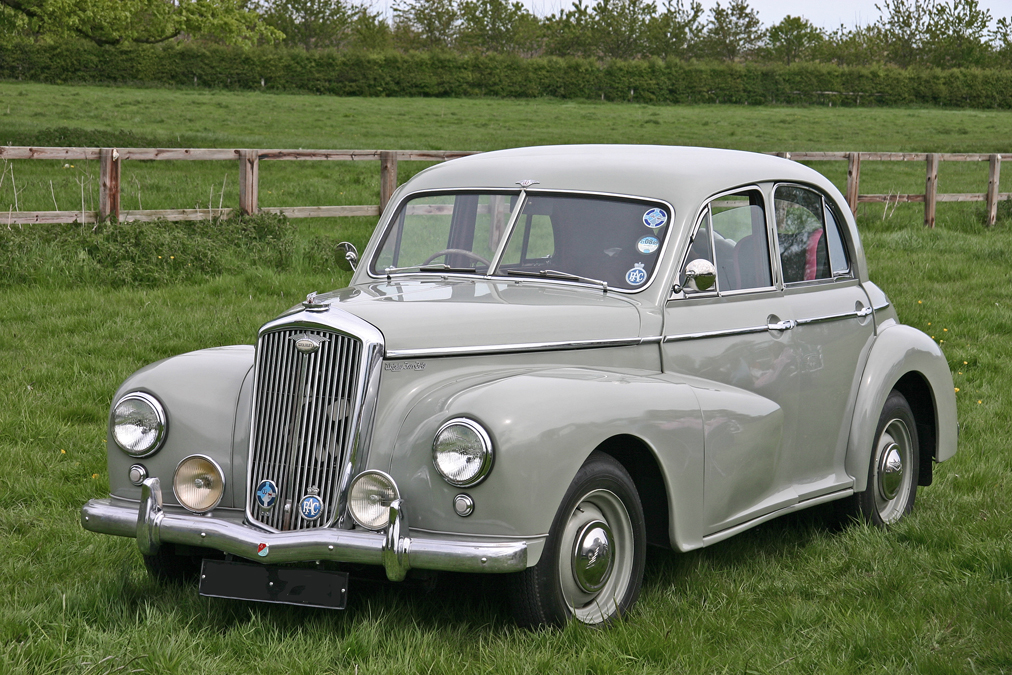

Overview
- Production: 1948–1953; 8,925 built
- Assembly: United Kingdom: Cowley, Oxford; Australia: Victoria Park

Body and chassis
- Body style: 4-door saloon
- Related: Morris Oxford MO

Powertrain
- Engine: 1476 cc OHC Wolseley Straight-4

Dimensions
- Wheelbase: 102 in (2591 mm)
- Length: 170 in (4267 mm)
- Width: 66 in (1676 mm)
- Height: 63 in (1,600 mm)

Chronology
- Predecessor: Wolseley 12-48; Wolseley 14–60; Wolseley 16-65
- Successor: Wolseley 4/44

A 4/50 tested by the British magazine The Motor in 1950 had a top speed of 70.7 mph (113.8 km/h) and could accelerate from 0-60 mph (97 km/h) in 30.3 seconds. A fuel consumption of 27.0 miles per imperial gallon (10.5 L/100 km; 22.5 mpg_{‑US}) was recorded. The test car cost £703 including taxes.

Sales volumes were only a third those of the car's six-cylinder sibling. The car was regarded as heavy, with "good use of the excellent gear-box" being needed to maintain a respectable pace. The Wolseley 4/50 was more upmarket and expensive than the Morris Oxford MO. The engine used was a 4-cylinder version of the 6/80. The pistons and doors were of very few common parts used in this range of cars. The snub-nose styling distinguishes it from the long bonnet of the 6/80 re.

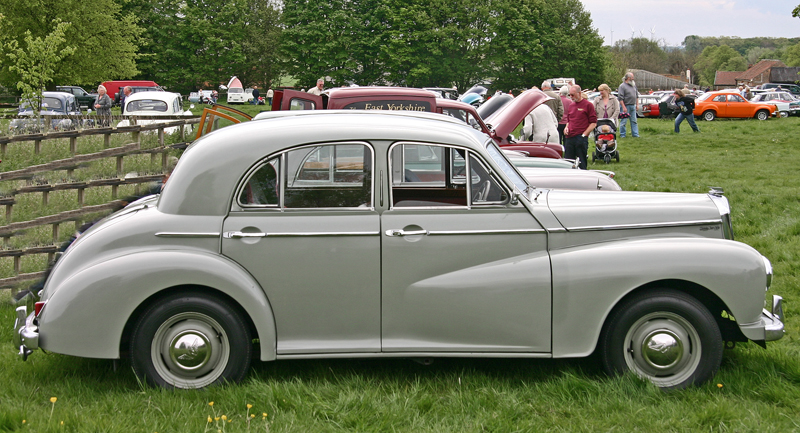
Wolseley 4/50 - side

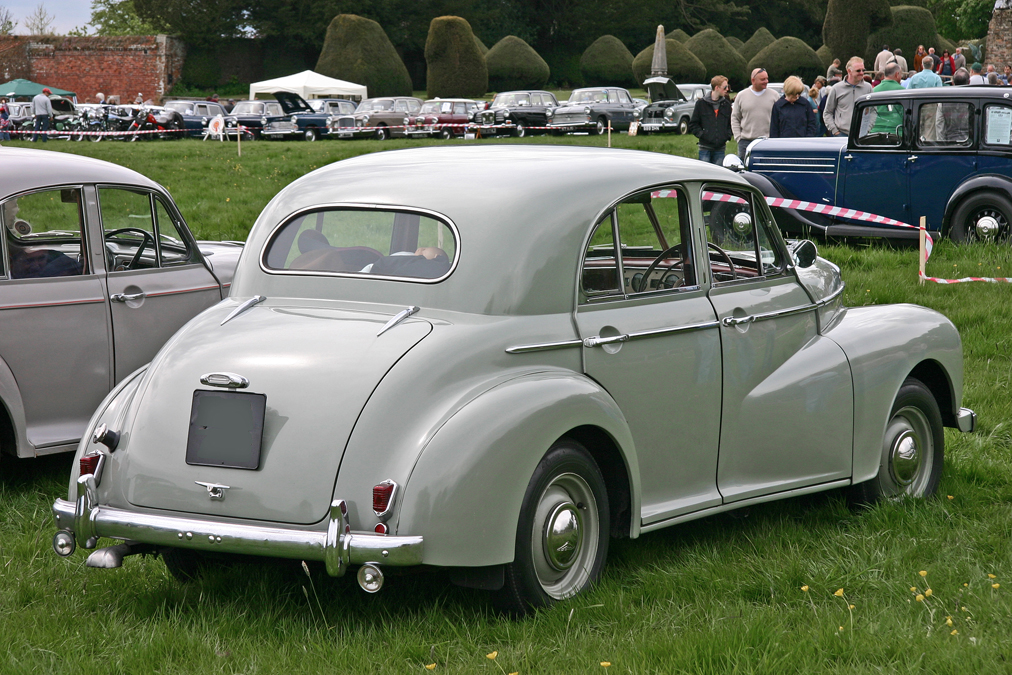
Wolseley 4/50 - rear

== Wolseley 6/80 ==
Wolseley 6/80
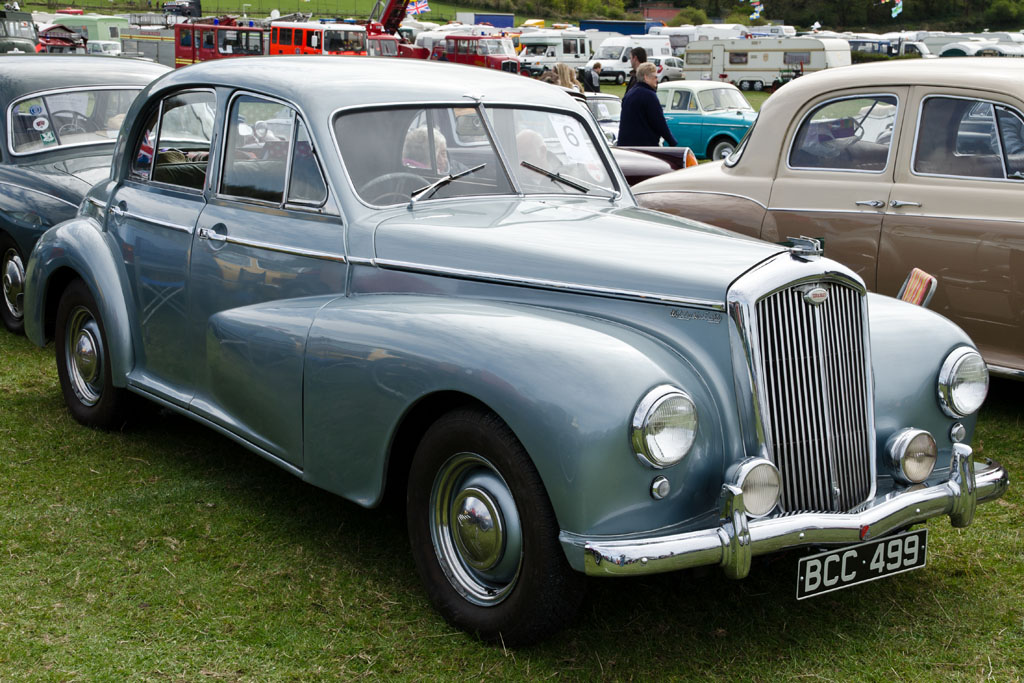

Overview
- Production: 1948–1954; 25,281 made
- Assembly: United Kingdom: Cowley, Oxford; Australia: Victoria Park

Body and chassis
- Body style: 4-door saloon
- Related: Morris Six MS

Powertrain
- Engine: 2.2 L I6

Dimensions
- Wheelbase: 110 in (2,794 mm)
- Length: 177 in (4,496 mm)
- Width: 66 in (1,676 mm)
- Height: 63 in (1,600 mm)

Chronology
- Predecessor: Wolseley 18/85; Wolseley 21; Wolseley 25
- Successor: Wolseley 6/90

To accommodate its larger six-cylinder engine, the 6/80 was 7 in (180 mm) longer than the 4/50. It also had larger brakes with 10 in (250 mm) drums compared with the 9 in (230 mm) ones of the 4/50.

The 'six eighty' was something of an anachronism, built in the traditional style that flagship Wolseley buyers loved, yet the underpinnings were intended to be almost cutting edge for an immediate postwar saloon. It had prewar style radiator, centre hinged bonnet, split windscreen, small oval rear window, and traditional elegant styling with a hint of running boards, and from inside the driver sat in leather seats and peered over the Wolseley hallmark of a polished wood dashboard, down a long high bonnet to the flying W symbol – all dated features by the early fifties, yet it had a monocoque chassis, springless torsion bar suspension, twin telescopic shocks, column gears and powered by a feat of engineering in the shaft driven overhead camshaft big 6. Wolseley had needed to produce a new postwar engine, and turned to their own past experience adapting designs drawn from an aero engine called the Wolseley Viper V8 that started life in WWI aircraft, latterly the Bristol SE5a, to which there is a visual similarity, the engine appearing quite vintage even for the day. However the formula worked for there's no doubt the 'six eighty' made a lot of money for Lord Nuffield's corporation, and was the longest ever running favourite of Police forces who seemed to retain cars well into the 1960s when they were a favourite for skid pan and mechanical training. They are even today recognised as the iconic period British police car.

— Postwar Vintage Marques that enraptured the public. Old Motor R.1999

A 6/80 tested by the British magazine The Motor in 1951 had a top speed of 85.3 mph (137.3 km/h) and could accelerate from 0–60 mph (97 km/h) in 21.4 seconds. A fuel consumption of 21.8 miles per imperial gallon (13.0 L/100 km; 18.2 mpg_{‑US}) was recorded. The test car cost £767 including taxes. An Autocar magazine road test of an apparently similar car managed a top speed of only 78.5 mph (126.3 km/h) and slightly slower acceleration on a windy day a couple of years earlier. The testers noted that "in keeping with [the manufacturer's] policy which has much to commend it to a discerning motorist, the Wolseley is quite high geared", which made for relaxed cruising at (by the standards of the time) speed, but a more urgent driving style involved extensive use of the gearbox. Standard equipment included a heater, a rear window blind and "twin roof lamps in the rear compartment".

A second-hand car review published in England in 1960 observed that "even the most junior member of the family" would recognise the Wolseley 6/80 as the "Cops' Car" both on television, and on the streets. The car was reckoned to offer a good power-to-weight ratio in combination with steering and suspension sufficiently robust to permit it to be "thrown around without detriment to the car and with little discomfort to the occupants". About 5,000 of the 25,281 examples built were exported to Australia, where the model was also assembled from complete knock-down kits.

=== Gallery ===
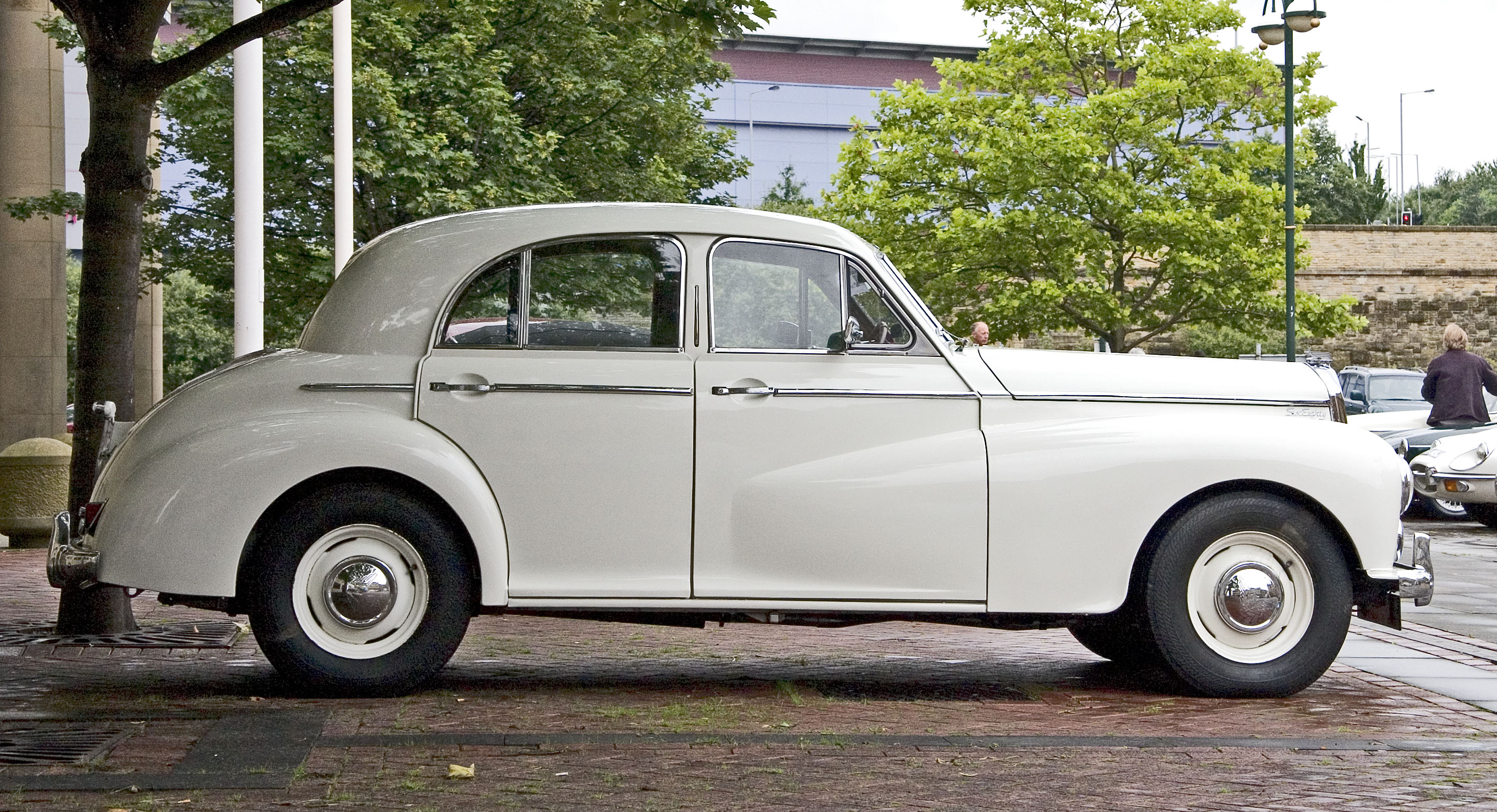
Wolseley 6/80 - side

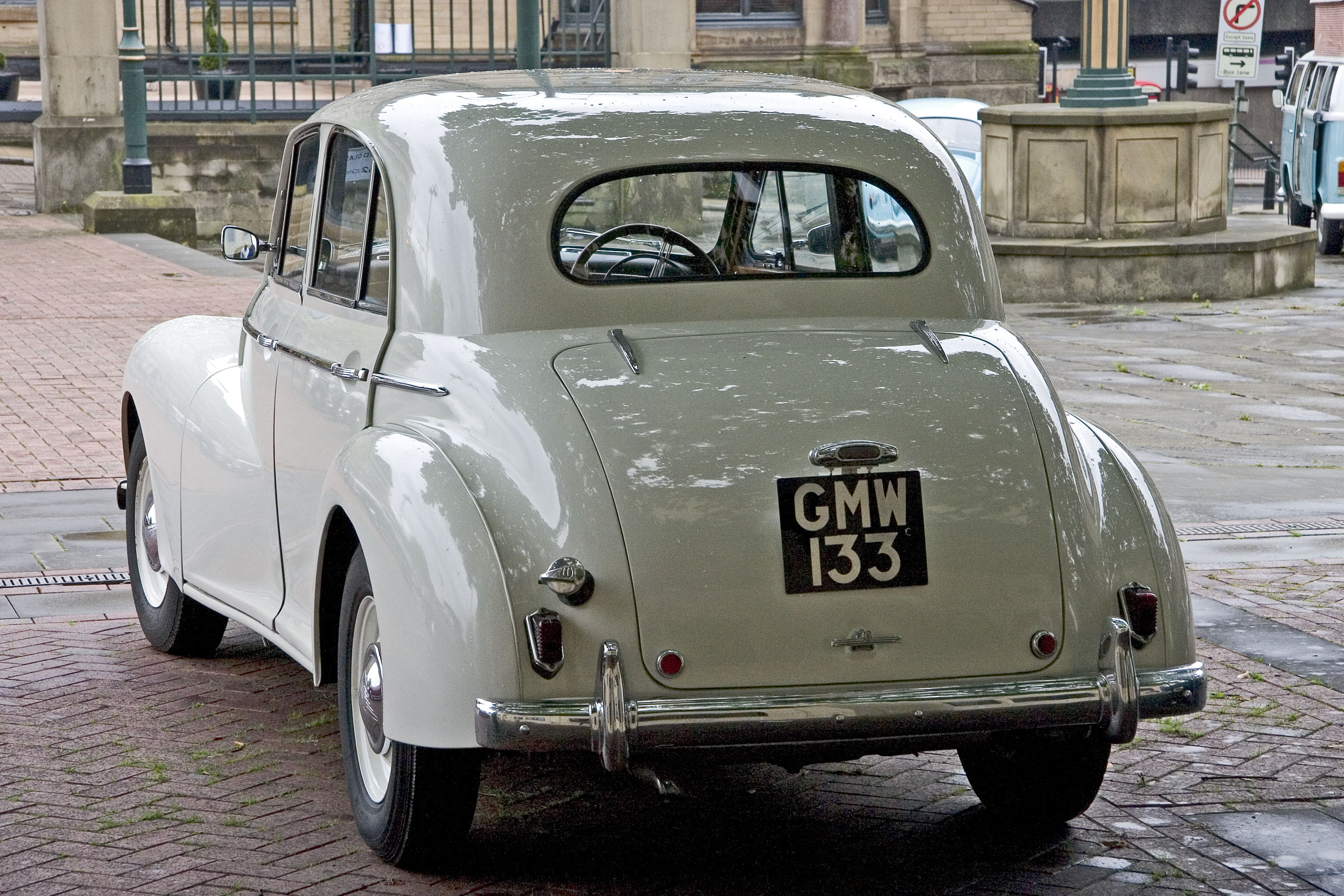
Wolseley 6/80 - rear
