= Leyland P76 =

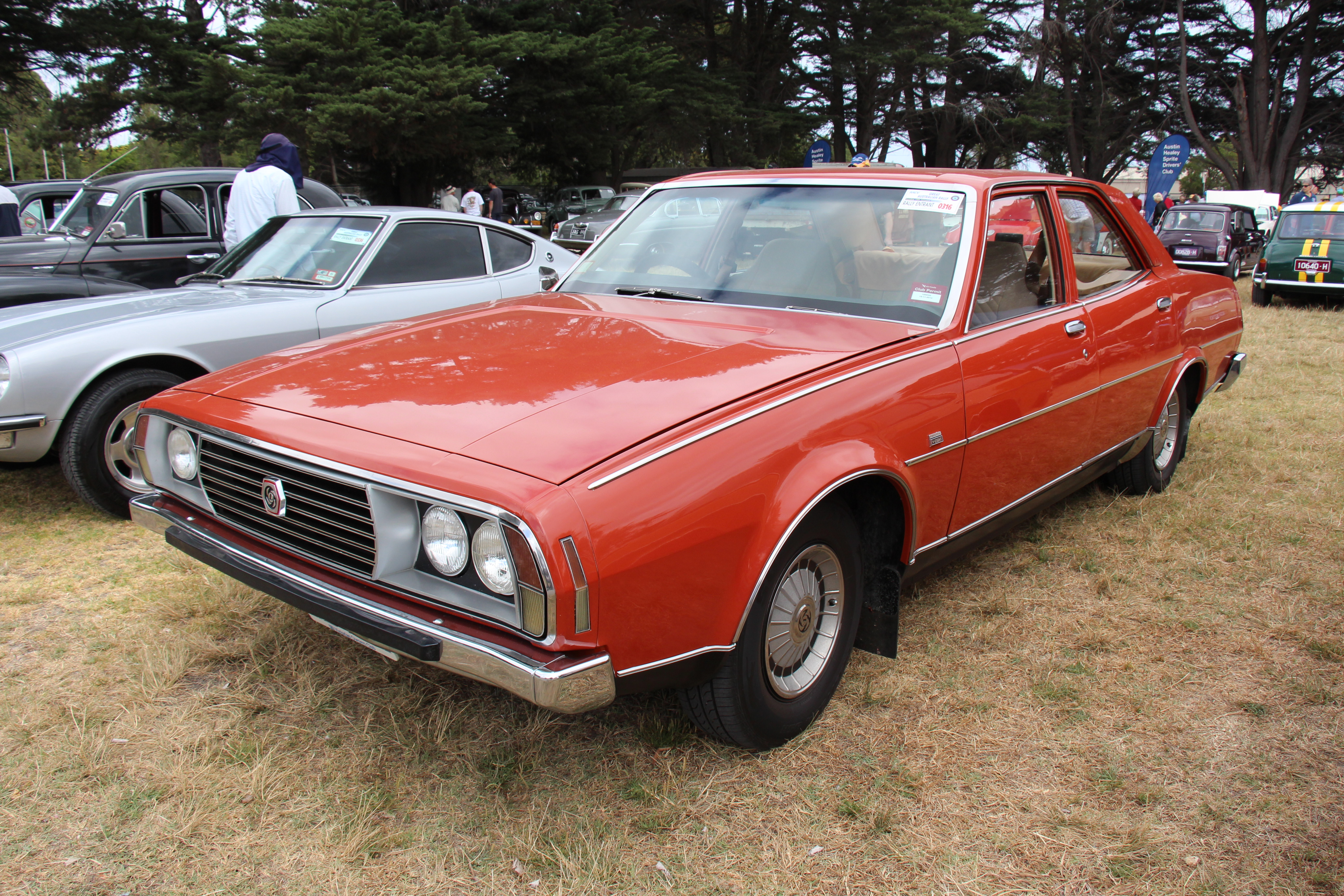
- Leyland P76 Executive

Overview
- Manufacturer: Leyland Australia
- Production: 1973–1976; 18,007 produced
- Assembly: Australia: Zetland, New South Wales; New Zealand: Petone (NZMC)
- Designer: Giovanni Michelotti; David Beech

Body and chassis
- Class: Full-size car
- Body style: 4-door sedan
- Layout: FR layout

Powertrain
- Engine: 2.6 L E-Series I6 (Australia only); 4.4 L Leyland Australia V8
- Transmission: 3-speed automatic; 3-speed manual; 4-speed manual

Dimensions
- Wheelbase: 2,826 mm (111.3 in)
- Length: 4,878–4,935 mm (192.0–194.3 in)
- Width: 1,910 mm (75 in)
- Height: 1,374 mm (54.1 in)
- Curb weight: 1,320 kg (2,910 lb)

Chronology
- Predecessor: Austin Kimberley/Tasman

The Leyland P76 is a large car that was produced by Leyland Australia, the Australian subsidiary of British Leyland. Featuring what was described at the time as the "standard Australian wheelbase of 111 inches", it was intended to provide the company with a genuine rival to large local models like the Ford Falcon, the Holden Kingswood, and the Chrysler Valiant. But, due to the first real fuel crisis and demand far exceeding the supply, Leyland rushed the assembly process with the first of the P76s to come off the assembly line, resulting in poor build quality and some reliability problems. The combination of the rushed assembly, fuel crisis and strikes at the component manufacturers' factories, resulted in the Leyland P76 being labelled a lemon, despite being named Wheels Car of the Year in 1973. By 1974, sales of the P76 had slumped and BMC decided to end the production of the P76. Although the P76 has been labelled a lemon in Australian motoring history, it is viewed by some as an iconic Australian car and has a loyal following.

In 1969, Leyland Australia was given the go-ahead to build a large car for Australia. At the time of the car's launch, it was reported that Leyland Australia had an accumulated deficit equivalent to £8.6 million, and had borrowed the same amount again in order to fund the development of the P76. The P76 was designed and built from scratch with a fund of only A$20m. This was also a decade of serious financial and operational challenges for parent company British Leyland back in Britain. Commercial success for this car was therefore seen as crucial to the survival of Leyland in Australia.

Launched in 1973, the P76 was nicknamed "the wedge", on account of its shape, with a large boot, able to easily hold a 44 gallon drum. Although station wagon and "Force 7" coupé versions were designed, these never went into mass production.

== Naming the P76 ==
The name of the P76 derived from the car's codename while in development (Project 76). The official line was that the P76 was an original Australian designed and built Large Family Car, with no overseas counterpart and that P76 stood for "Project 1976".

The Rover SD1 (released in 1976) shared several engineering features with the P76 – including MacPherson strut front suspension, the aluminium V8 engine and a live rear axle.

The P76 itself was, however, out of production by 1976. An alternative theory is that P76 were simply the first three digits of the army service number of Lord Donald Stokes, then chair of British Leyland.

== Automotive forebears ==
Before the P76, Leyland Australia and its corporate predecessor BMC (Australia) had not successfully fielded a direct competitor in the large-car sector which then dominated the Australian car market. Previous attempts had been mounted with the 1958 Morris Marshal (a rebadged Austin A95); the 1962 Austin Freeway and Wolseley 24/80 (the Freeway was an Austin A60 with Riley 4/72 tail lights, a unique full-width grille and a 2.4-litre 6-cylinder version of the 1622 cc B-series engine; the Wolseley was a 6-cylinder version of the Wolseley 16/60); and the 1971 Austin "X6" Tasman and Kimberley (facelifted Austin 1800 with the 6-cylinder 2.2-litre E-series engine).

Each of these cars was a compromise and the motoring public overwhelmingly preferred the locally established Holden and Ford products. Nonetheless, the Freeway, 24/80 and the X6 each developed a loyal niche following.

== Design and engineering ==
The car was designed by Giovanni Michelotti. The entry-level P76 featured an enlarged 2663cc 121 bhp (83 kW) version of the 6-cylinder engine from the smaller Austin Kimberley and Austin Tasman. The top-of-the-line 192 bhp (143 kW) aluminium 4416 cc V8 unit was unique to the P76, and was a derivative of the ex-Buick V8 that was powering the Rover 3500 and Range Rover. Leyland Australia cited a weight advantage approaching 500 lb (230 kg) for the P76, most of which was attributed to the lighter weight of the aluminium engine block when compared to the cast-iron blocks (with bigger displacements) of the V8s from Chrysler, Holden and Ford. It was hoped that the weight advantage would feed through into superior fuel economy and extended tyre life. Nevertheless, the car was a full-size car in Australian terms, for which class leading boot/trunk capacity was claimed.

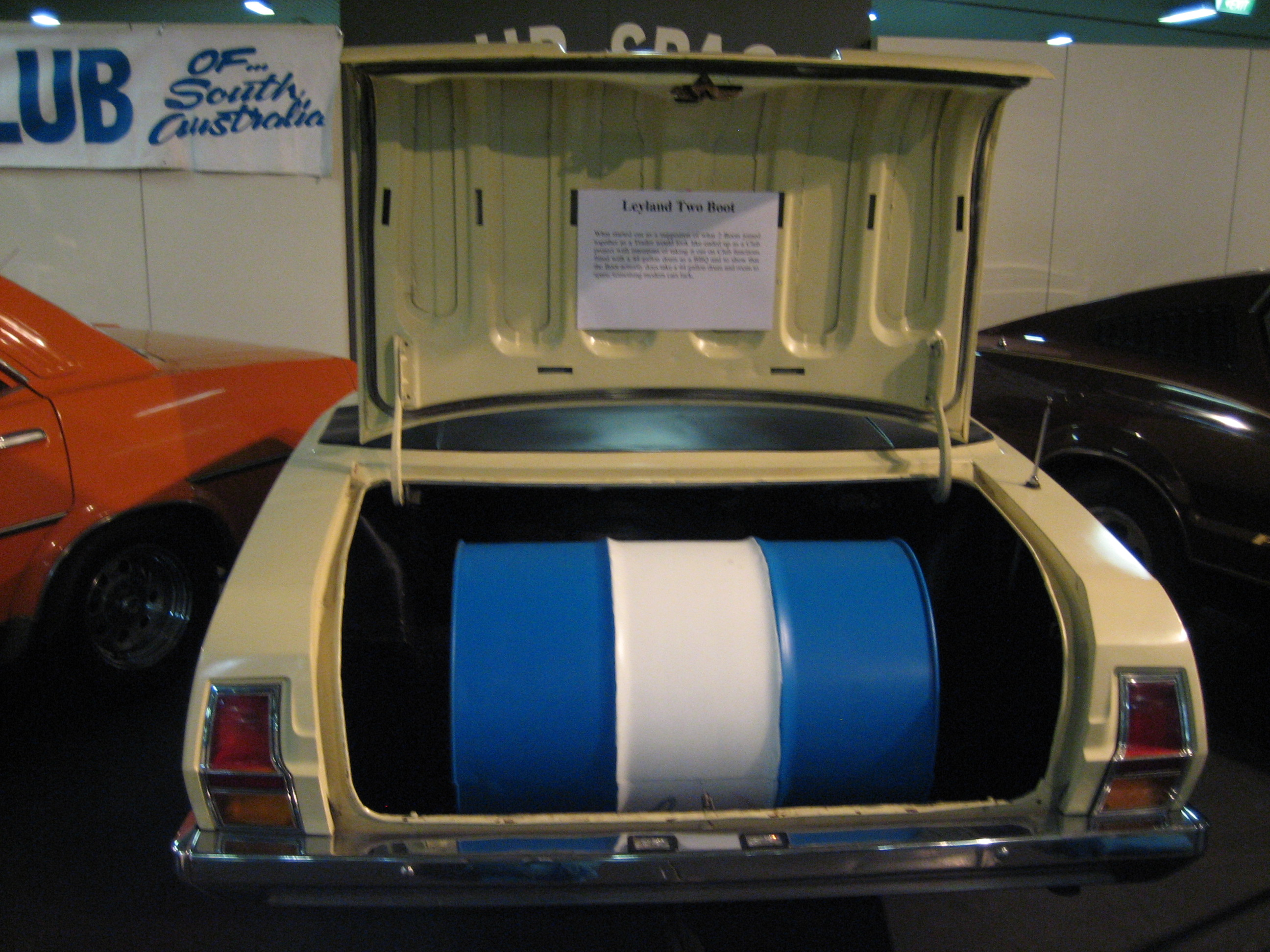
Leyland P76 with 44-gallon drum in the boot.

Safety equipment preceded the forthcoming Australian Design Rules, and featured front discs as standard on all models, recessed door handles and full-length side-intrusion reinforcements on all doors.

Transmissions for the car were all bought in from Borg-Warner Australia who were already also supplying transmissions to Ford and Chrysler.

Notwithstanding the advertising slogan ("Anything but average") the P76's engineering followed conventional lines.

It did offer a combination of features which were advanced in this category in Australia at the time: rack-and-pinion steering, power-assisted disc brakes, MacPherson-strut front suspension, front-hinged bonnet, glued-in windscreen and concealed windscreen wipers, as well as the familiar Australian-made Borg Warner gearboxes (including 3-speed column shift) and a live rear axle.

Particular attention was paid to structural rigidity, a British Leyland engineering strength. This goal was aided by a conscious effort to reduce the number of panels needed to build the car's body—a remarkably low 215, reportedly only five more than for a Mini.

At the time P76 production ceased, Leyland was developing a V6 version to replace the E6 variant. The V6 was derived from the 4.4-litre P76 V8, with the two rear cylinders chopped off.

== Performance in the marketplace ==
Despite the V8 model winning the Wheels Car of the Year for 1973, sales of the P76 were adversely affected by a variety of issues. The controversial new Labor government was fuelling rapid inflation; industrial action was affecting component manufacturers and production at Leyland Australia's plant in Zetland. Also, the release of the P76 coincided with the 1973 oil crisis, when fuel prices increased dramatically. As a result, demand for all larger cars subsided.

Hence, notwithstanding generally favourable press and public reaction to the car, sales did not reach expectations.

British Leyland announced plans to sell P76 in the UK. However, production ceased before these plans could come to fruition.

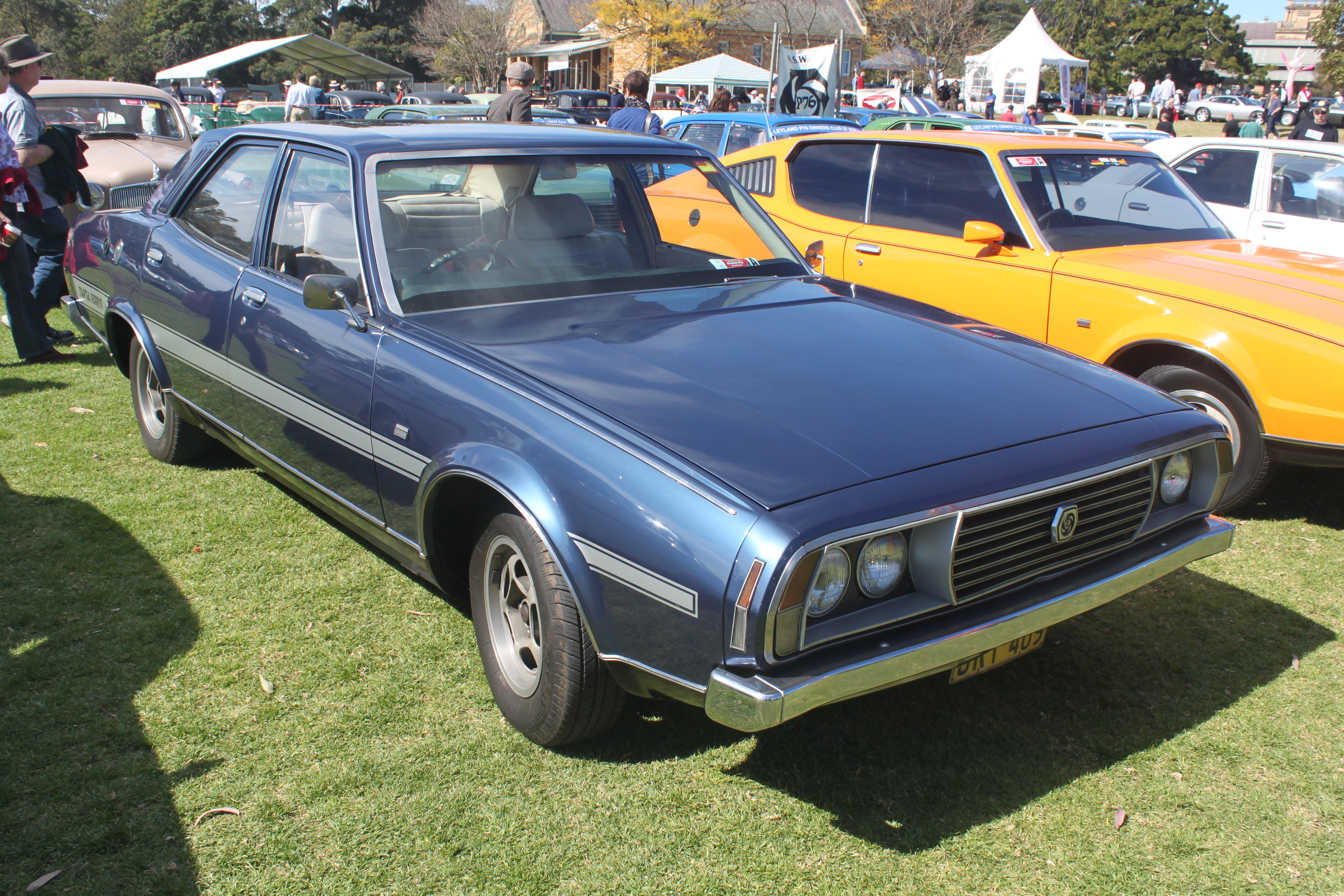
Leyland P76 Targa Florio

The car achieved success in the 1974 World Cup Rally—winning the Targa Florio section and placing 13th overall. Leyland Australia celebrated this victory by releasing a limited edition Targa Florio model: the V8 Super with a limited slip differential, sports wheels and steering wheel, as well as special paintwork, including side stripes.

Gerry Crown and Matt Bryson won the Classic Category of the 2013 Peking to Paris Endurance Rally and again in 2019 in their Leyland P76. Gerry Crown and Matt Bryson also finished Second on the 2015 Road to Mandalay classic car rally, winning the Malaysian Cup for being the fastest car.

== Unreleased P76 derivatives ==
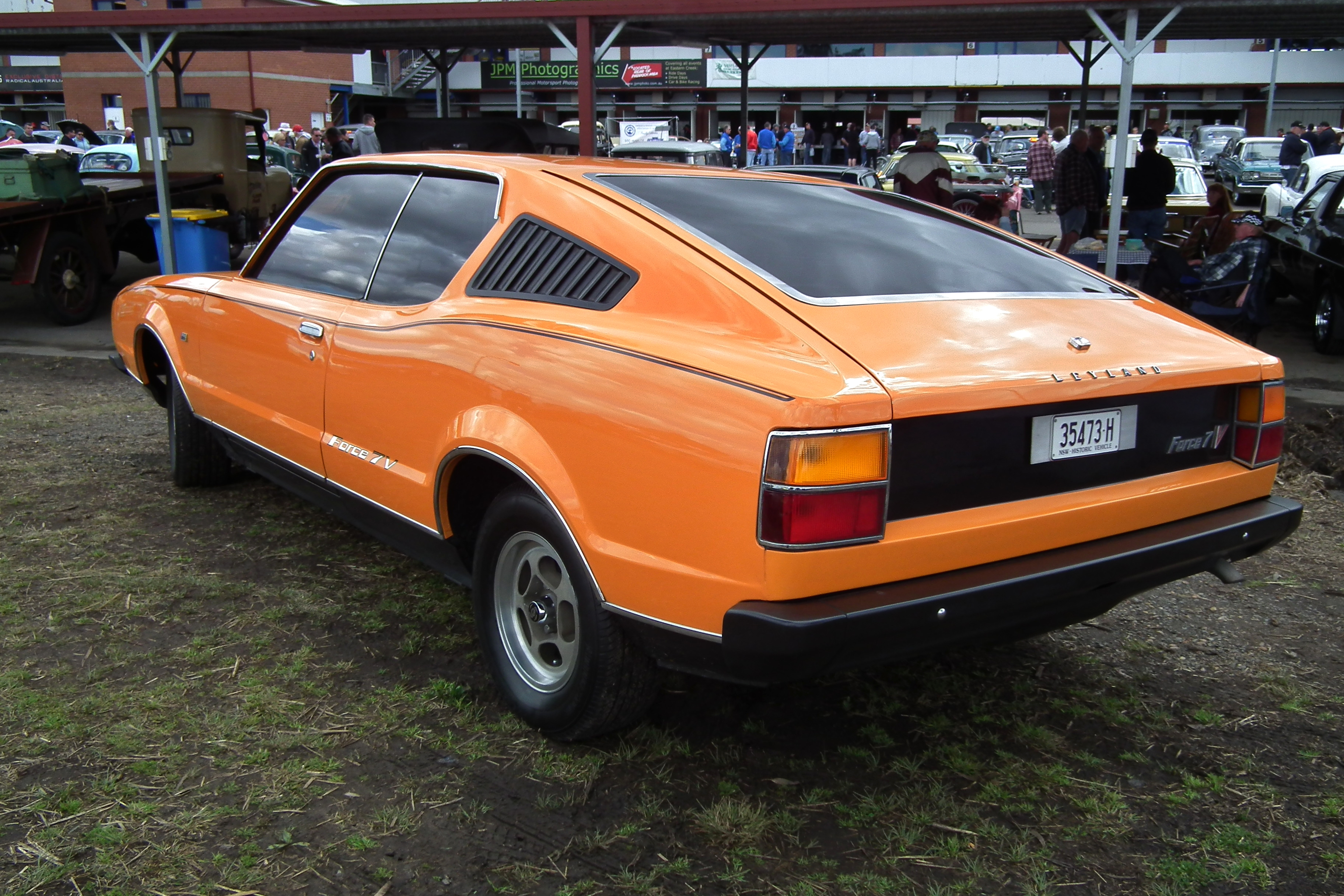
Leyland Force 7

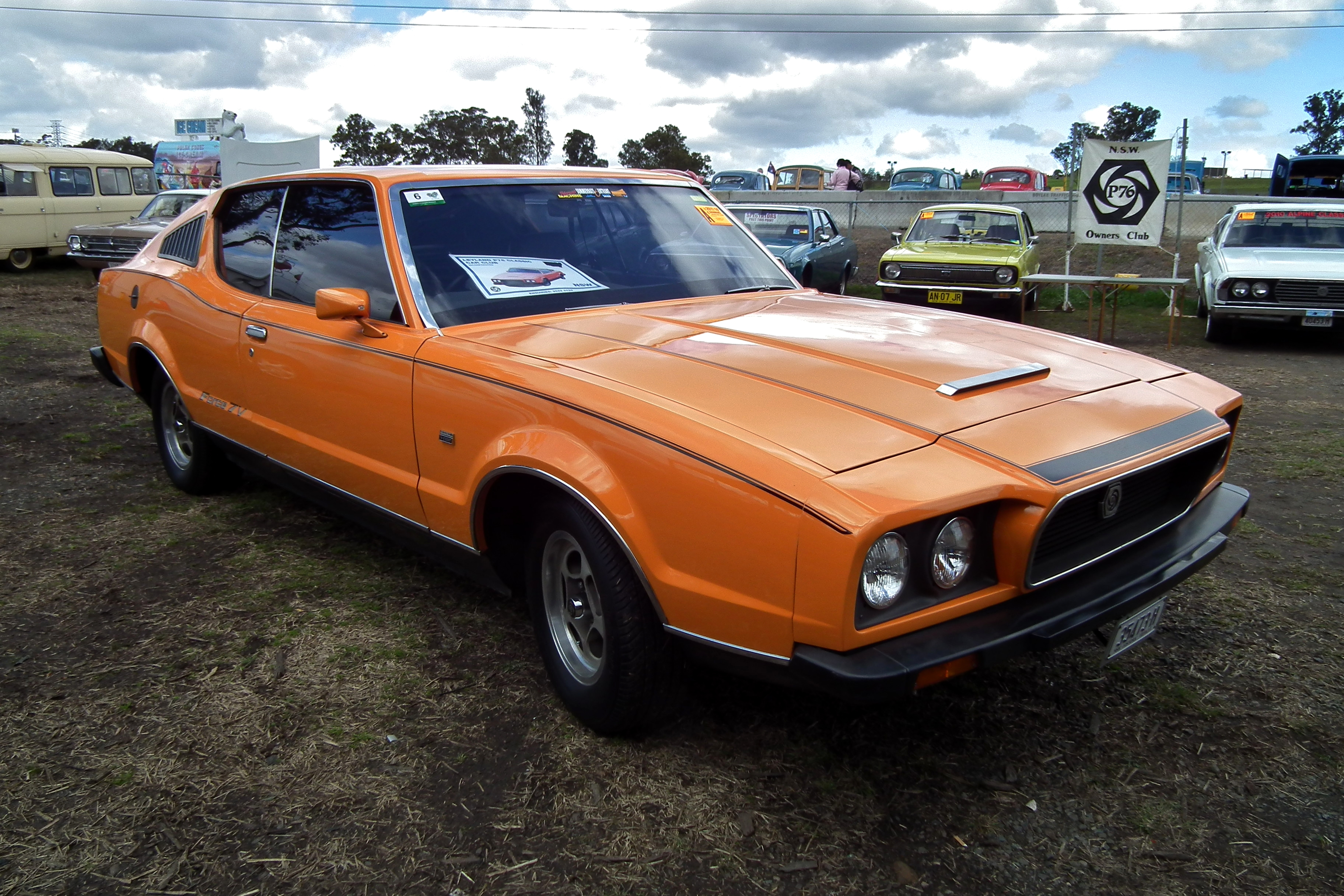
Leyland Force 7

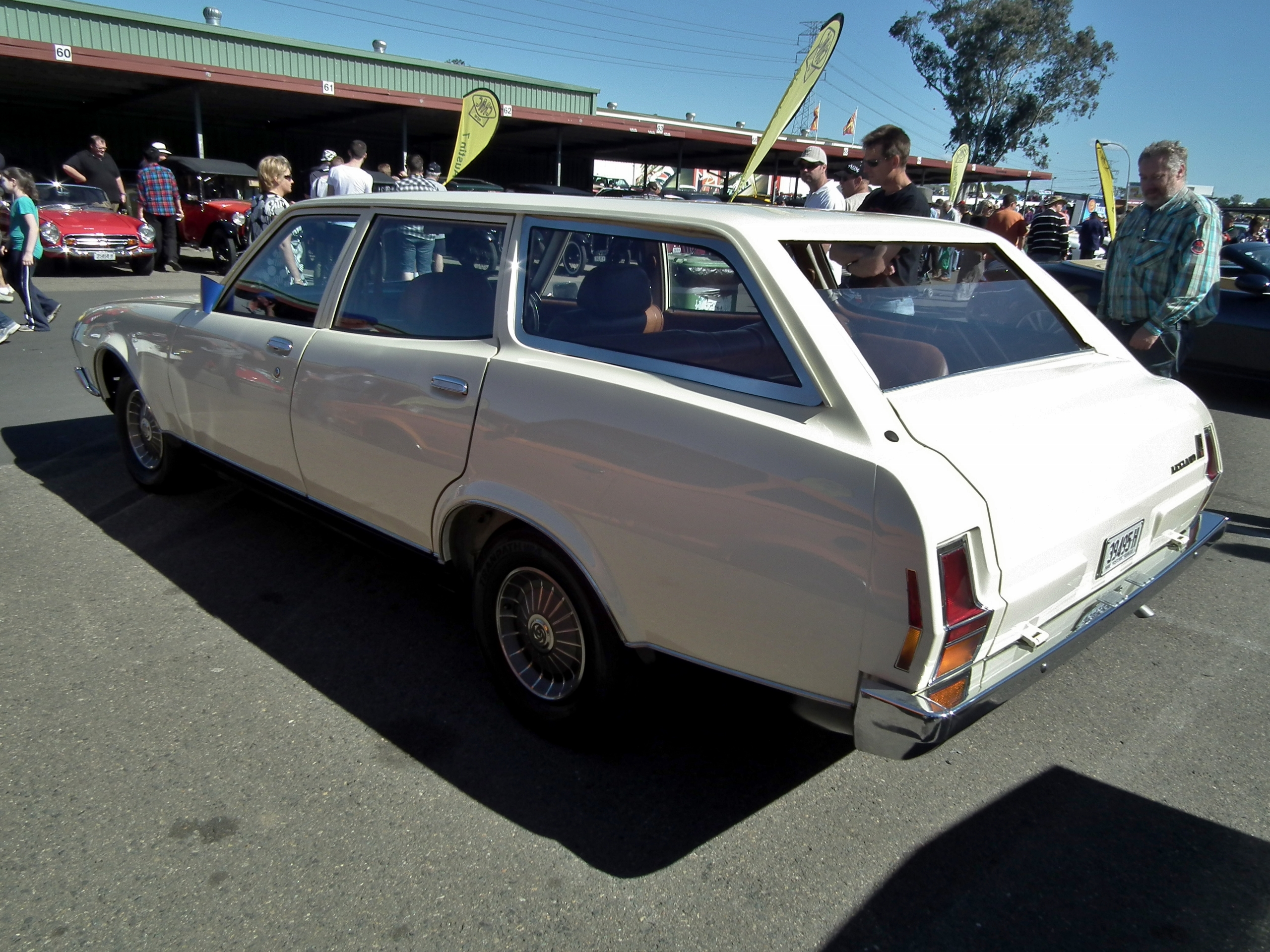
Leyland P76 wagon prototype

Although development had started much earlier – the Force 7 coupé was announced in 1974 but eventually only 10 pre-production coupés survived. By the time of the factory closure in 1974, one Force 7 was already in England for secret testing, Leyland Australia kept one example and finally donated that coupé to an Australian museum with some other components of the P76 production line and the remaining eight coupés were offered for sale to private buyers in an auction after the factory had closed. The handbooks had even been printed and were offered for mail order sale by the auctioneers. There was to have been a base six-cylinder Force 7, a more powerful Force 7V with the V8 unit, and a range-topping Tour de Force. All the surviving cars are the "mid" range Force 7V. It was unusual in that it had full seating for five adults and a large rear hatchback, the first of its kind produced in Australia. It shared few body panels with the sedan.

At the time of launch, the company announced the intention of introducing a station wagon/estate version later that same year, and at least three, prototype station wagons (estate cars), which shared much of the sedan's structure and body panels but with more upright rear door frames, were built: one was broken up by Leyland Australia for examination of the body strength, one was crash tested by Ford Australia for Leyland to gain part of the registration certification and the last and only surviving example was eventually used as a factory hack until it was sold at the same auction as the Force 7s as part of a pair of cars which included the last car made.

The wagon and the "last" car remain in private collections and the wagon is currently undergoing basic restoration. All of the coupés sold at auction did not have registration compliance plates fitted to them as final registration testing and approval had not been completed on either station wagon or coupe bodies. As of 2018, all 10 coupés and the single wagon had survived.

== New Zealand and the end of the line ==
The Leyland plant at Zetland closed in October 1974, and production of the P76 ceased, although CKD (completely-knocked-down) assembly continued in Petone, New Zealand, in exchange for NZ-assembled Rover P6s that were shipped to Australia. In New Zealand, the P76 was successfully sold in V8 form only in Deluxe, Super and Executive forms, until August 1976. Other P76s were imported into NZ as complete cars. NZ-built P76s can be identified by a 'Z' stamped onto the chassis plate immediately after the 076 model designation – i.e. 076Z. After production ended, surplus V8s were sold off by local distributor New Zealand Motor Corporation, and were popular as boat engines.

Leyland Australia produced 56 or more Force 7 coupés, the majority of which were crushed at the factory to enhance the value of the eight that Leyland auctioned in 1975. All of them still exist, and are regularly driven by their private owners. Another car, an Omega Navy one with white trim, was sent to Britain and used by Lord Stokes for some time. It was later sold to a private collector, who later sold the car to a collector in New Zealand, which is where it resides now. Another one is at the National Motor Museum, Birdwood in South Australia, on permanent loan from Leyland Australia.

After P76 production ended, it was reported that an unnamed Venezuelan company had expressed interest in buying the production line and build the car in that country, albeit with a different engine.

A smaller, medium-sized car was also planned, called the "P82". Styling for that car became a competition between Michelotti and Leyland Australia's own design department. In 1982, claims were made in some motoring media that Leyland in Britain had decided on Michelotti's version, but the ex-head of Leyland Australia's design department was unaware of any such decision. The car was intended to replace the Morris Marina in Australia, but only one prototype and some styling mock-ups were ever produced. At least two experimental V6 engines were made, one being based on a cut-down Rover V8 of about 2.6 L capacity, and another based on the actual P76 V8 motor at about 3.3 L. Conceived as a high volume/profit car, the P82 was supposed to have many body styles over the same basic structure, and was to be offered in 4, V6 and V8 forms, dependent on body style. After the Australian plant closed, the prototype car was reported to have been sent to Rover in Britain for examination before being destroyed. Just before the plant closure in 1974, and its subsequent takeover by the Australian military, Leyland Australia's styling department were still working on the P82 styling, and one single 1/5 scale clay model of the P82 survives, in the sedan "short front and rear" variant.

== P76 today ==
The P76 continues to have a loyal following of owners who have great enthusiasm for the car. There are at least seven P76 owners clubs in Australia and New Zealand. The New Zealand P76 Owners' Club was founded in 1983.

After production of the P76 ceased, Leyland Australia limited its local production to the Mini and Mini Moke, both produced at Enfield, along with commercial vehicles and buses.

== Total P76 production numbers ==
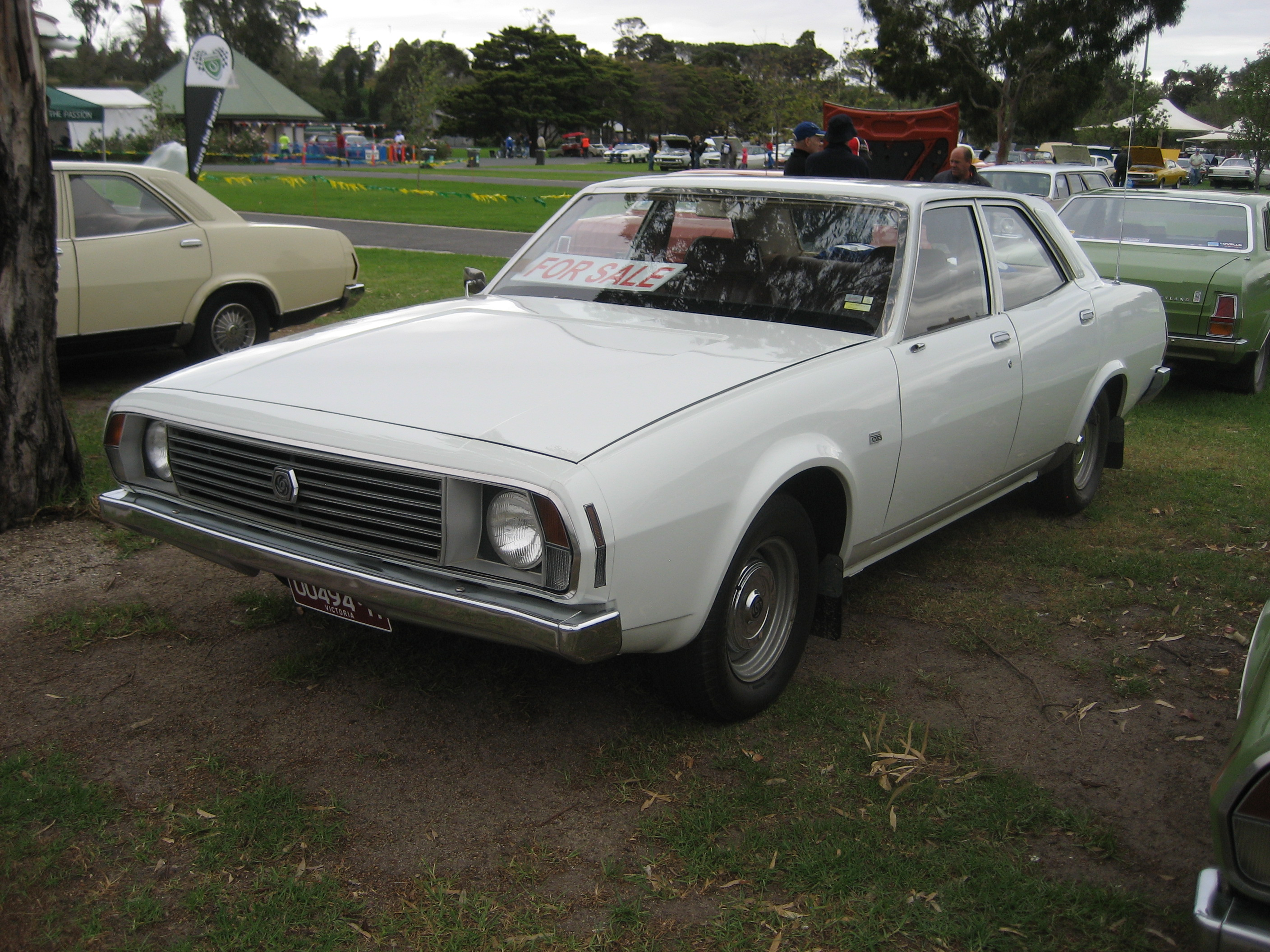
The base model P76 Deluxe was differentiated from the higher specification models by the use of two rather than four headlights

- Model, Version, (Model Code), Production
- Deluxe, Column Auto 6, (2C26) – 2118
- Deluxe, Column Manual 6, (2N26) – 2342
- Deluxe, 4 Speed Manual 6, (2M26) – 516
- Deluxe, Column Auto V8, (2C44) – 1532
- Deluxe, Column Manual V8, (2N44) – 1281
- Deluxe, 4 Speed Manual V8, (2M44) – 380
  - Deluxe Total – 8169
- Super, Column Auto 6, (3C26) – 1132
- Super, T-Bar Auto 6, (3A26) – 380
- Super, 4 Speed Manual 6, (3M26) – 719
- Super, Column Auto V8, (3C44) – 1928
- Super, T-Bar Auto V8, (3A44) – 2256 (including 488 Targa Florio model)
- Super, 4 Speed Manual V8, (3M44) – 1047
  - Super Total – 7462
- Executive, T-Bar Auto V8, (4A44) – 2376
  - Executive Total – 2376

Production Figures provided by James Mentiplay and the Leyland P76 Owners Club of WA.
