= BMC ADO17 =

Austin 1800 / 2200 Morris 1800 / 2200 Wolseley 18/85 / Six
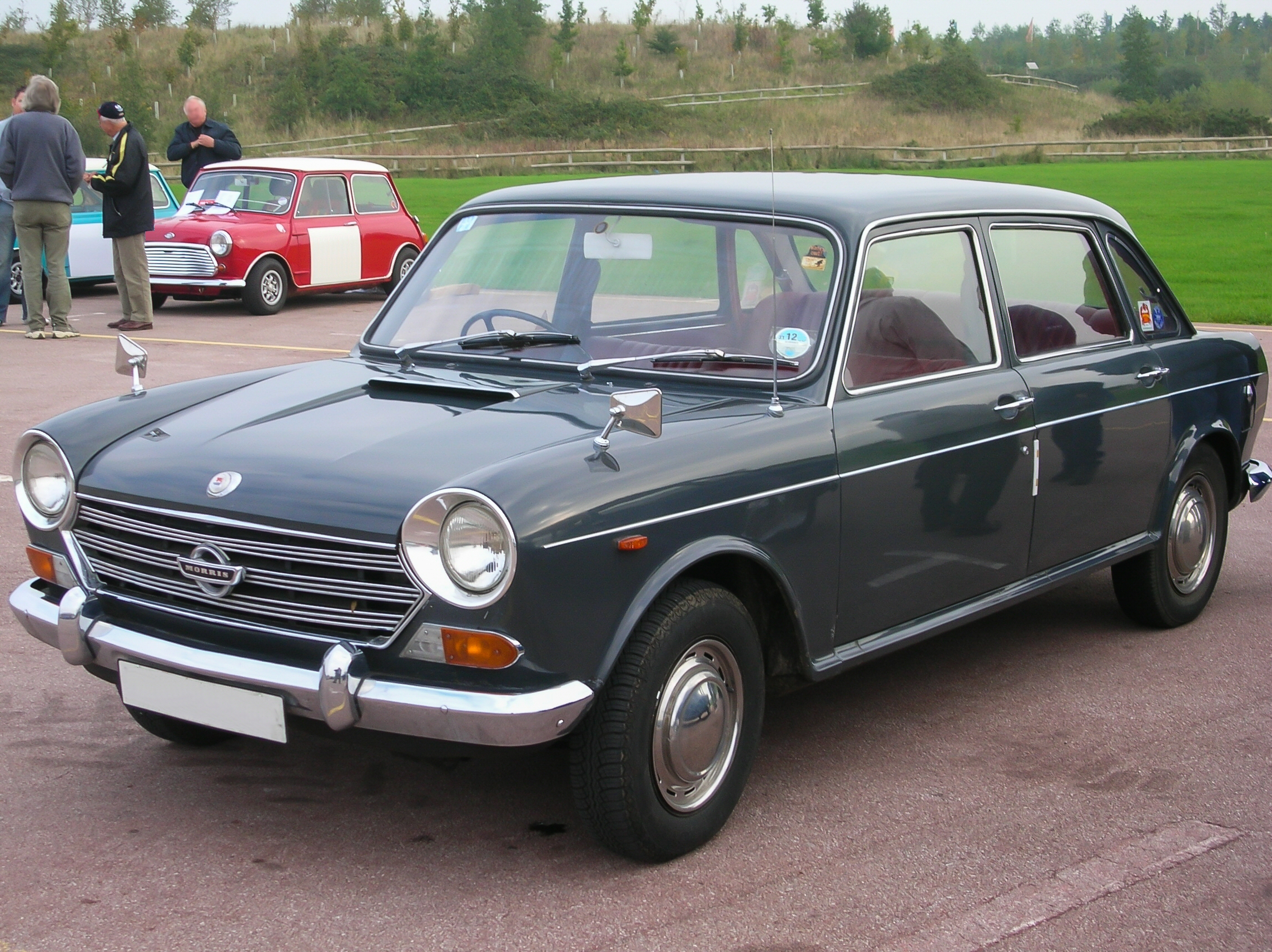
- 1970 Morris 1800 Mark II

Overview
- Manufacturer: BMC; British Leyland
- Also called: Austin Balanza; Austin Freeway; Austin Windsor; BMC Freeway; Morris Monaco
- Production: 1964–1975
- Assembly: United Kingdom: Longbridge, Birmingham (Longbridge plant); Australia: Newmarket, Queensland (Leyland Australia); New Zealand: Auckland; Petone (NZMC)
- Designer: Sir Alec Issigonis

Body and chassis
- Class: Large family car
- Body style: 4-door saloon 2-door coupe utility (Australia)
- Layout: FF layout
- Related: Austin Kimberley/Tasman

Powertrain
- Engine: 1798 cc B-Series pushrod Straight-4; 2227 cc E-series SOHC straight-6

Dimensions
- Wheelbase: 106 in (2,692 mm)
- Length: 165 in (4,191 mm)
- Width: 67 in (1,702 mm)
- Height: 55.5 in (1,410 mm)

Chronology
- Predecessor: Austin Cambridge; Morris Oxford VI; Wolseley 16/60
- Successor: Princess

BMC ADO17 is the model code used by the British Motor Corporation (BMC) for a range of front wheel drive cars in the European 'D' market-segment of larger family cars, manufactured from September 1964 to 1975. The car was initially sold under the Austin marque as the Austin 1800, then by Morris as the Morris 1800, and by Wolseley as the Wolseley 18/85. Later, it was marketed with a 2.2 L engine as the Austin 2200, Morris 2200 and Wolseley Six. Informally, because of the car's exceptional width and overall appearance, these cars became widely known by the nickname ‘Landcrab’.

The 1800 was voted European Car of the Year for 1965.

== Development ==
=== Mark I ===
The Austin 1800 was developed at BMC as a larger follow-up to the successful Mini and Austin 1100 under the ADO17 codename. (ADO was an abbreviation for Austin Drawing Office). Additional badge-engineered Morris 1800 and Wolseley 18/85 variants were launched in 1966 and 1967 respectively to cater for the BMC dealerships selling those marques. The 18/85 name had been used previously, on the Wolseley 18/85 of 1938 to 1948.

The car was unconventional in its appearance in 1964, with its large glasshouse and spacious, minimalist, interior including leather, wood, and chrome features, and an unusual instrument display with ribbon speedometer and green indicator light on the end of the indicator stalk. There was a chrome "umbrella handle" handbrake under the dashboard parcel shelf, and the two front seats met in the middle and could be used, on occasion, as a bench seat. Alec Issigonis and Pininfarina both worked on its exterior. The car's technical internals were also unconventional and ahead of their time, including Hydrolastic suspension and the use of inertia-controlled brake-force distribution by means of a valve which transferred braking force between front and rear axles as a function of sensed deceleration rather than as a function of fluid pressure. An interesting feature was a tail/brake/indicator night dipping system. A resistance circuit was connected in such a way so that when the sidelight circuit was energised, the resistors dimmed the tail/brake/indicator lights so not to blind or dazzle following drivers. The unitary bodyshell was exceptionally stiff, with a torsional rigidity of 18,032 Nm/degree.

Progressive improvement was a feature of most cars in this period, but the number and nature of the changes affecting the early years of the Austin 1800 looked to some as though the car had been introduced with insufficient development. In December 1964, a month after its launch, reclining front seats and the option of an arm rest in the middle of the back seat were added to the specification schedule. A month later, in January 1965, the final drive ratio reverted from the 4.2:1 ratio applied at launch to the 3.88:1 value used in the prototype: this was described as a response to "oil-consumption problems". At the same time, higher gearing and reduced valve clearances reduced the published power output by 2 bhp (1.5 kW), but cured the "valve-crash" reported by some buyers when approaching top speed on one of Britain's recently constructed motorways. The same month also saw the indicator switch modified. The manufacturer quietly replaced the "flexible, flat-section dipstick" which, it was said, had caused inattentive owners to overfill the sump after inserting the dipstick back-to-front so that the word "Oil" could not be seen on it.

Subsequent modifications included changing, repositioning and re-angling the handbrake in October 1965, removing the rear anti-roll bar and rearranging the rear suspension at the end of 1965, at the same time adjusting the steering to fix a problem of tyre scuffing, and fitting stronger engine side covers in January 1966, along with modified engine-mounting rubbers which were "resistant to de-bonding". February 1965 saw water shields fitted to the rear hubs, and the car's steering rattle cured by the judicious fitting of a spacer, while the propensity of early cars to jump out of first and second gears was solved by the fitting of a "synchroniser".

Further improvements followed the launch of the Morris 1800 early in 1966. Gear cables were revamped to deal with "difficult engagement" of first and third gears in cold weather, and the seat mountings were adapted to increase rake in May 1966.

In June 1967, without any fanfare or press releases, a modified version of the 1800 began to arrive at dealers, with repositioned heater controls, a strip of "walnut veneer" on the fascia, and separate bucket seats replacing the former split bench seat at the front. Other criticisms seem to have been quietly dealt with at the same time, including the fitting of more highly geared steering, which needed only 3.75 rather than 4.2 turns between locks, although the modification had applied to cars produced since September 1966 and, in the case of Australian cars, some time before that.

This was also the point at which the car received a differently calibrated dipstick, giving rise to rumours that engine problems on some of the early models had resulted from nothing more complicated than the wrong calibration of the dipstick, causing the cars to run with the wrong level of engine oil. The manufacturer insisted that the "recalibration" of the dipstick was one of several (unspecified) modifications, and urged owners not to use the new dipsticks with older engines.

A nickname of 'Landcrab' was given to the car by some car enthusiasts, derived from the car's unusual proportions; it was much wider and lower than most other cars in its class. The car's successful use in endurance rallies came about because, while the car was never particularly fast, its strong bodyshell and sophisticated suspension allowed it to reliably maintain competitive average speeds over long distances on poor roads. The car's stance, strength and slow-but-sure nature over rough ground put the BMC rally crews in mind of a terrestrial crab. The nickname stuck and became widespread in the press and public.

The ADO17's doors were later used on the Austin Maxi and larger Austin 3-Litre models, as well as on the Panther De Ville.

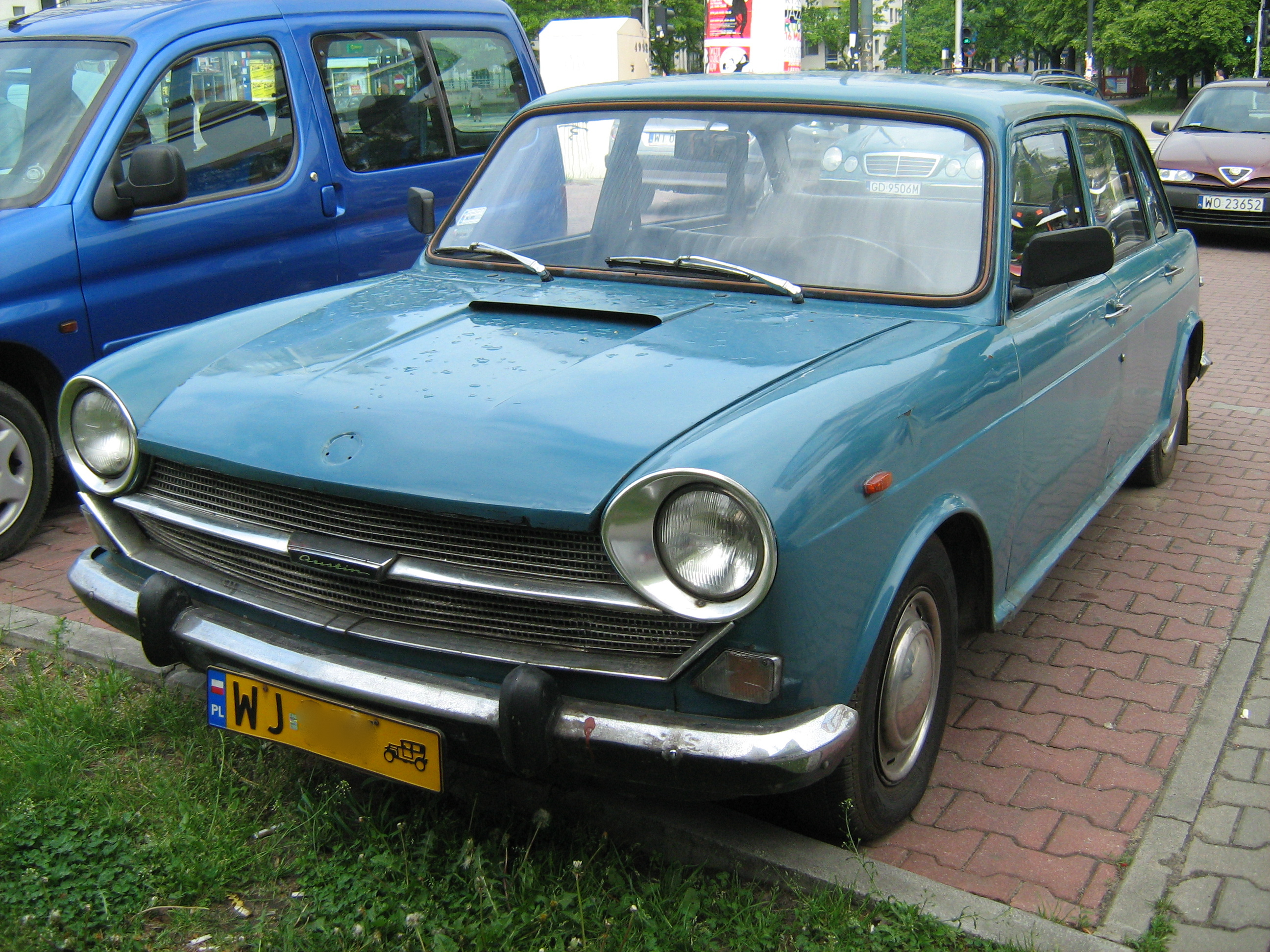
Austin 1800 (Mark I)

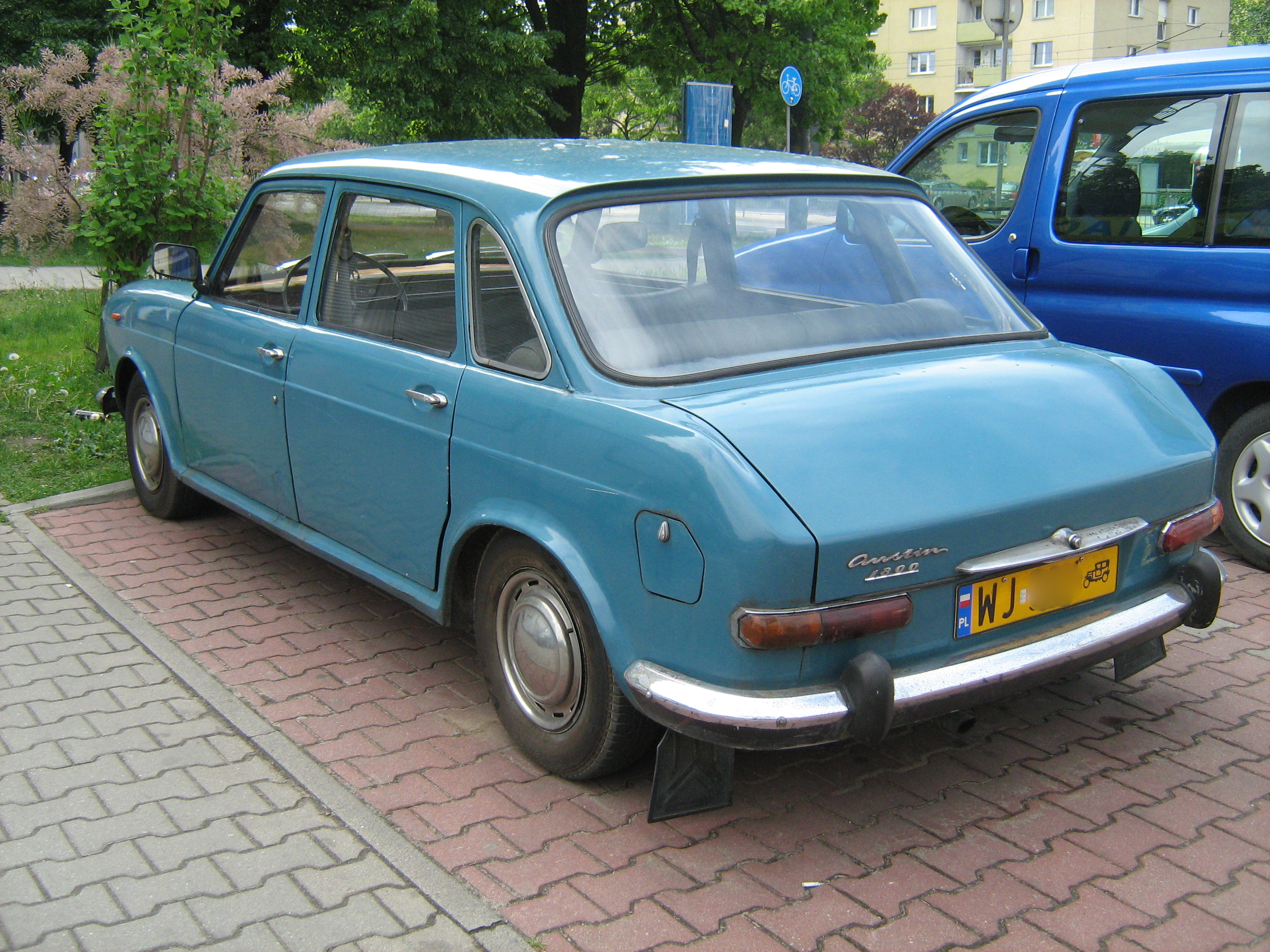

=== Mark II ===
In May 1968, a Mark II version was launched. This featured a cheaper and more conventional interior, revised front grilles and other trim, and for the Austin and Morris models the slim, horizontal rear lights were replaced by vertical "fin" lights which gave a family look along with the smaller ADO16 range. The Wolseley retained its unique rear lights. Other changes included a higher second gear and final drive ratio for the manual transmission, and conventional suspension bushes replaced the far superior roller bearings fitted to the Mark I. The compression ratio was increased and maximum power output boosted by 5 bhp to a claimed 86 bhp. The Mark II also had larger wheels.

In 1969, the sills and doors from the 1800 (with Mark II exterior handles) were used on the bodyshell of the otherwise new Austin Maxi; apart from that, both models have little interchangeability.

The 1800S twin carburettor 95 bhp engine came in from October 1968. By 1970, a 97 bhp (72 kW) "S" model with twin SU HS6 carburettors, a 120 mph speedometer and sporty-looking badging was available.

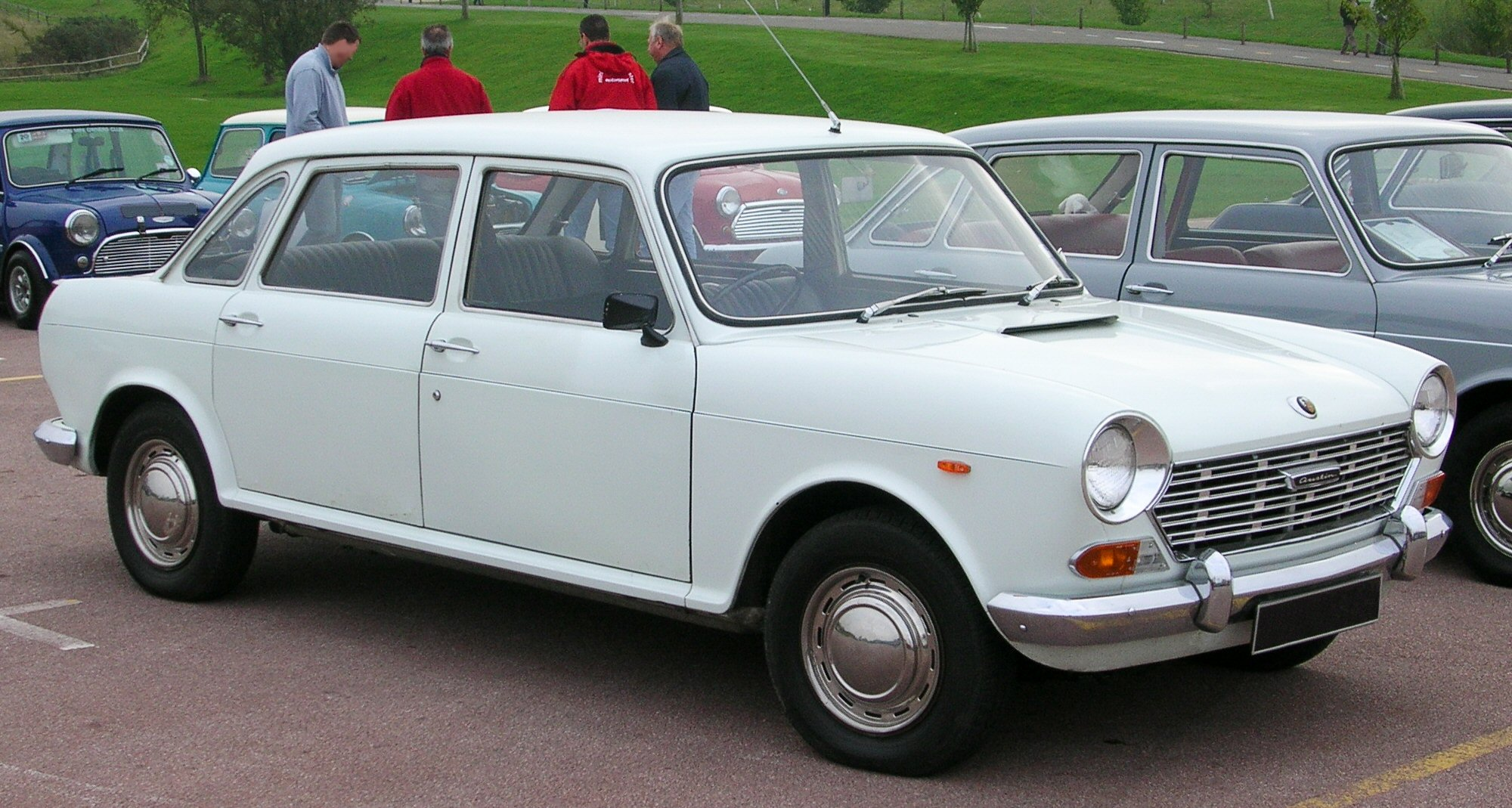
1969 Austin 1800 Mark II

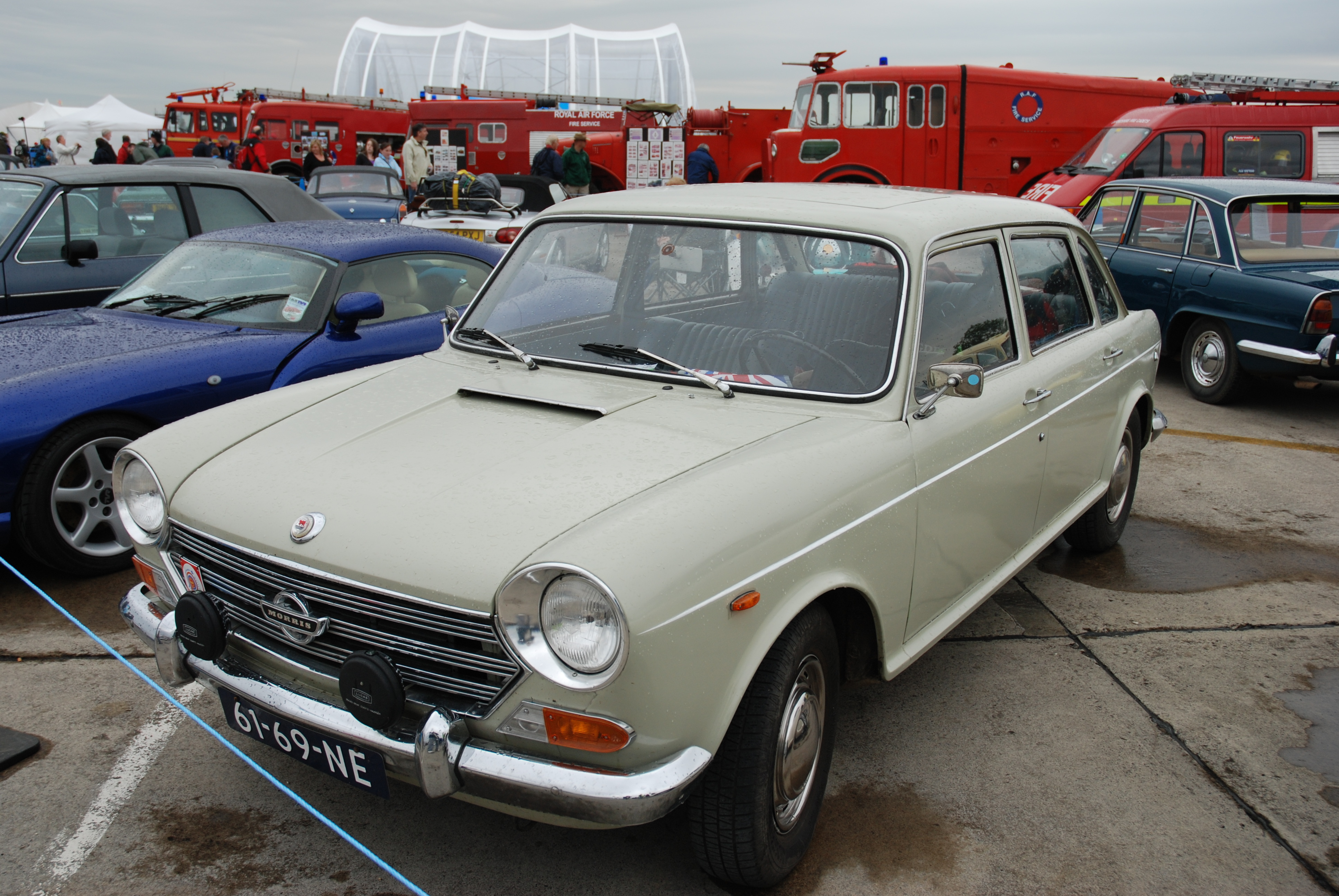
Morris 1800 Mark II

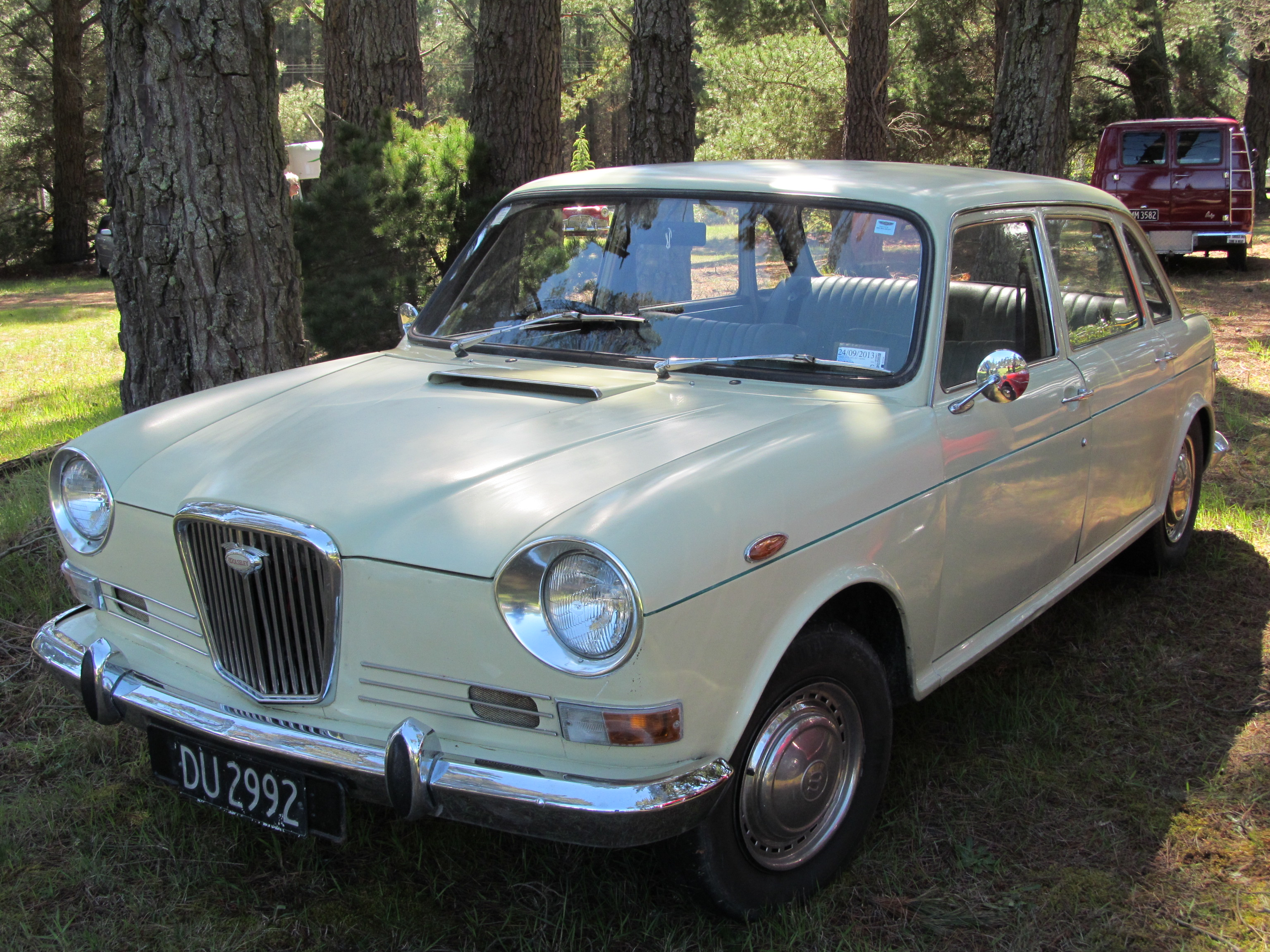
1969 Wolseley 18/85 Mark II

=== Mark III ===
Further, less dramatic modifications heralded a Mark III version in 1972. This had another change to the front grille (now a shared style for the Austin and Morris) and interior improvements, including a conventional floor-mounted handbrake. At this point, six-cylinder versions were introduced – the Austin 2200, Morris 2200 and Wolseley Six. While 1800 versions of the Austin and Morris were continued, the Wolseley 18/85 was dropped.

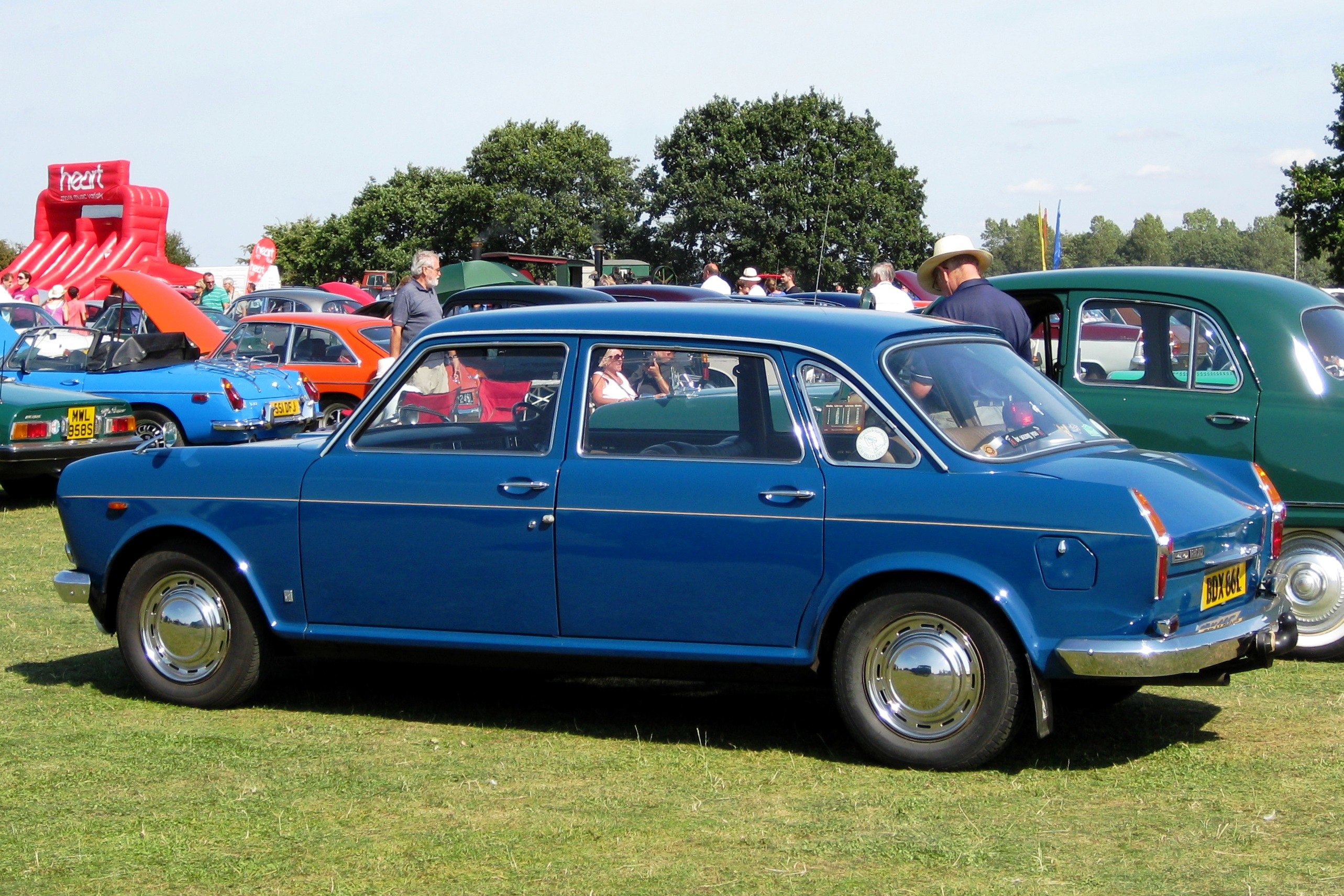
Austin 1800 Mk III

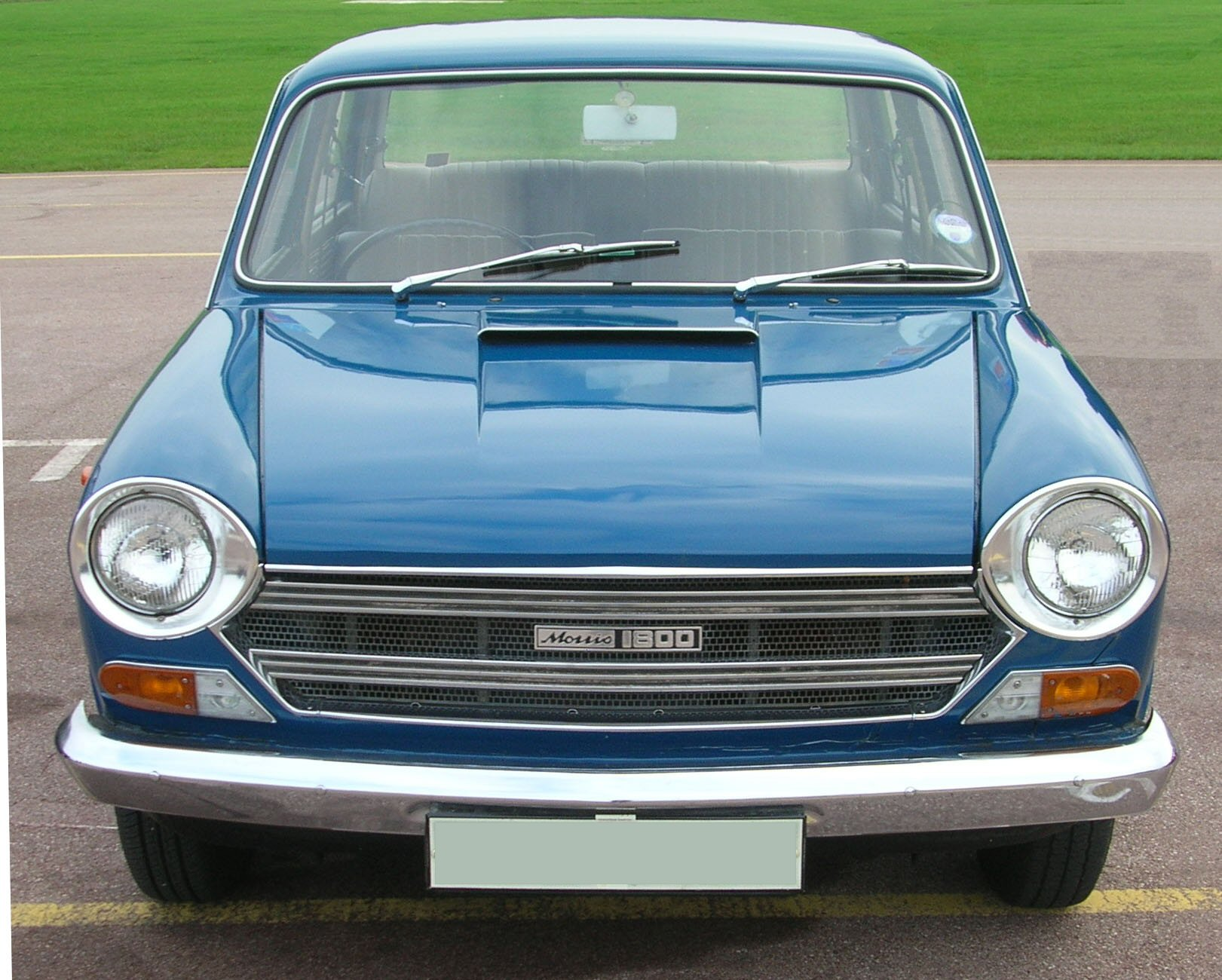
1972 Morris 1800 Mark III

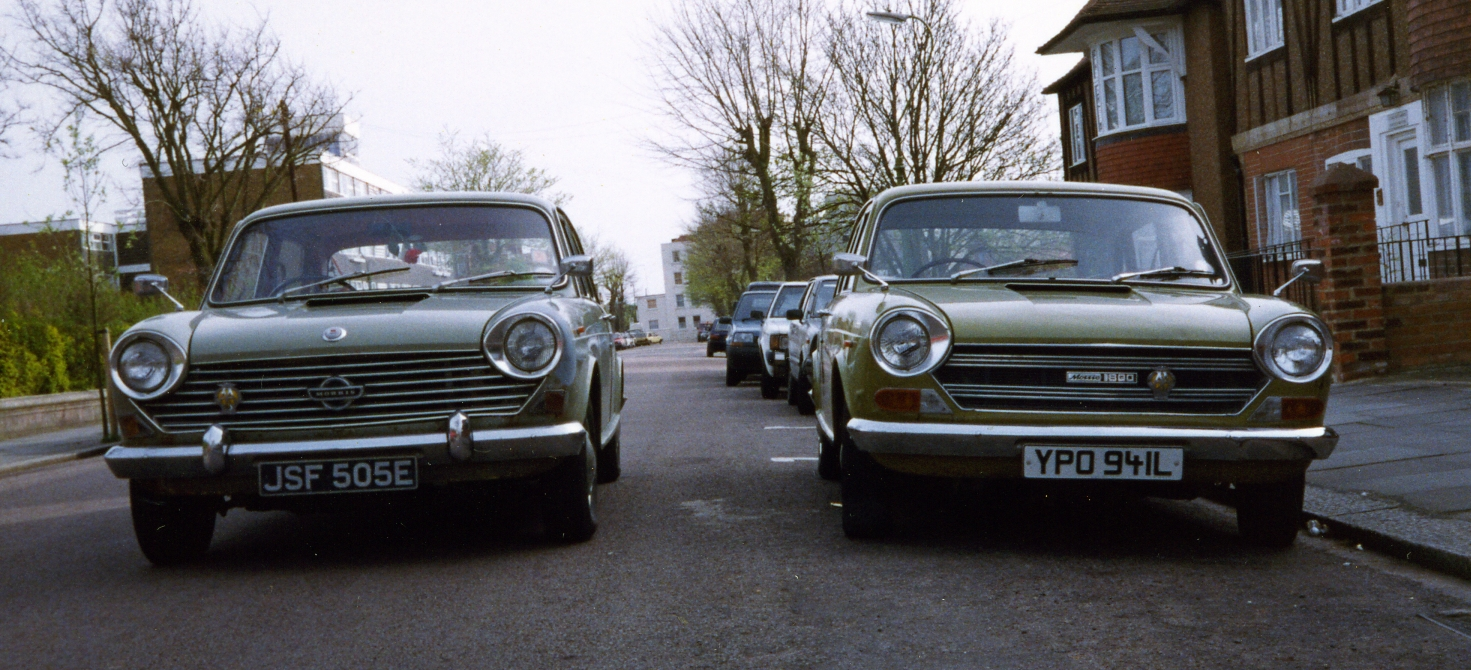
Morris 1800 Mark I (on left) and a later Mark III model; front comparison view

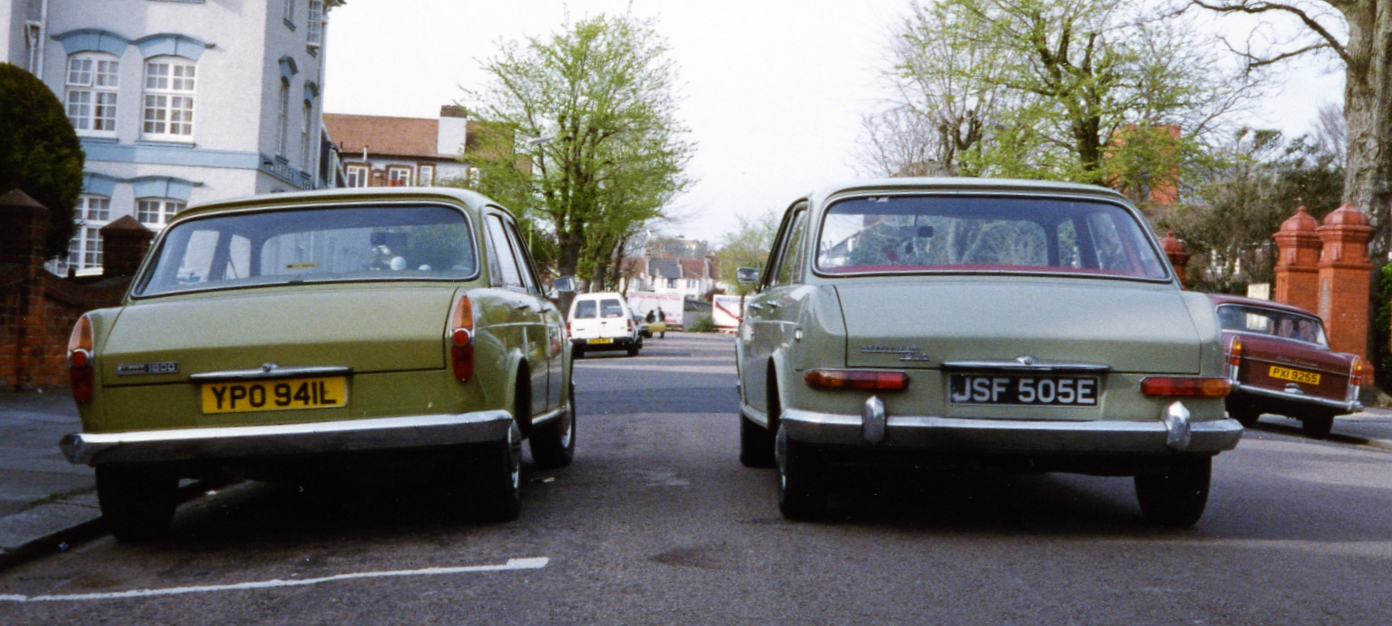
Morris 1800 Mark I (on right) and a later Mark III model; rear comparison view

== Home-market 6-cylinder models ==
The 2.2-litre straight-six engine used in the Australian Austin Tasman & Kimberley "X6" cars was introduced into the British ADO17 range in 1972. The British 6-cylinder models were marketed as the Austin 2200, Morris 2200 and Wolseley Six.

The ubiquitous doors even appeared on the further upmarket Austin 3-Litre of 1968 and, at prototype stage, Bentleys and Rolls-Royces.

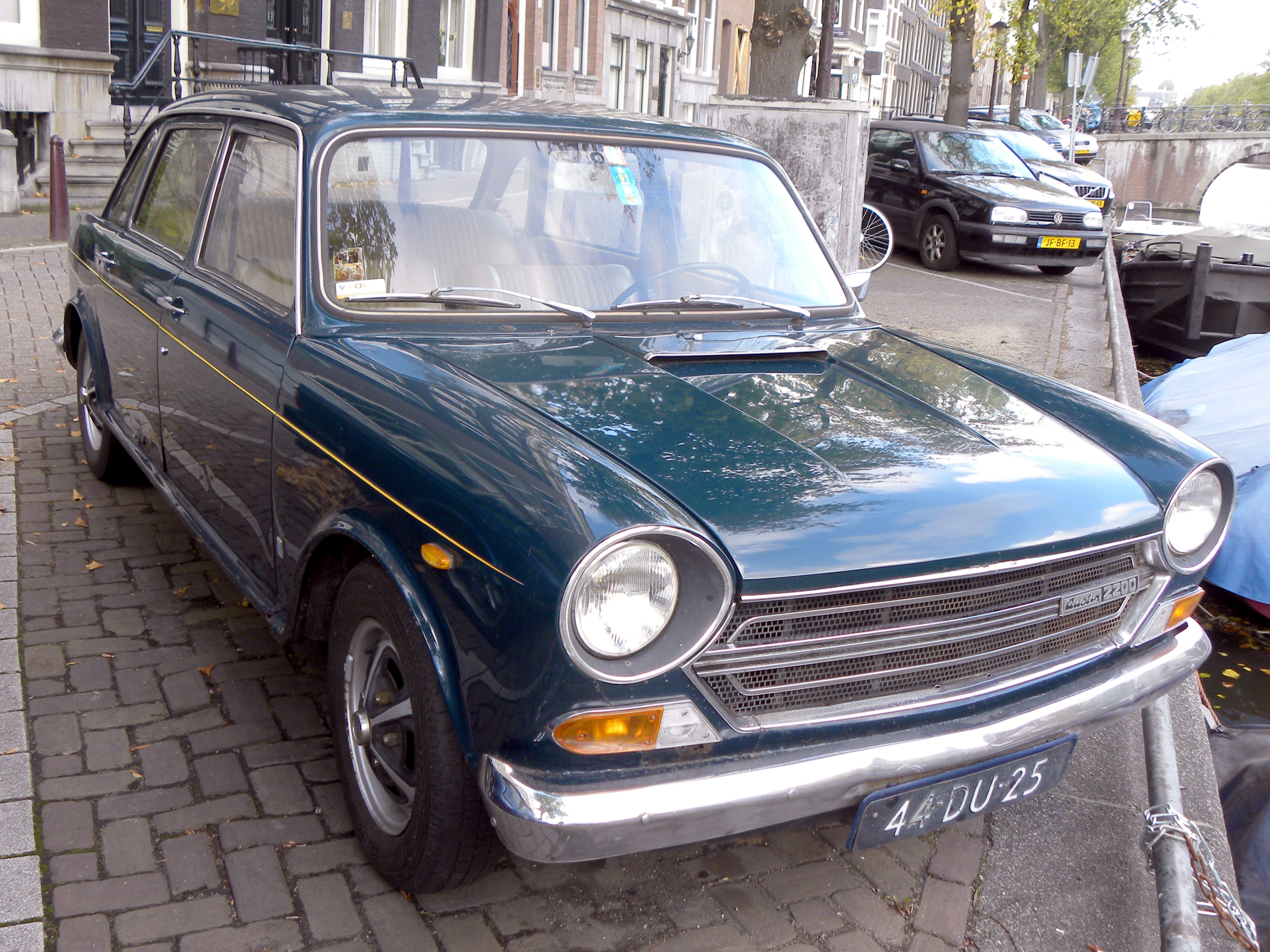
Austin 2200

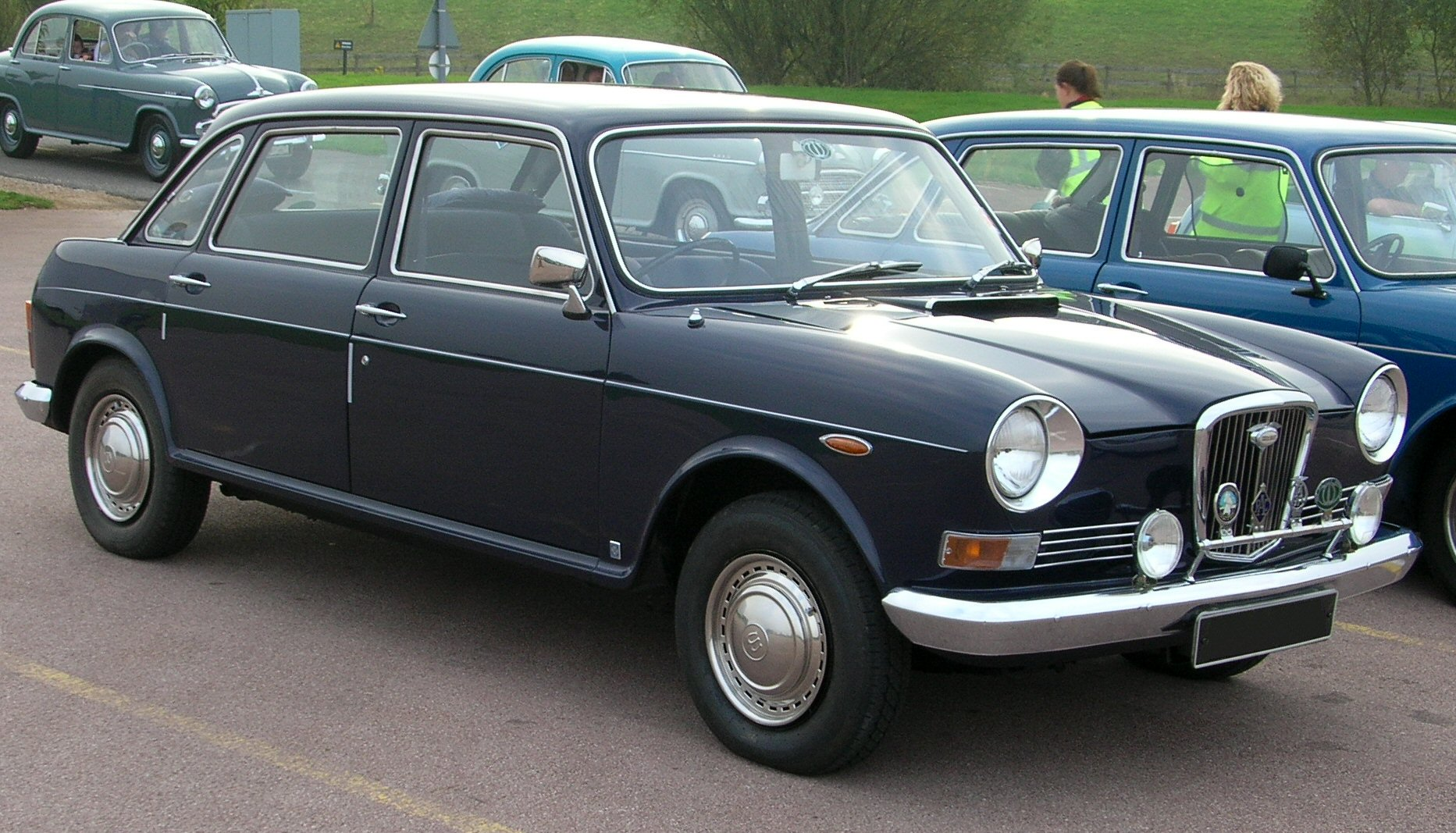
Wolseley Six

== Sales ==
Some 386,000 examples of all variants were produced in just over a decade, with the Austin-badged versions being the most common; some 221,000 units were produced. There were 95,271 Morris 1800 and 35,597 Wolseley 18/85 produced in the UK. Relatively few have survived outside the hands of enthusiasts owing to its original unfashionable image, and more recently, its popularity in the demolition derby and banger racing scenes, owing to the bodyshell's exceptional strength and rigidity.

In early 1975, all three models were replaced by the wedge-shaped ADO71, or 18–22 series, which bore the Austin and Morris (1800 and 2200) names, while the Wolseley variant had no official model name save for being marketed as "the Wolseley saloon". From late 1975, all ADO71 models were marketed under the Princess name and the Wolseley marque was discontinued.

== Motorsport ==
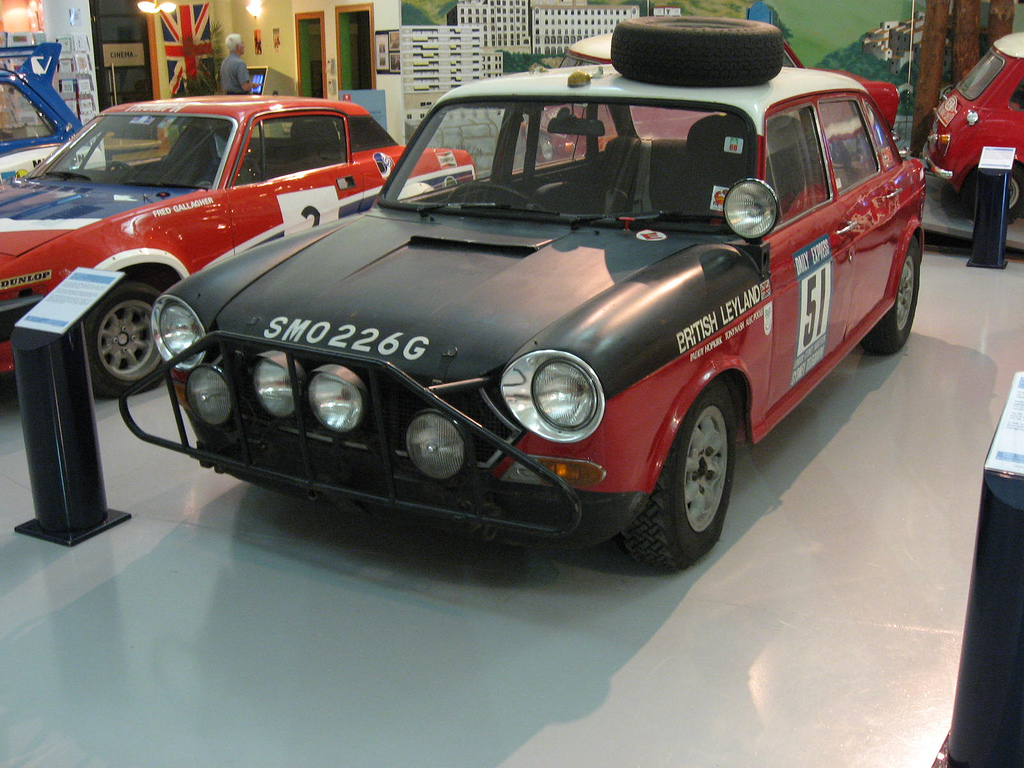
The "BMC 1800" which placed second in the 1968 London-Sydney Marathon

The model proved a strong competitor in endurance rallying, finishing second in the 1968 London-Sydney Marathon and achieving three of the top 20 positions in the 1970 London to Mexico World Cup Rally. In later life, the ADO17 became a popular car for competing in banger racing and in demolition derbies, owing to the bodyshell's strength, which made it ideal for those sports.

== Australia ==
=== Austin 1800 ===
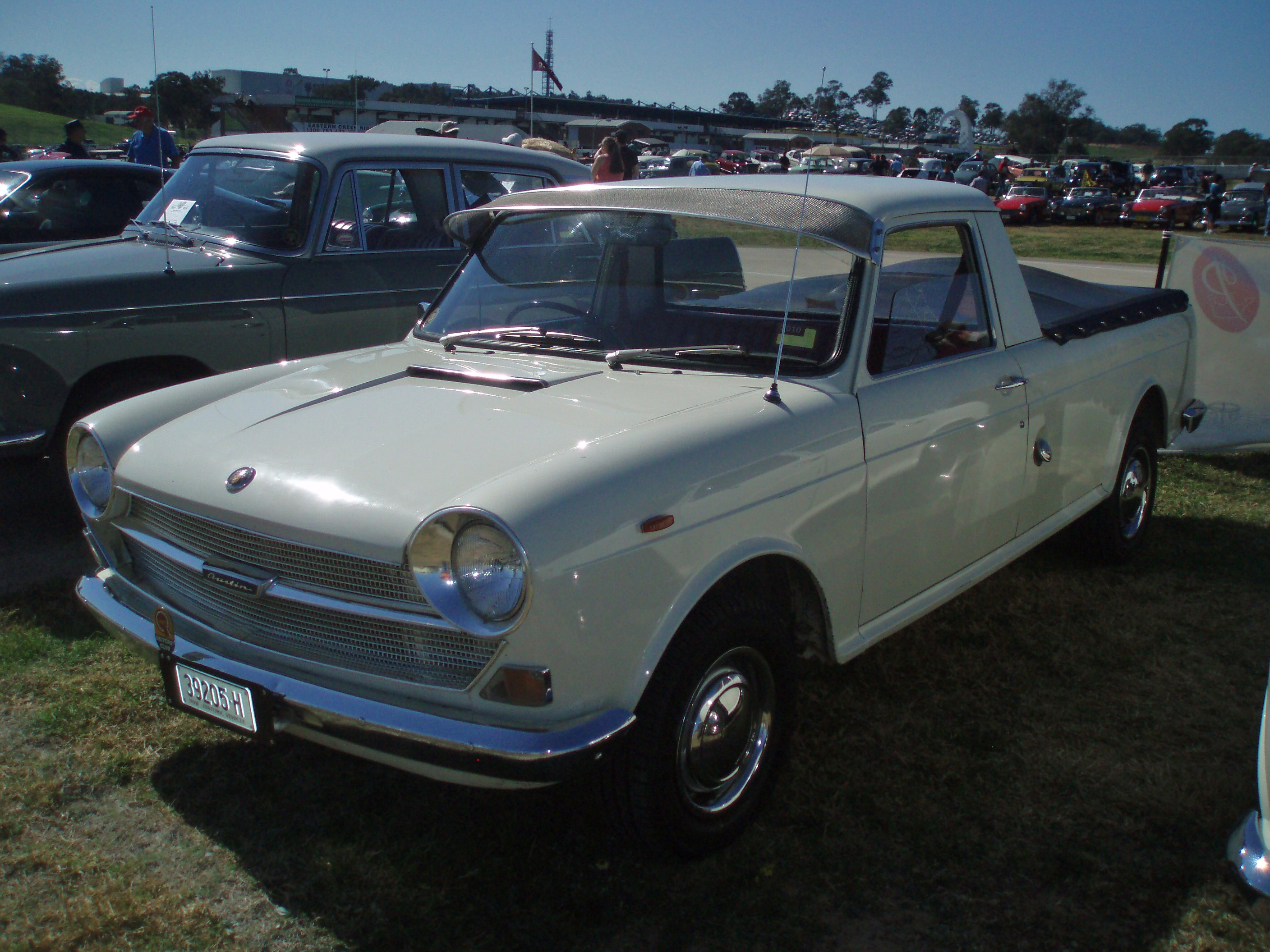
Austin 1800 Mk I Utility

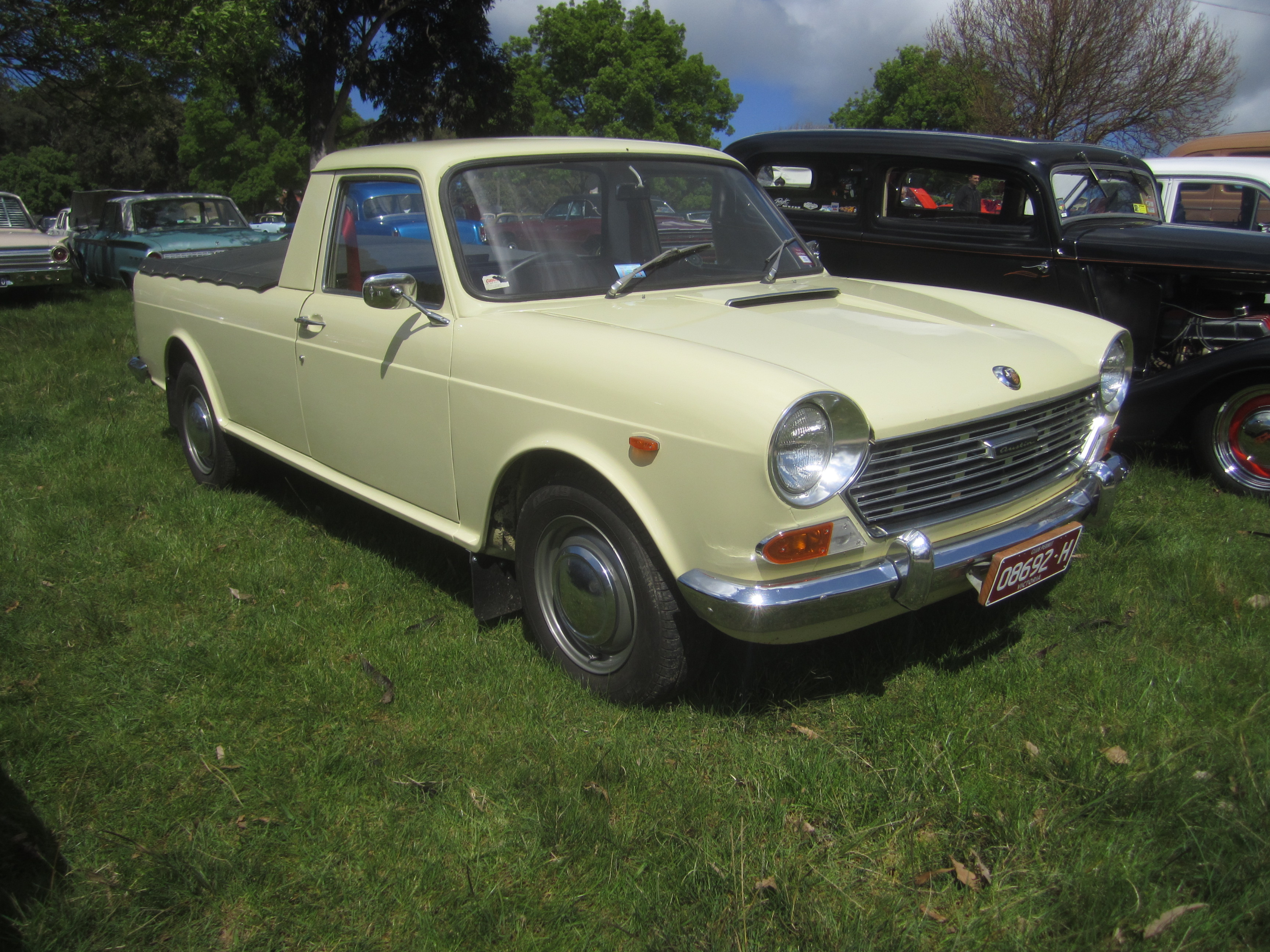
Austin 1800 Mk II Utility

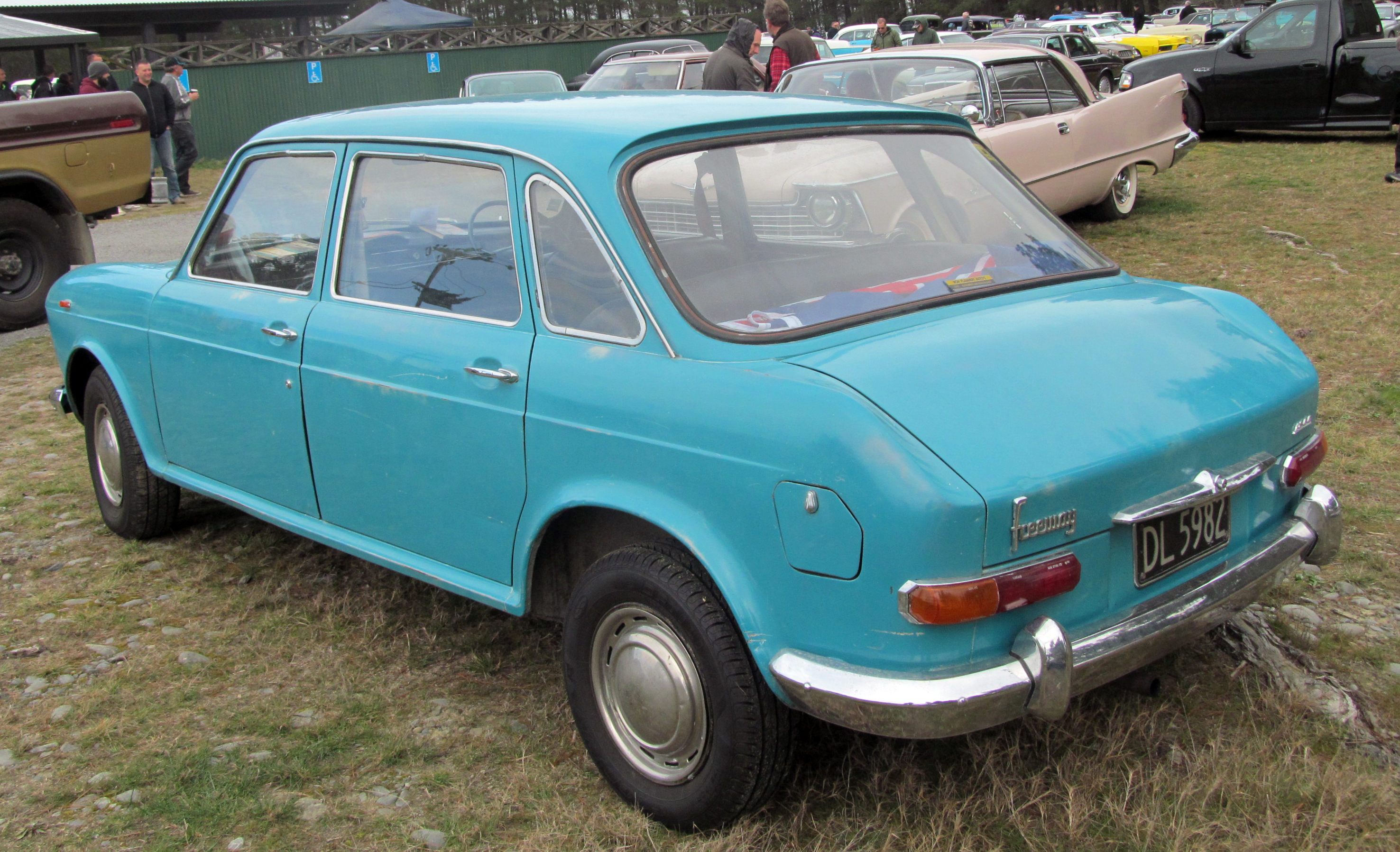
New Zealand-sold version with "BMC Freeway" badging

By 1966, Australia was described as BMC's leading world market. The 1800 was introduced in Australia in November 1965 as the Austin 1800, with a Mark II version being introduced in 1968. Australian-produced vehicles started out with a claimed local content of 65–70%, along with an undertaking from the manufacturers to raise the level to 95% in line with government requirements by the end of 1968. Initially the cars were generally identical to their British contemporaries; however, the local production was quickly modified to suit the harsher roads and climate of Australia. Modifications to the British Mark I design included raised suspension trim height, the provision of a large, heavy sump guard, and better sealing against dust. The Australian Mark II was notable in retaining the lower final drive ratio of the Mark I's manual transmission (but not the lower second gear), and, with the exception of the initial production run, was fitted with a dual-circuit hydraulic braking system manufactured locally by Paton's Brake Replacements (PBR) Pty. Ltd. Despite offering the safety of a dual-circuit system, it was generally held to be inferior in performance to the earlier Girling equipment. The Australian Mark II was also originally fitted with an alternator manufactured locally by Electricity Meter & Allied Industries Limited (EMAIL), a company better known for its kilowatt-hour meters and household appliances. In the event of failure, most EMAIL alternators were replaced by Australian-made Lucas units.

A version unique to Australia was the Austin 1800 Utility, a coupe utility produced from 1968 to 1971. Over 2,000 examples were built. The Utility was released near the end of the first series in July 1968 and most of the examples produced were therefore Mk IIs. A cab chassis variant was also offered. The 1800 Utility was given the model code YDO10.

Per capita, the Australian model sold better than anywhere else in the world. Ironically, it represented the tail-end of the popularity of British-designed cars in Australia. In the Australian market, it offered a roomy and advanced 4-cylinder alternative to the popular 6-cylinder models such as the Holden Kingswood, which used conventional engineering based on American principles. Some versions badged BMC Freeway (a name previously used for a six-cylinder Farina model in Australia) were exported to New Zealand, which also assembled UK-made Austin and Morris 1800s in separate plants.

As a one-off engineering prototype, to test production viability, an Australian 1800 Mark II body with subtly extended front guards and modified front internal structure was fitted with an early Rover 3.5 litre V8 mounted in the "North-South" position in the engine bay and then through a complex mechanical system, drove a heavily modified version of an "East-West"-mounted Borg Warner 3-speed automatic gearbox and Austin FWD differential. This car became Australia’s first locally made FWD V8 car. The car was built by BLMC (Australia) at its Victoria Park works at Zetland, New South Wales. Mass production costs and general viability of the V8 "1800" were felt to be excessive, and the project was shelved, preference being given to the Australian Leyland P76 project. Some reports state that the vehicle was eventually shipped to British Leyland in the UK and never seen again, while others claim it was simply broken up at the end of its testing by Leyland Australia.

=== Austin X6 Tasman & Kimberley ===
In 1970, the Australian subsidiary of BL replaced the 1800 with the modified and facelifted "X6" models known as the Austin Tasman and the more upmarket Austin Kimberley. These cars featured new front and rear styling and a 2.2-litre 6-cylinder version of the E series OHC four-cylinder engine (becoming one of the first front-wheel-drive cars with a transversely mounted "inline" six-cylinder engine). Both models had an updated dashboard and interior but retained the "bus"-like steering wheel position and gearshift approach from the 1800. The MkI Kimberly had a higher power engine fitted with twin SU carburettors (MkII’s reverted to single carburettors like the Tasman). The X6 series was intended to compete more effectively with the Australian-assembled rear-wheel drive six-cylinder family cars of GM Holden, Ford and Chrysler Australia. Both of the Austin cars were offered with either 4-speed manuals or a 3-speed automatic. Mark II versions of both X6 models were introduced in 1971.

The X6 Tasman and Kimberley models were given a model designation code of YDO13 with the Mark II models coded YDO19.

Despite their technical superiority, updated styling, good ride, comfort, interior space and adequate power the "X6" series were somewhat underdeveloped due to a limited budget and so became ultimately commercially inferior to their competitors – eventually being superseded by the Leyland P76 in 1973.

Local distributor New Zealand Motor Corporation initially imported the Australian Tasman and Kimberley models from Zetland, but later assembled most of its stock from CKD kits at its Petone plant near Wellington. The Kiwi cars had different interior trim materials as part of the 40-50% local parts content common at the time but otherwise differed only in detail from Australian made cars. They were, however, sold as Morris models instead of Austin.

The Australian-developed 2.2 E6 was also used in UK-built 2200 models

Eventually, by 1973, Leyland Australia had modified the L6 engine and extended the stroke of the 2200 motor to 2600 cc for final use in the Leyland P76 and L6 Marina models.

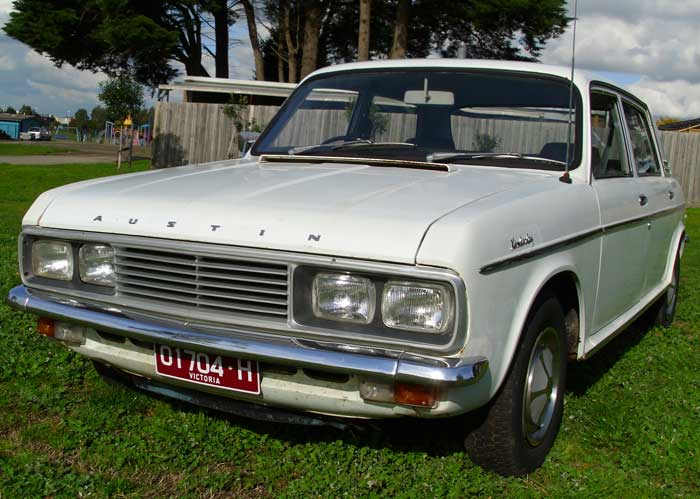
1972 Australian Austin Kimberly Mk II

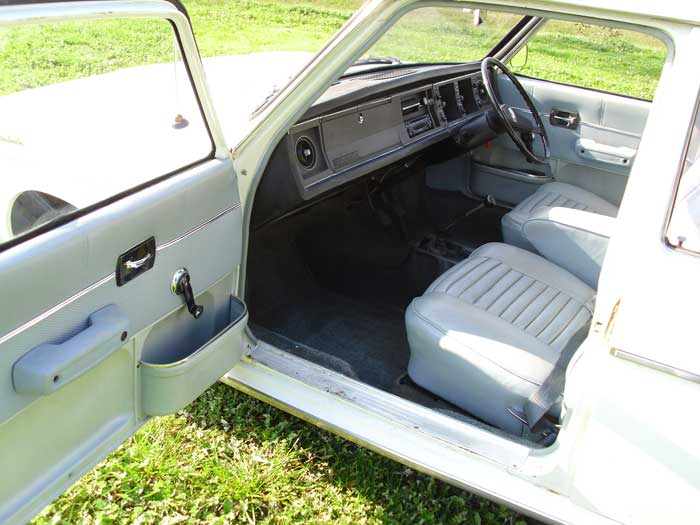
1972 Australian Austin Kimberly Mk II - interior

== BMC 1800 Aerodinamica ==
In 1967 Pininfarina unveiled at the Turin Motor Show a concept car based on the Landcrab and designed by Paolo Martin, called the BMC 1800 Aerodinamica. The sleek design previewed the Citroen CX by some seven years. The car was evaluated by BMC, and Pininfarina developed a further smaller model based on the BMC ADO16 model, but the design was not taken up by the then merged British Leyland. This was after BMC had investigated a Mini shaped version. The 1800 version was however used by chief engineer Harry Webster and was known within the Austin Morris division as the Yellow Peril.
