= British Motor Corporation (Australia) =

Former Australian manufacturing company

British Motor Corporation (Australia) was a motor manufacturing company formed in Australia in 1954 by the merger of the Austin Motor Company (Australia) and Nuffield (Australia). This followed the merger in 1952 of the Austin Motor Company and the Nuffield Group in the United Kingdom to form the British Motor Corporation. Following further corporate changes in the UK in the late 1960s, BMC Australia was absorbed into the newly established British Leyland Motor Corporation of Australia, the name of which became Leyland Motor Corporation of Australia in 1972, and then JRA Limited in March 1983.

== Austin Motor Company of Australia ==
In 1949, Austin purchased the Melbourne based Ruskin Body Works and used the factory to make ute and tourer bodies for fitting to imported Austin A40 chassis.

== Nuffield Australia ==
In 1947 Lord Nuffield purchased the former Victoria Park Racecourse, Sydney as the site for a car assembly plant. Nuffield Australia opened their new, 57-acre (23 ha) assembly and factory building in March 1950. The facility was initially set up to assemble Morris Minor and Morris Oxford models from CKD kits. Previously these cars were imported into Australia as assembled vehicles.

== British Motor Corporation (Australia) ==
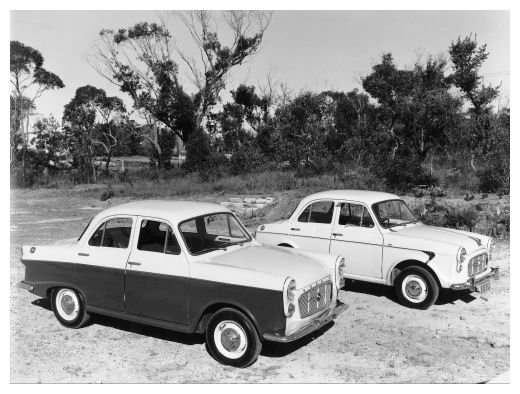
Morris Major Series II (foreground) and Series I

In 1954 the Austin Motor Company of Australia and Nuffield Australia merged to form British Motor Corporation (Australia) with the Nuffield facility at Victoria Park becoming the group headquarters of the new company. Austin and Morris vehicles were assembled at the facility and subsequently it was to be the design and manufacturing centre for BMC Australia.

During a period of significant postwar reconstruction, migrant assimilation and technical innovation, the factory employed a peak of 7,000 people from 35 nations. The only plant in Australia to manufacture the complete vehicle, it introduced to Australia the in-line transfer machining of engine blocks, the "rotodip" paint process, automatic conveyor assembly processes and major advances in just-in-time and flexible manufacturing concepts.

This factory produced the Austin Lancer and Morris Major models which were based on the Wolseley 1500 but modified for Australian conditions. In another example of the badge engineering prevalent at the time, the Morris Marshal was produced, based on the Austin A95 Westminster.

In 1961 the Mini entered production in Australia as the Morris 850. The Mini proving very popular in Australia as it was in the UK. Its success prompted a revised Australian only model line up to be introduced in 1965, beginning with the Morris Mini Deluxe, the first to use Hydrolastic suspension, to have wind-up windows, ignition key operated starter and an improved level of trim and options. Australian Minis were fitted with wind-up windows years ahead of their UK counterparts. Morris Mini Coopers and Cooper S were also made and supplied to the Australian and New Zealand Police forces as high speed pursuit vehicles. The Mini K (for Kangaroo) was the renamed Deluxe MKII and launched in March 1969 complete with Kangaroo decals.

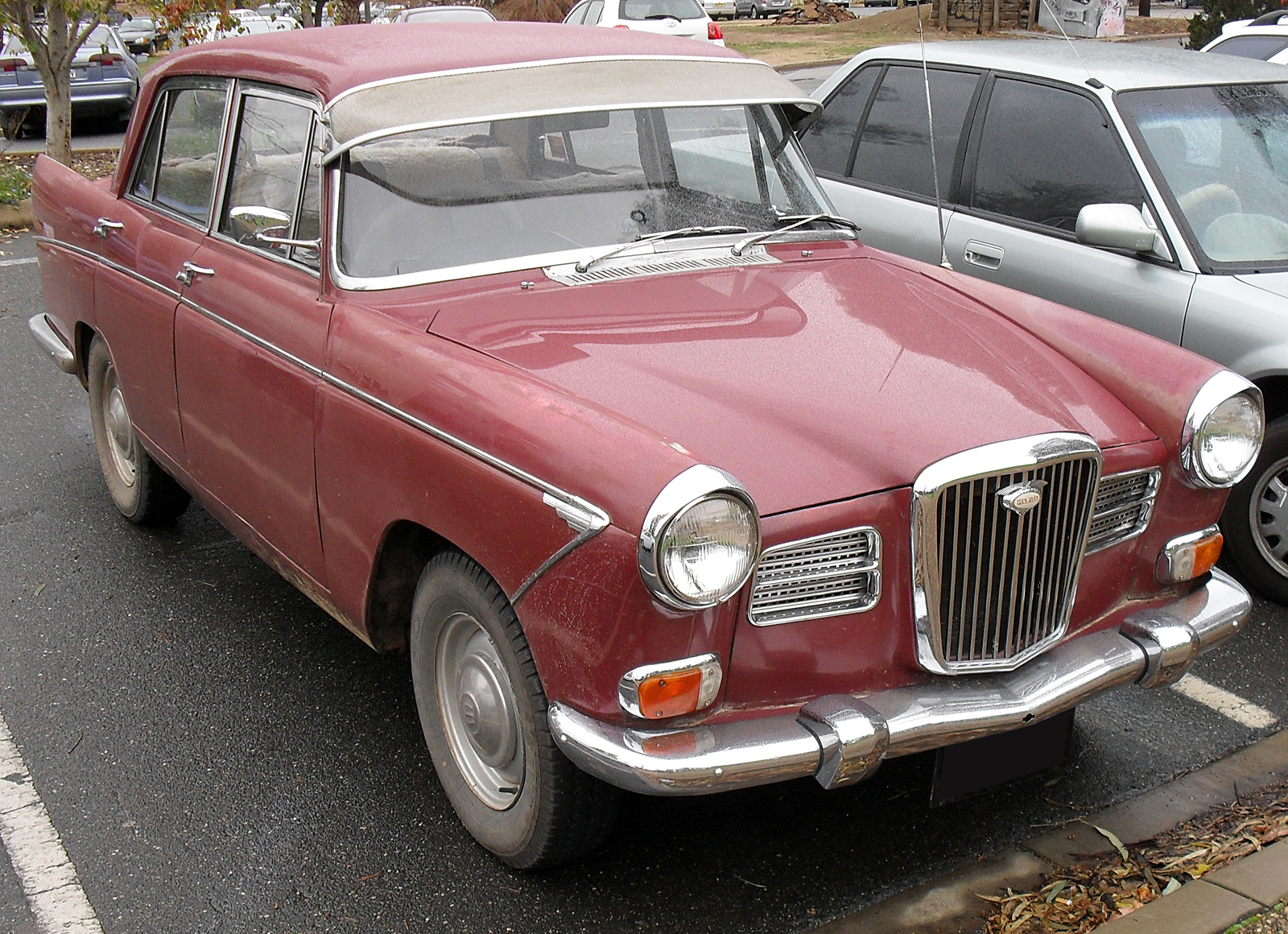
Wolseley 24/80

Released in 1962, the Austin Freeway and Wolseley 24/80 models were Australian built variants of the Austin A60 Cambridge and Wolseley 15/60 respectively, both powered by a six-cylinder version of the BMC B-Series engine. To add some Australasian brand confusion, in New Zealand the Austin Freeway was badged as a Morris Freeway and the Morris Mini Deluxe was badged as an Austin Se7en. All were made in the Sydney factory.

A local version of the BMC 1100 joined the line up, badged as the Morris 1100 and henceforth the smaller front-wheel-drive BMC models were all to be badged as Morris and the larger ones as Austins borrowing from the established markets where Vice Regal cars were Austin Princess limousines and Morris cars were mass motoring cars. Production of the Morris Mini Moke started in 1966 but fitted with larger, 13-inch wheels and longer rear wheel arms, than the UK original 10-inch.

A local version of the Austin 1800 was also produced from 1965 and this was developed into the Austin X6 range in 1970 with a six-cylinder version of the OHC BMC E-series engine and a longer wheelbase than the original. These were called the Austin Tasman for the basic model and Kimberley for the de luxe hi-end model. In New Zealand these were also sold with Morris badging and some were assembled there.

In December 1966, a plant in Rocklea, Queensland was opened.

== Leyland Motor Corporation of Australia ==
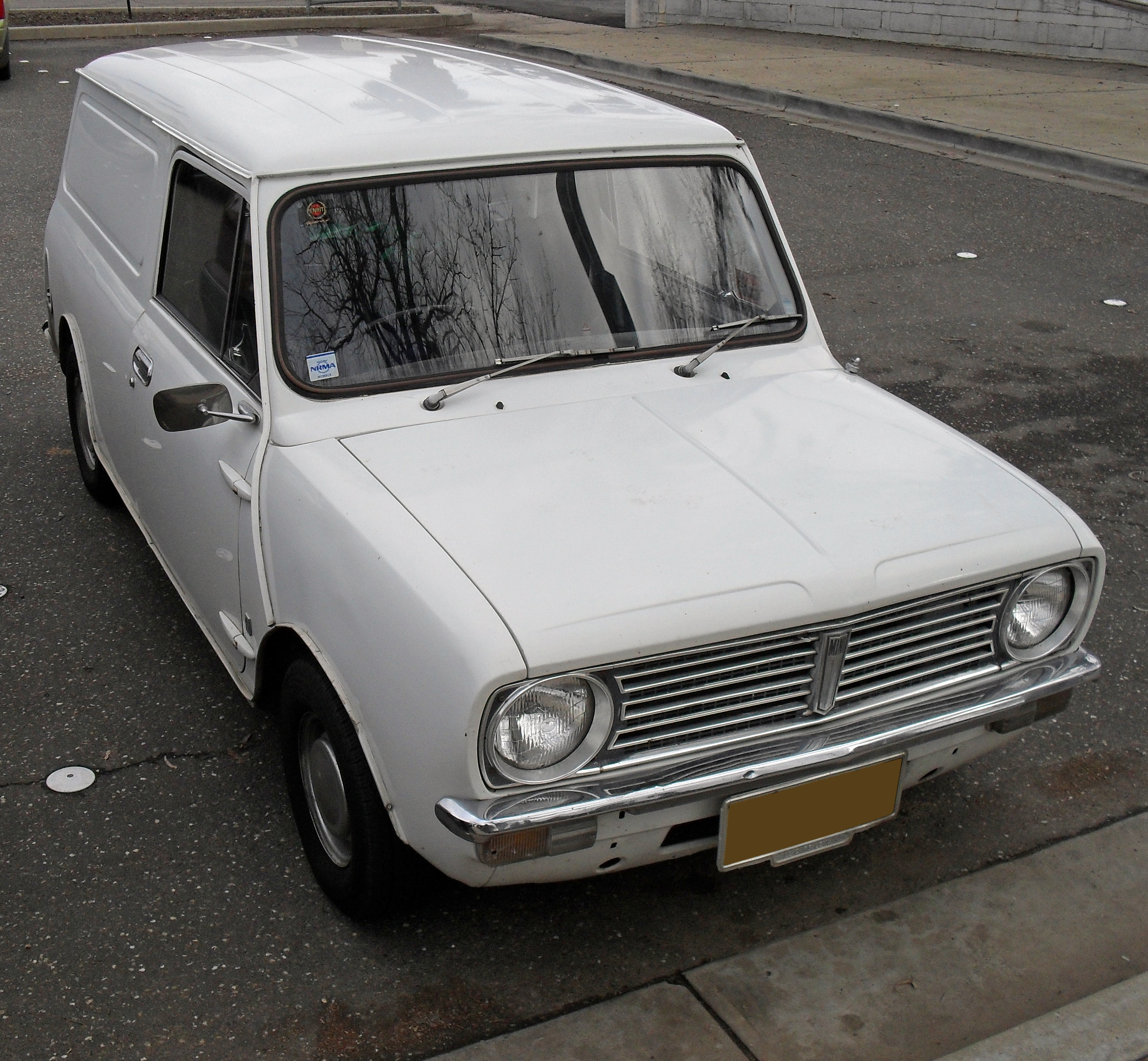
1973–1978 Leyland Mini van

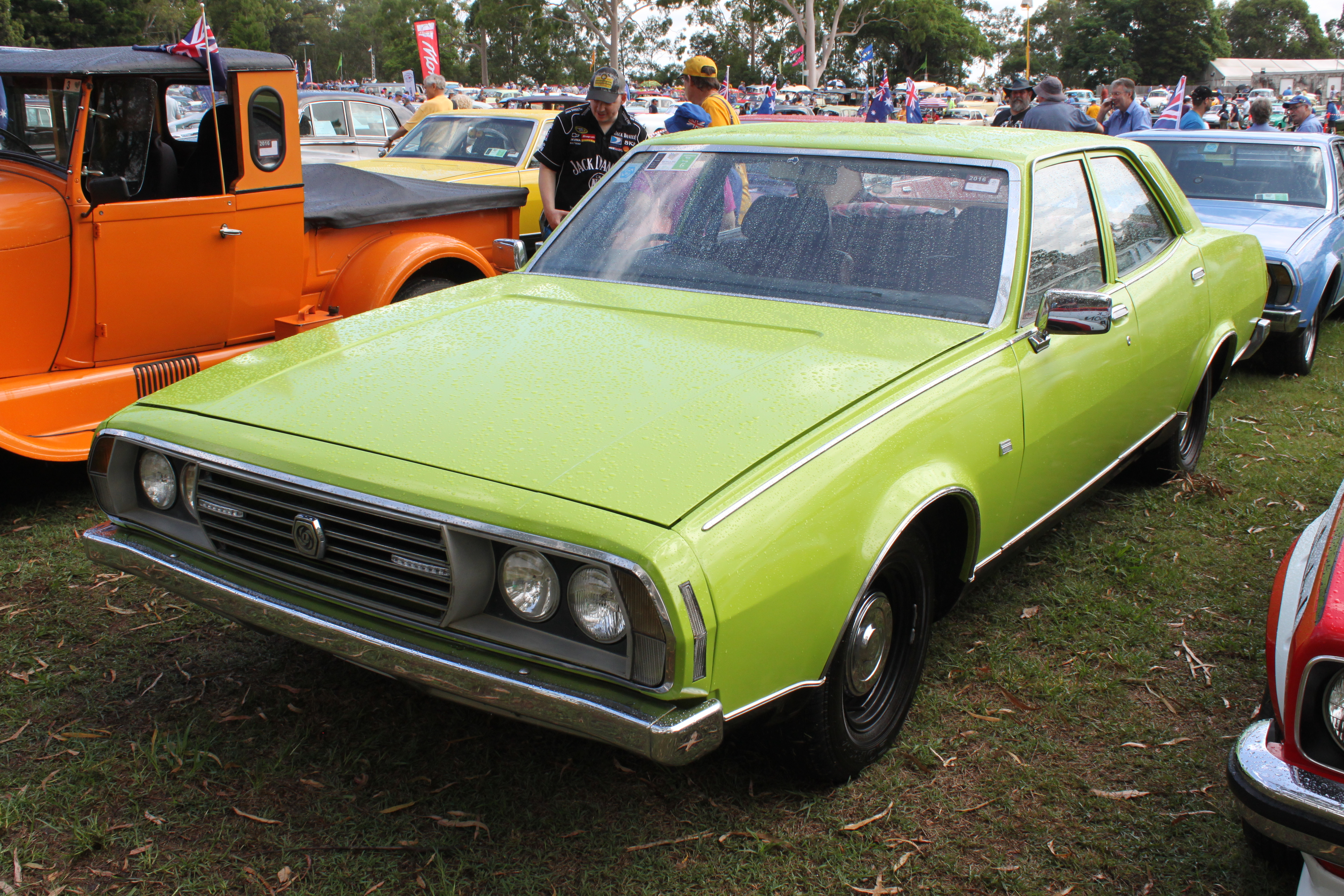
Leyland P76

By 1969 BMC Australia's parent company had merged with the Leyland Corporation to form British Leyland and a merger in Australia saw the creation of the British Leyland Motor Corporation of Australia. BMC Australia continued to trade as a division of the new company but had been renamed the Austin Morris Division by 1970. The company name was changed yet again in 1972 when it became the Leyland Motor Corporation of Australia, with the Austin Morris Division carried across to the new company.

In 1973 the Morris Mini became the Leyland Mini and the Morris Mini Moke became the Leyland Moke. The Australian version of the Morris Marina, which had joined the range in 1972, became a Leyland Marina and was offered with a local market only six-cylinder 2,623 cc engine. Australian Marinas were also shipped as CKD assembly packs to New Zealand and South Africa, where the six cylinder engine was also offered.

The Australian big car model, which was intended to see out the 1970s, was the 1973 Leyland P76. This was designed to take a straight six or alloy Rover V8 engine; while the V8 variant was more popular and praised by the Australian motoring press, its availability was affected by limited supplies of that particular engine.

Following the worldwide collapse of British Leyland and its associates, linked with the reduction of import tariffs protecting car manufacturers in Australia (Chrysler, Ford and Holden), the Victoria Park Racecourse, Sydney factory, opened by Lord Nuffield in 1957 was closed by 1975. Production of the Mini from imported CKD shells was continued by Pressed Metal Corporation (PMC) in the Sydney suburb of Enfield until 1978 and the Moke until 1982. PMC also assembled Land Rovers, Hinos and pressed metal coffins.

Leyland of Australia then proceeded to assemble the Peugeot 505 (sedan and wagon) and import the Honda Quint, which was sold as the Rover Quintet locally.

== JRA Limited ==
In March 1983 Leyland Motor Corporation Australia ceased to exist and its place was taken by JRA Limited. The new company was organised into several divisions including Jaguar-Rover-Australia, Leyland Trucks and Leyland Bus Australia. In 1987 JRA was sold by Rover Group in a management buyout. In October 1992 JRA was placed in administration by the Bank of New Zealand with Deloitte Ross Tohmatsu appointed as administrator. The Austral, Denning and Pressed Metal Corporation South Australia businesses were sold to Clifford Corporation in July 1996.
