= Austin Kimberley =

Leyland Australia-designed front-wheel-drive sedan based on the Austin 1800 platform

Austin Kimberley Austin Tasman
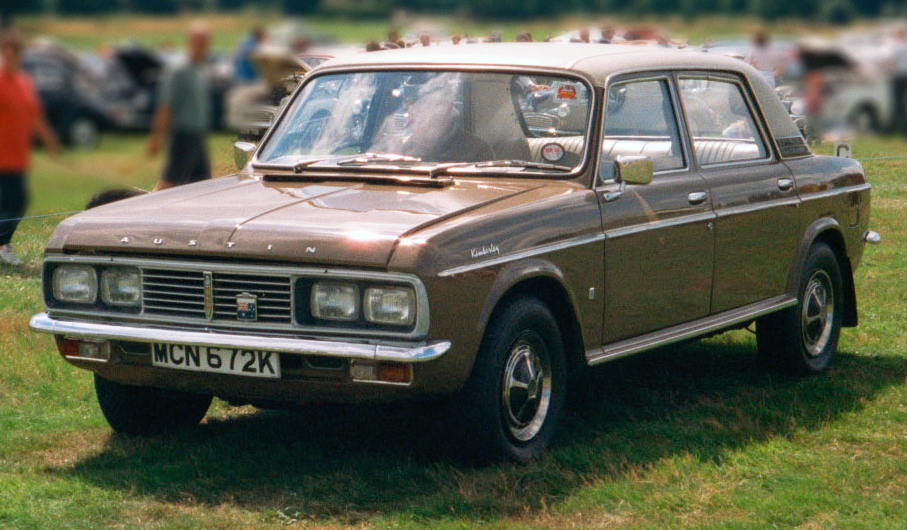
- 1971 Austin Kimberley

Overview
- Manufacturer: Leyland Australia
- Model code: X6
- Also called: Morris Kimberley (New Zealand); Morris Tasman (New Zealand)
- Production: 1970–1972
- Assembly: Australia: Newmarket, Queensland (Leyland Australia); New Zealand: Auckland; Petone (NZMC)

Body and chassis
- Class: Mid-size car
- Body style: 4-door sedan
- Layout: FF layout
- Related: Austin 1800

Powertrain
- Engine: 2,227 cc (135.9 cu in) E-series SOHC straight-6
- Transmission: 4-speed manual all-synchromesh 3-speed automatic

Dimensions
- Wheelbase: 108.125 in (2,746 mm)
- Length: 174.58 in (4,434 mm)
- Width: 66.58 in (1,691 mm)
- Height: 57.25 in (1,454 mm)

Chronology
- Predecessor: Austin 1800
- Successor: Leyland P76

The Austin Kimberley and Austin Tasman (sold by Morris in New Zealand alongside the Austin models) "X6" models are a pair of Leyland Australia-designed front-wheel-drive sedans based on the Austin 1800 (ADO17) platform, that were produced from 1970 to 1972 and sold by Austin. At the time of the X6 being launched onto the Australian market it was quite an advanced design in comparison to the other competitors from Ford, Holden and Chrysler, whose rear-wheel drive, conventionally sprung underpinnings dominated the market at the time.

== Design ==
These cars were offered as an Australian replacement to the Austin 1800. Their boxy styling, developed for the car to be a proper six-seater, was all-new, but a few features, including the doors, were retained. These doors however utilised recessed door handles, to satisfy Australian Design Rules safety concerns. The body had an exceptionally stiff torsional rigidity, a trait it inherited from the 1800s.

The standard powerplant for the X6 range was a transverse mounted 2.2L OHC straight-six engine, based on the 1500/1750 Austin Maxi unit. At the time of the X6's introduction, it was the only car in production with a transverse straight-six-cylinder engine. The Tasman's single carburettor configuration produced 76 kilowatts (102 hp) and the Kimberley 86 kW (115 hp) with its extra carburettor. Both were sold with either a four-speed manual or three-speed automatic transmission.

Due to the application in this car, its engine would also be used in ADO17 Austin 2200/Morris 2200/Wolseley Six, and later in the ADO71 Princess. In Australia, this engine, enlarged to 2.6-litres also appeared in the Morris Marina and Leyland P76, though in these two cars the engine was mounted longitudinally.

The differences generally between the Austin Kimberley and Tasman were in their trim. The Kimberley was an upmarket model, with a plush interior and four rectangular headlights, while the Tasman had basic vinyl trim, and a simplified grille with two round headlights. Mark II versions of both the Tasman and the Kimberley were introduced in 1971. The X6 was discontinued in 1972 with a total of 12,194 examples sold in Australia. The X6 Tasman and Kimberley models were given a model designation code of YDO13 with the Mark II models coded YDO19.

In the early 1970s, British Leyland had an idea of a medium-sized Vanden Plas model, based on the Australian X6 models. Had the car entered production (there was a running prototype made), it would have had a formalised Wolseley 1800/2200 front end, the rest of the car's bodyshell being X6 based. The car is now in private ownership, one of very few prototypes to leave a factory.

A second proposal was a coupé utility variant (codenamed YDO14), to replace the Australian developed Austin 1800 Utility. Although this model never reached production, Barry Anderson (ex-Leyland Australia engineer) states that two were built, one served as a "work hack" for Leyland Australia while the other was crash tested for ADR (Australian Design Rules) compliance. The surviving black work hack was offered for private sale in Melbourne in 1990, at which time it was no longer roadworthy or registered.

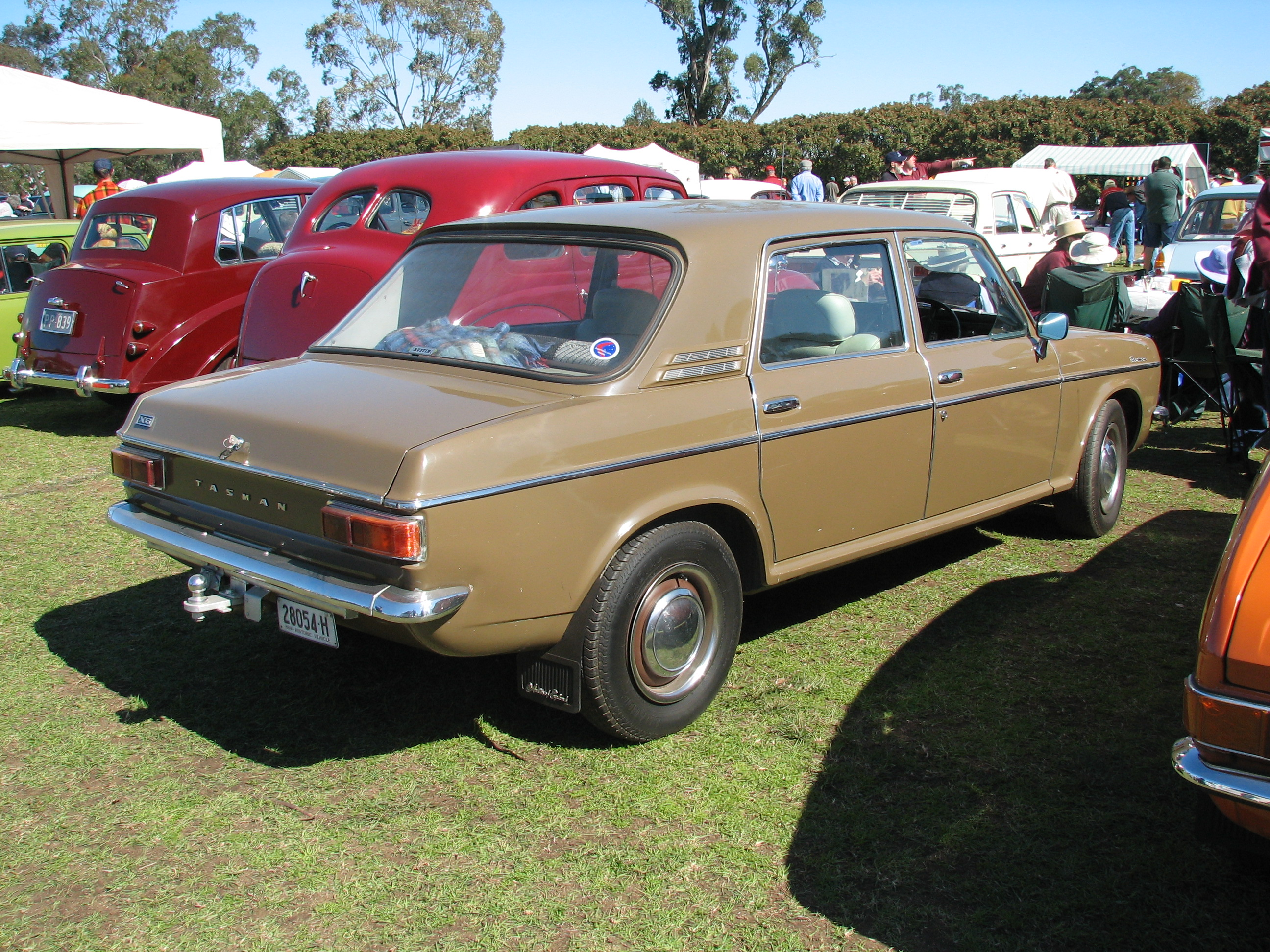
Austin Tasman

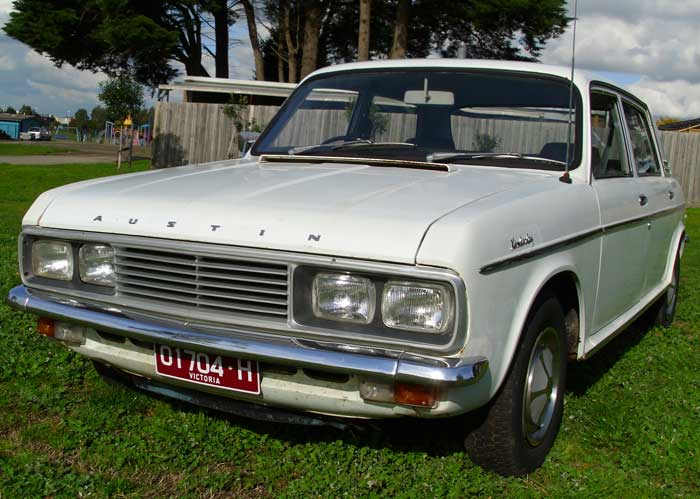
1972 Austin Kimberley Mk II

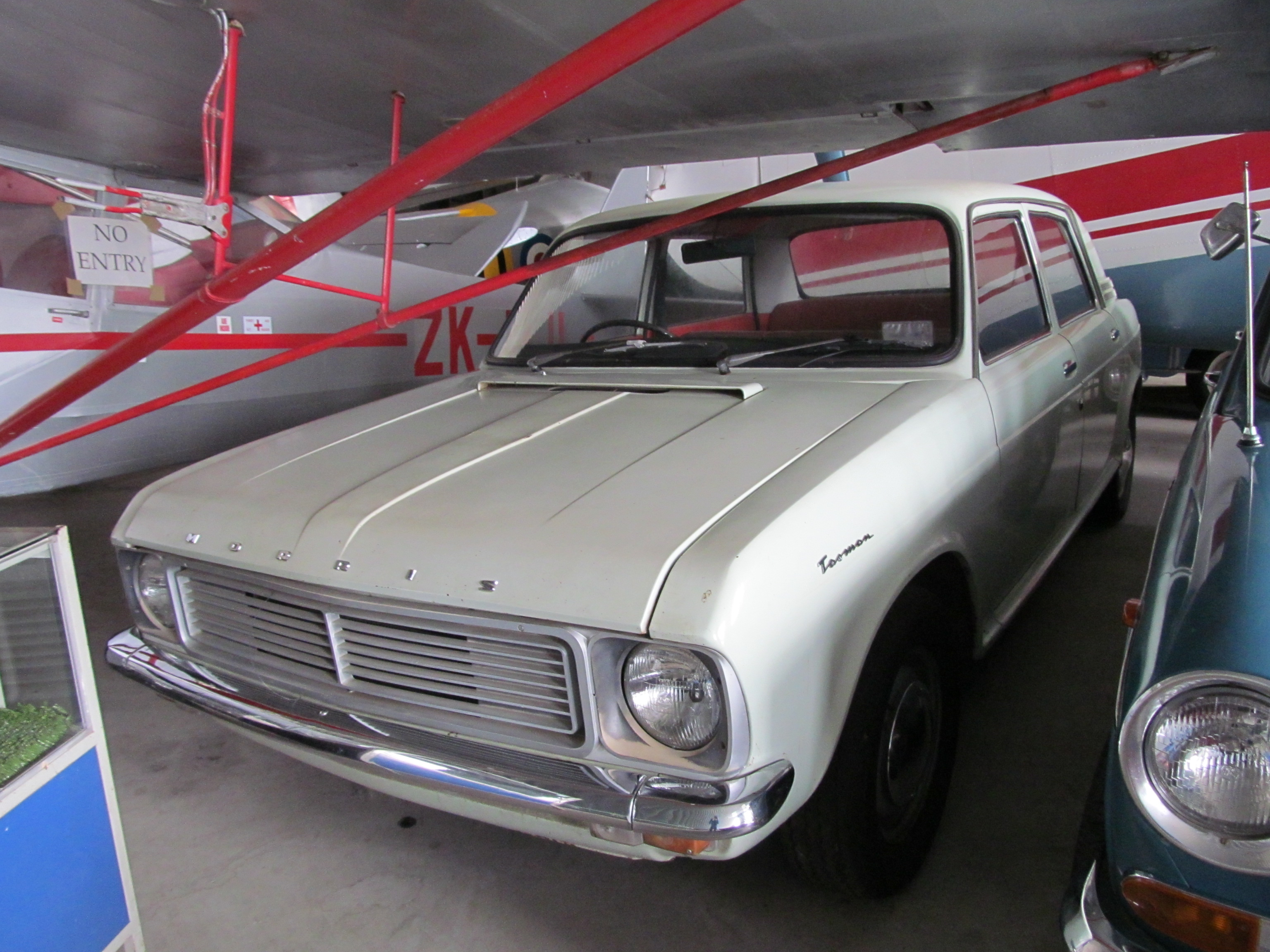
Morris Tasman (New Zealand)

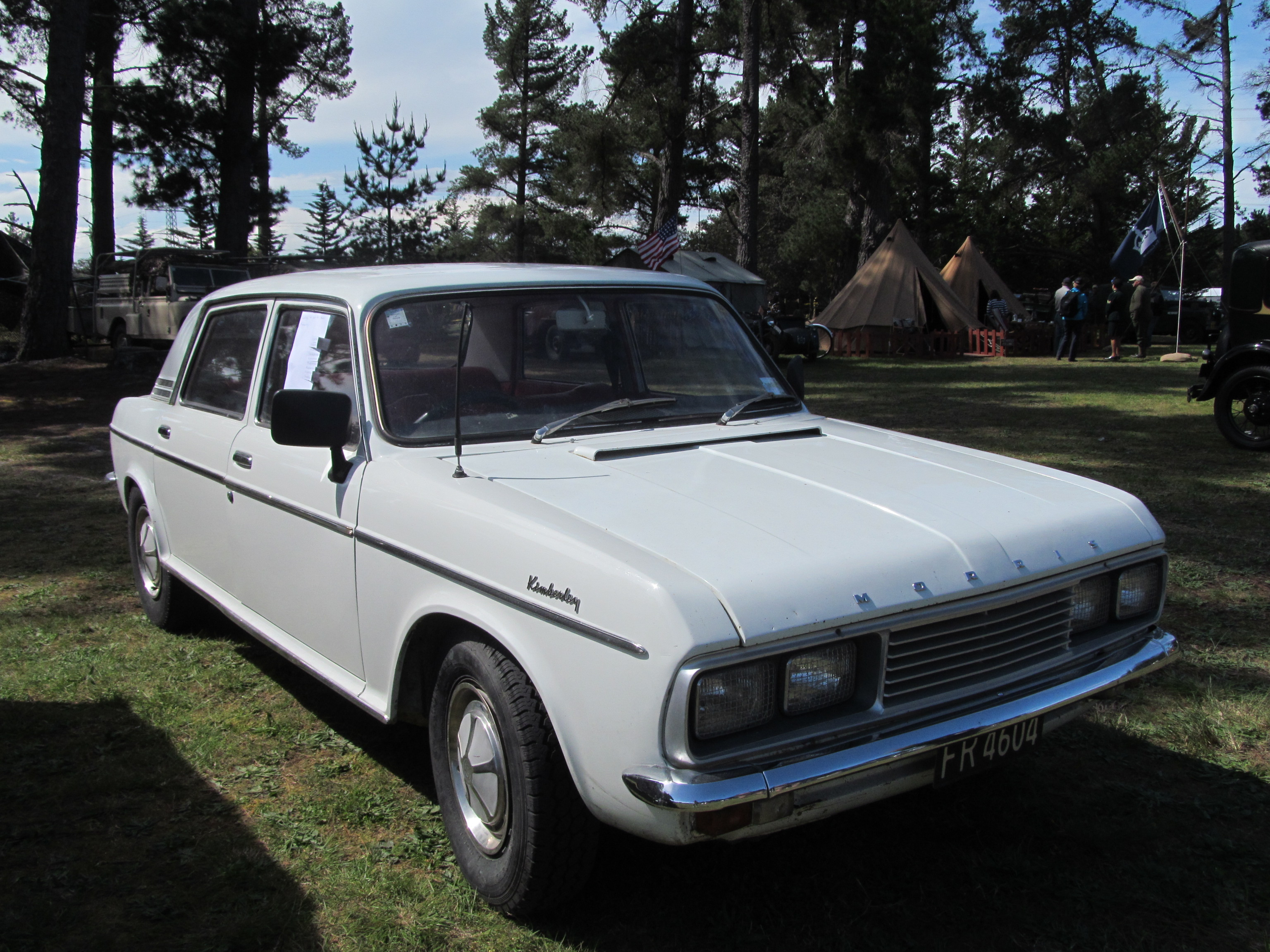
1971 Morris Kimberley (New Zealand)

== Marketing ==
In the marketplace, the cars were intended as competitors to the more established larger Holden Kingswood, Ford Falcon and Chrysler Valiant models. However, the complexities of front-wheel-drive were an issue against the car, and compounded with the lack of body variations and models, the X6 was never a serious threat to the dominance of the rear-wheel-drive and multiple-body Holdens, Fords and Chryslers. The Leyland Tasman was the standard model with single round headlamps, and the Leyland Kimberley was the deluxe model with twin rectangular headlamps.

Due to this, Leyland Australia developed a much larger rear-wheel-drive car to replace the X6, and compete directly with the Holden, Ford and Chrysler models (in both straight-6 and V8 forms), the Leyland P76, which was introduced to Australia and New Zealand in 1973. The Leyland P76 had quality issues while the company was having issues also.

When introduced, a notable selling point of the X6 was the Tasman's two bench seats, which could seat six (the plusher Kimberley had separate front seats and sat five). One advertisement for the New Zealand specification Morris Tasman X6 proclaimed that the bench seats could hold the driver and seven schoolboy rugby players. Whilst this may seem an exaggerated claim by its makers, the 1800/Kimberley platform did provide excellent passenger room for a vehicle of such a compact outer dimensions, a legacy of Sir Alec Issigonis who strived for increased cabin space on a small footprint as witness the Mini, 1100, 1800 and Maxi.

== Vehicles ==
A white Morris Tasman X6 is preserved at the Wanaka Transport Museum, in New Zealand. Fittingly, while the cars themselves are moved constantly around the museum, it is always shown parked alongside an Austin 1800.

Two Austin Tasman utility vehicles were built, one served as a 'work hack' for Leyland Australia while the other was crash tested.
