= Morris Marshal =

Overview
- Manufacturer: British Motor Corporation (Australia)
- Production: 1957–1960
- Assembly: Brisbane, Qld, Australia; Victoria Park, NSW, Australia

Body and chassis
- Body style: 4-door sedan 5-door wagon panel van

Powertrain
- Engine: 2,639 cc (161.0 cu in) Straight-6

Dimensions
- Wheelbase: 96 in (2,400 mm)
- Length: 181 in (4,600 mm)
- Width: 63 in (1,600 mm)
- Height: 61.5 in (1,560 mm)

Chronology
- Predecessor: Morris Isis
- Successor: None

The Morris Marshal is a large six-cylinder vehicle which was produced by the British Motor Corporation (Australia) between 1957 and 1960. The car was a Morris branded version of the Austin Westminster which was marketed by BMC Australia's Austin dealers as the Austin A95 Westminster. Production totaled 1,341 sedans, 54 Traveller wagons and 30 panel vans.

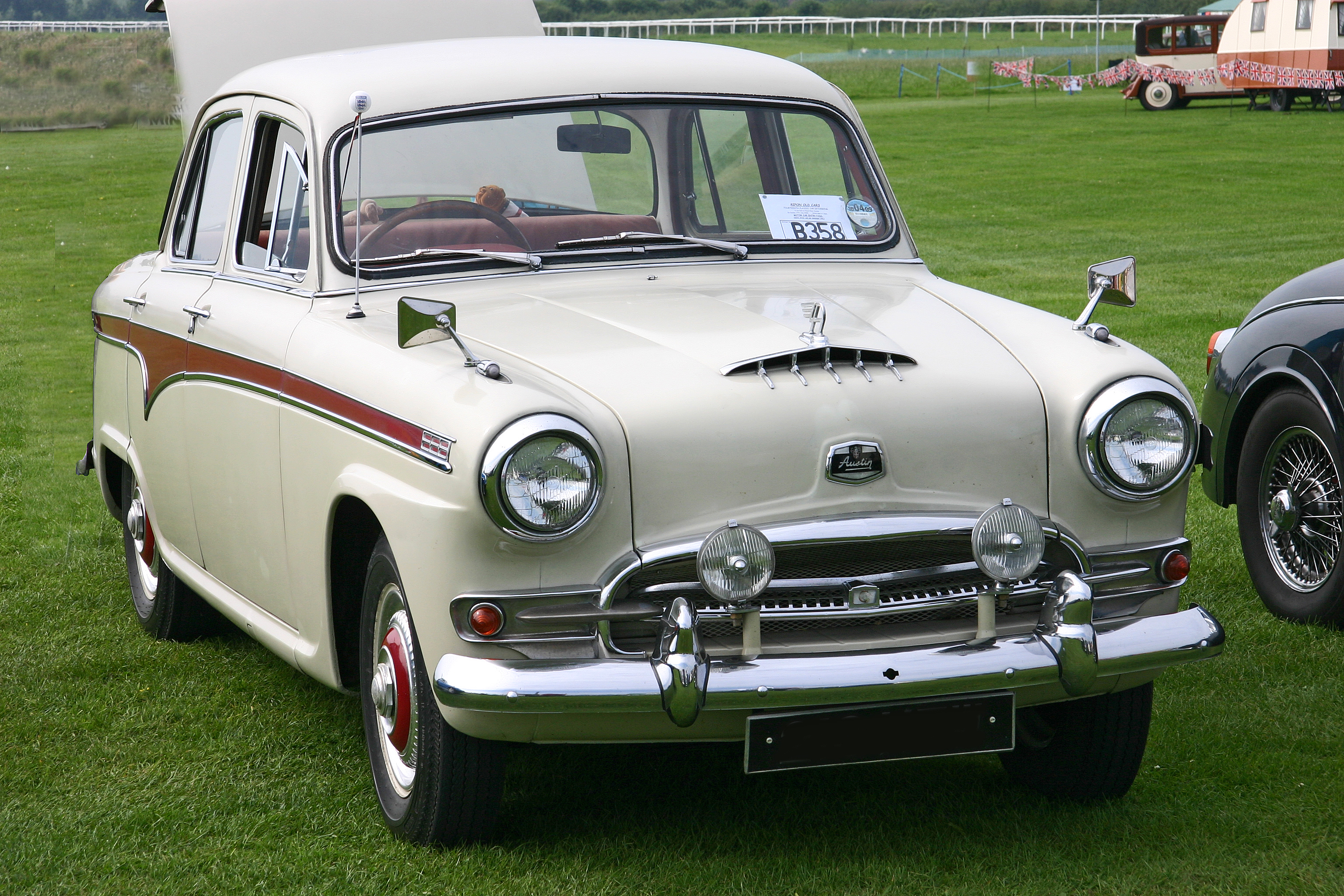
The Morris Marshal was based on the Austin A95 Westminster (pictured)
