= John Barber (businessman) =

Barber, John Norman Romney (1919–2004), motor industry executive

John Norman Romney Barber (22 April 1919 – 21 October 2004) was a British businessman who held senior director positions at Ford of Britain, AEI and at British Leyland.

== Business career ==
John Barber served in the British Army during the Second World War, rising to the rank of captain. He joined the Ministry of Supply in 1946 before leaving in 1956 to take up the role of assistant controller at Ford of Britain. By 1962 he had risen to finance director, taking on its consumer credit wing in 1963. Barber introduced a company graduate scheme in the finance department and the company became a nursery for British business management. He had also been instrumental in the development of the Lotus Cortina due to his passion for motorsport and because “You must assess where motor sport can help in areas where your company is weak. For example, in 1959, Ford had the Tin Lizzie image and young people were buying the Mini".

In 1965 Barber left Ford due what he saw as "creeping Americanisation" and joined the conglomerate AEI as finance director. This business was taken over by GEC in 1967, and Barber rejected Arnold Weinstock's offer of a job. In 1968 he was offered a job by Donald Stokes at Leyland as its director of finance and planning. This was in the midst of the merger with British Motor Corporation, which he was accredited along with chairman of the Government's Industrial Reorganisation Corporation, Sir Frank Kearton of the rapid agreement of the merger. Barber became joint managing director of the newly formed British Leyland in 1971, a role he held with George Turnbull. After a power struggle with Turnbull, Barber would eventually go on to become deputy chairman of the company in 1973, but was seen as a Ford man constraining the company with Ford ideas. In 1974 British Leyland run out of money and the government took over, commissioning the Ryder Report. Barber was not included in preparing the report on the future of British Leyland, in which he was heavily criticised, a report he called "hopelessly optimistic", and he was sacked in August 1975 after refusing to resign. Barber sued the British government and was given a six-figure compensation sum in 1976.

After leaving British Leyland he worked as an occasional writer for the Financial Times on automotive subjects, as well as working as an unpaid consultant for Jensen Motors during their financial collapse. Barber was part of a failed consortium headed by Donald Healey to purchase Reliant during 1976/77. He then went on to work as chairman of Pullmaflex, Aberhurst, AC Engineering and Cox & Kings Financial Services, and served on the board of several companies including Spear & Jackson, Acrow, John E. Wiltshier and the Communications Group.

== Personal life ==
Barber was born in Leigh-on-Sea, Essex, attending a school in nearby Westcliff-on-Sea. He went on to read economics at the University of London. Barber was married to Babette (died 2003) and had one son.
