= British Leyland =

1968–1986 automotive manufacturing conglomerate

- Industry: Automotive
- Predecessors: British Motor Holdings; Leyland Motors
- Founded: 17 January 1968; 58 years ago
- Founders: George Harriman; Donald G. Stokes
- Defunct: 1986; 40 years ago
- Fate: Renamed as Rover Group
- Successor: Rover Group
- Headquarters: Longbridge (Austin Rover), Birmingham; Cowley, Oxfordshire, United Kingdom
- Key people: John Barber; George Turnbull; Sir Michael Edwardes; Harold Musgrove; Graham Day
- Products: Motor vehicles
- Brands: Austin; Land Rover; Leyland; MG; Riley; Wolseley; Vanden Plas; Princess; Jaguar; Daimler; Mini; Innocenti; Morris; Rover; Triumph; Albion; AEC; Guy; Scammell
- Number of employees: 250,000
- Subsidiaries: Jaguar Cars (until 1984); Unipart (1974–1987); Austin Rover (from 1982); Leyland Bus (until 1987); Leyland Trucks (until 1987); Land Rover (from 1978); Coventry Climax (until 1982); Prestcold (until 1981); Aveling-Barford (until 1988); Innocenti (1972–1976); Leyland Motor Corporation of Australia (until 1983)

British Leyland was a British automotive engineering and manufacturing conglomerate formed in 1968 as British Leyland Motor Corporation Ltd (BLMC), following the merger of Leyland Motors and British Motor Holdings. It was partly nationalised in 1975, when the British government created a holding company called British Leyland, later renamed BL in 1978. It incorporated much of the British-owned motor vehicle industry, which in 1968 had a 40% share of the UK car market, with its history going back to 1895. Despite containing profitable marques such as Jaguar, Rover, and Land Rover, as well as the best-selling Mini, BLMC had a troubled history, leading to its eventual collapse in 1975 and subsequent part-nationalisation.

After much restructuring and divestment of subsidiary companies as well as entering into a major alliance with Honda, BL was renamed the Rover Group in 1986, becoming a subsidiary of British Aerospace from 1988 to 1994, then was subsequently bought by BMW. The final surviving incarnation of the company as the MG Rover Group went into administration in 2005, bringing mass car production by British-owned manufacturers to an end. MG and the Austin, Morris and Wolseley marques became part of China's SAIC, with whom MG Rover attempted to merge prior to administration. As of 2026, Mini, Jaguar Land Rover, Leyland Trucks, and Unipart are the most prominent former parts of British Leyland that still exist, with SAIC still operating its UK base out of the former Longbridge site. The Indian truck manufacturer Ashok Leyland also continues to use the Leyland name and logo, but now operates independently of any former Leyland Motors or BL subsidiary.

== History ==
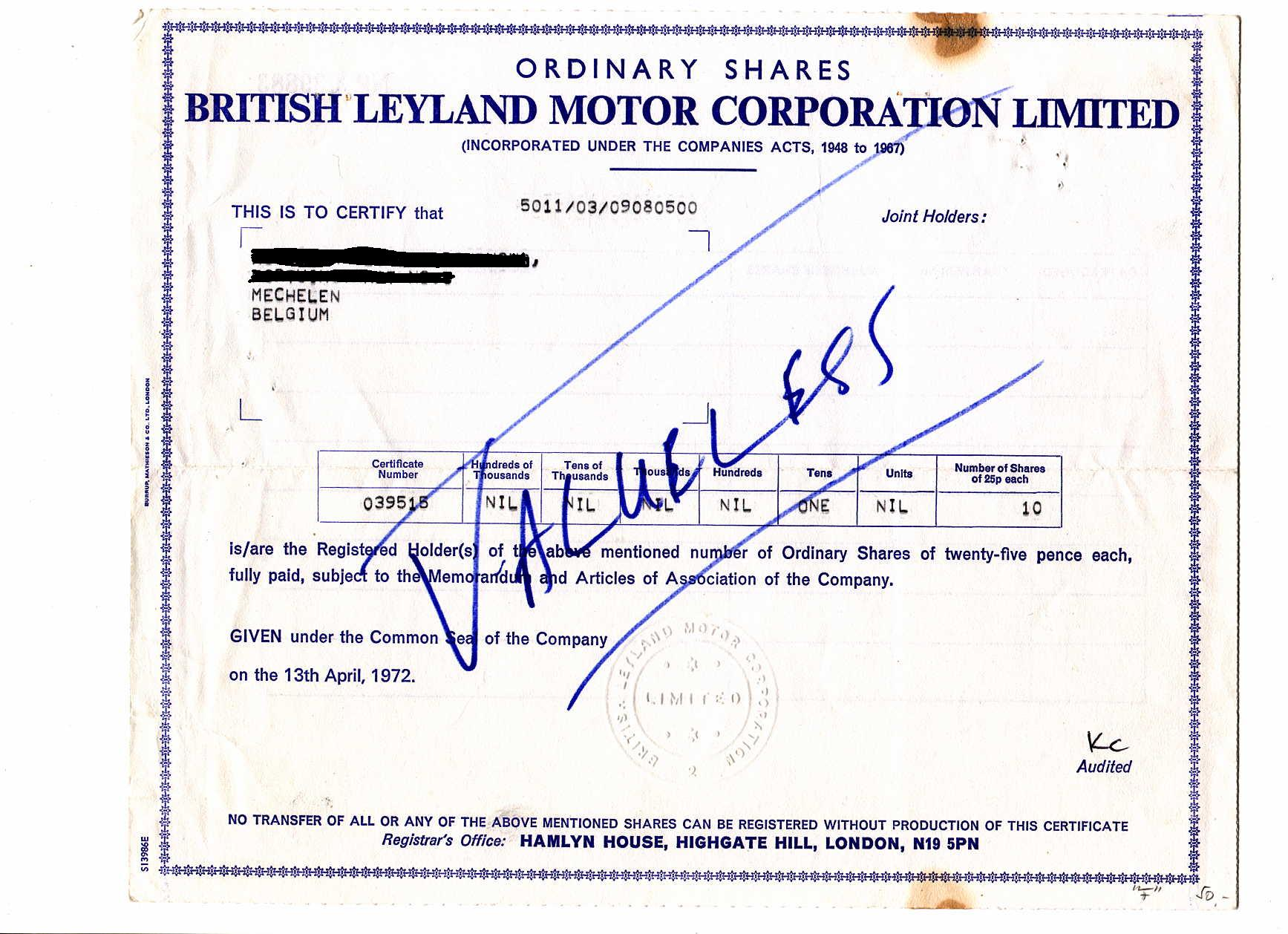
BLMC share

=== 1968–1974: Creation of BLMC, and the Stokes era ===
BLMC was founded on 17 January 1968 by the merger of British Motor Holdings (BMH) and Leyland Motor Corporation (LMC), encouraged by Tony Benn as chairman of the Industrial Reorganisation Committee created by the first Wilson Government. At the time, LMC was a highly successful truck and bus manufacturer – as well as owning prosperous car brands Triumph and Rover – whilst BMH (which was the product of an earlier merger between the British Motor Corporation, Pressed Steel and Jaguar) was perilously close to collapse. The government hoped LMC's expertise would revive the ailing BMH, and effectively create a "British General Motors". The merger combined most of the remaining independent British car manufacturing companies and included car, bus and truck manufacturers and more diverse enterprises including: construction equipment, refrigerators, metal casting companies, road surface manufacturers; in all, nearly one hundred different companies. The new corporation was arranged into seven divisions under its new chairman, Sir Donald Stokes (formerly the chairman of LMC). At the time of its founding, BLMC was the world's fifth largest vehicle manufacturer after General Motors, Ford, Chrysler and Volkswagen.

The seven divisions were:

- Austin-Morris; the volume car division made up entirely of the former British Motor Corporation marques (Austin, Morris, MG, Riley and Wolseley), as well as Austin and BMC branded light commercial vehicles.
- Specialist Division; the sports/luxury marques (Rover, Land Rover, Alvis, Triumph and Jaguar – the latter having moved across from the old BMC/BMH organisation).
- Leyland Truck and Bus; the original Leyland commercial vehicles business.
- Pressed Steel Fisher (PSF); had its origins in the Pressed Steel Company which had been a BMH subsidiary that made car body shells for both BLMC and other manufacturers.
- Overseas; made up largely of BLMC's satellite car manufacturing operations around the world – many of these had been inherited from BMH.
- Construction Equipment
- General Engineering & Foundries

While BMH was the UK's largest car manufacturer (producing over twice as many cars as LMC), it offered a range of dated vehicles, including the Morris Minor which was introduced in 1948 and the Austin Cambridge and Morris Oxford, which dated back to 1959. Although BMH had enjoyed great success in the 1960s with both the Mini and the 1100/1300, both cars were infamously underpriced and despite their pioneering but unproven front wheel drive engineering, warranty costs had been crippling and had badly eroded those models' profitability.

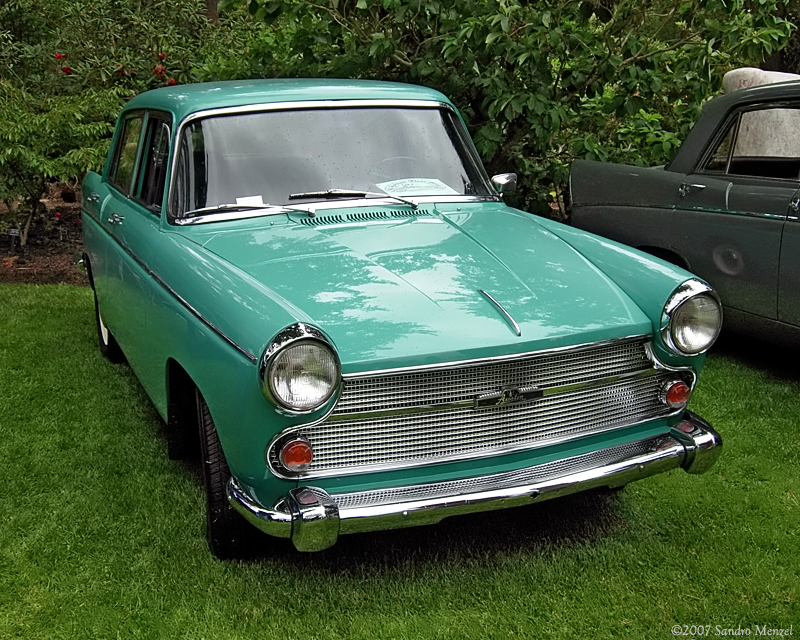
1962 Austin Cambridge

After the merger, Lord Stokes was horrified to find that BMH had no plans to replace the elderly designs in its portfolio. Also, BMH's design efforts immediately prior to the merger had focused on unfortunate niche market models such as the Austin Maxi (which was underdeveloped and with an appearance hampered by using the doors from the larger Austin 1800) and the Austin 3-litre, a car with no discernible place in the market.

The lack of attention to the development of new mass-market models meant that BMH had nothing in the way of new models in the pipeline to compete effectively with popular rivals such as Ford's Escort and Cortina.

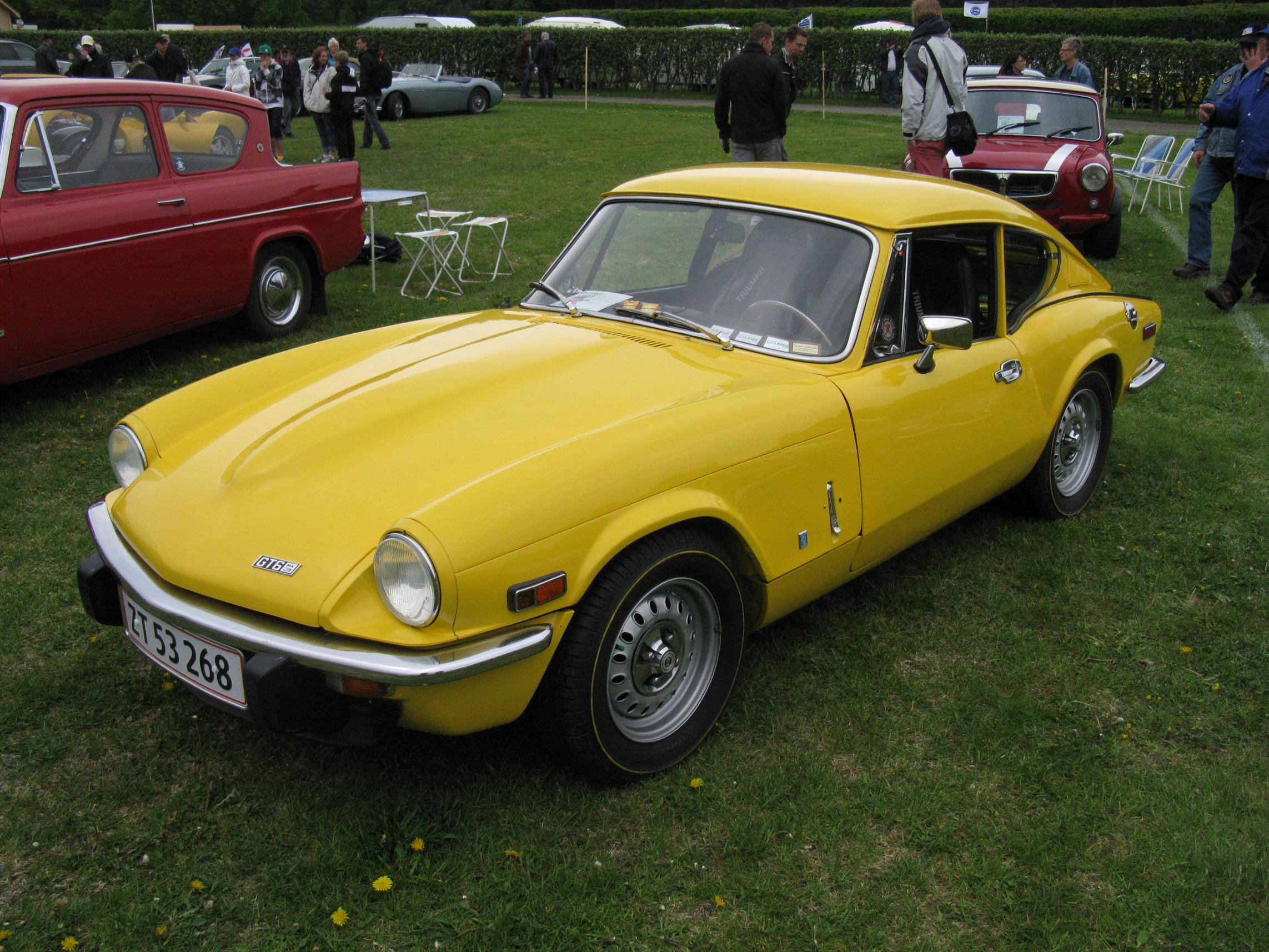
Triumph GT6 Mk III

Immediately, Lord Stokes instigated plans to design and introduce new models quickly. The first result of this crash programme was the Morris Marina in early-1971. It used parts from various BL models with new bodywork to produce BL's mass-market competitor. It was one of the strongest-selling cars in the United Kingdom in the 1970s; being the second-most popular new car sold in Britain in 1973; though by the end of production in 1980 it was widely regarded as a dismal product that had damaged the company's reputation. The Austin Allegro (replacement for the 1100/1300 ranges), launched in 1973, gained a similar reputation over its ten-year production life.

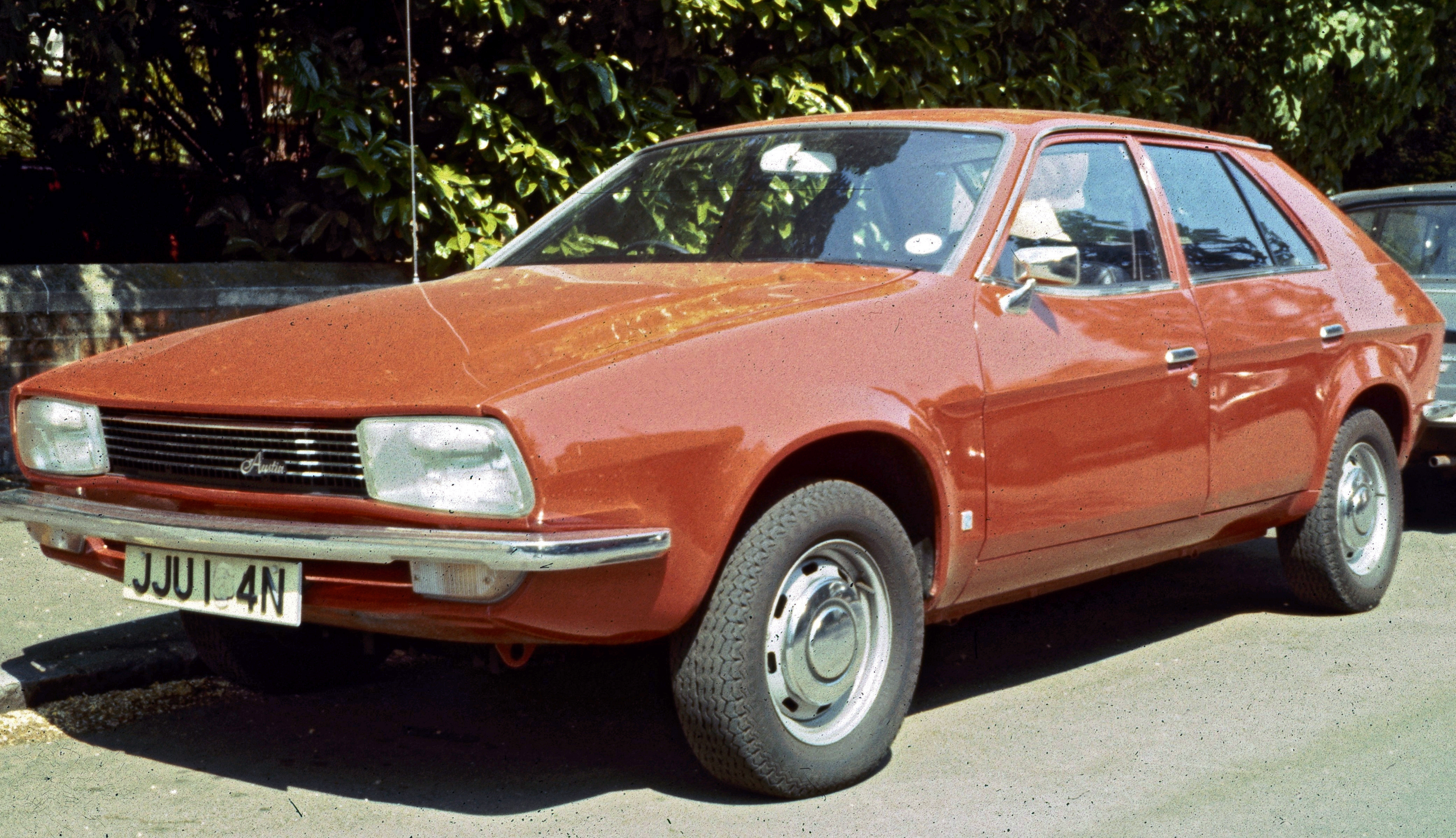
1975 Austin 1800

The company became an infamous example of the industrial turmoil that plagued the United Kingdom in the 1970s. Action by unions frequently crippled BL manufacturing. Despite the duplication of production facilities as a result of the merger, there were multiple single points of failure in the company's production network which meant that a strike in a single plant could stop many of the others. Domestic rivals Ford and General Motors mitigated against this by merging their previously separate British and German subsidiaries and product lines (Ford combined Ford of Britain and Ford Germany to create Ford of Europe, whilst GM eventually merged the operations of Vauxhall and Opel), so that production could be sourced from either British or Continental European plants in the event of industrial unrest. The upshot was that both Ford and Vauxhall ultimately overtook BL to become Britain's two best-selling marques. At the same time, a tide of Japanese imports, spearheaded by Nissan (Datsun) and Toyota exploited both BL's inability to supply its customers and its declining reputation for quality. Continental carmakers including Fiat, Renault and Volkswagen were also achieving strong sales on the British market.

By the end of the 1970s, the British government had introduced protectionist measures in the form of import quotas on Japanese manufacturers to protect the ailing domestic producers (both BL and Chrysler Europe), which it was helping to sustain.

At its peak, BLMC owned almost forty manufacturing plants across the country. Even before the merger, BMH had included theoretically competing marques that were in fact selling substantially similar badge engineered cars. The British Motor Corporation had never properly integrated either the dealer networks or the production facilities of Austin and Morris. This had been done partly to appease poor industrial relations, as decades old rivalries between Austin and Morris workers at Longbridge and Cowley respectively, had persisted after the 1952 merger and creation of BMC. The upshot was that both plants were producing badge engineered models of otherwise identical Austin and Morris cars so that each dealer network would have a product to sell. This meant that Austin and Morris still, to an extent, competed with each other and meant that each product was saddled with effectively twice the logistics, marketing and distribution costs that it would have if sold under a single name or if production of a single model platform was concentrated in one factory. Although BL did eventually end the wasteful double sourcing – for example production of the Mini and the 1100/1300 was concentrated at Longbridge, whilst the 1800 and Austin Maxi ranges moved to Cowley, the production of sub-assemblies as well as component suppliers were scattered all over the Midlands which greatly increased the cost of keeping the factories running.

BMH and Leyland Motors had expanded and acquired companies throughout the 1950s and 1960s which were in direct competition with each other, with the result that when the two conglomerates were brought together into BL there was even more internal competition. Rover competed with Jaguar at the expensive end of the market, and Triumph with its family cars and sports cars against Austin, Morris and MG. Internal politics became so bad that one marque's team would attempt to derail another marque's programmes.

Individual model lines that were similarly sized were therefore competing against each other, yet were never discontinued nor were model ranges rationalised quickly enough; in fact, the policy of having multiple models competing in the same market segment continued long after the merger – for instance BMH's MGB remained in production alongside LMC's Triumph TR6, the Rover P5 competed with the Jaguar XJ, whilst in the medium family sector, the Princess was in direct competition with upscale versions of the Morris Marina and Austin Maxi, meaning that economies of scale resulting from large production runs could never be realised. In addition, in consequent attempts to establish British Leyland as a brand in consumers' minds in and outside the UK, print ads and spots were produced, causing confusion rather than attraction for buyers.

BL marketing and management attempted to draw more obvious distinctions between the marques – most notable was the decision to pitch Morris as a maker of conventional mass-market cars to compete with Ford and Vauxhall and Austin to continue BMC's line of advanced family cars with front-wheel drive and fluid suspension. This resulted in the development of the Morris Marina and the Austin Allegro. The policy's success was mixed. Since the dealership network was still not sufficiently rationalised it meant that Austin and Morris dealers (which had, in BMC/BMH days, each offered a full range of cars both advanced and traditional) had their product range halved and found that they could no longer cater to many previously loyal customers' tastes. The policy was also carried out haphazardly: The advanced, Hydragas-sprung Princess began life in 1975 sold as an Austin, a Morris and a Wolseley before being rebadged altogether under the new Princess name. The Princess (and the Mini, which BL also turned into a marque in its own right) was sold across the Austin-Morris dealership network, making any distinction between the two even more vague to many customers. Critically, the new models that had been introduced by BLMC failed to sell in high enough quantities outside of the home market, despite the UK now being a part of the European Economic Community – with the Allegro and Princess, in particular, having been tailored for European tastes. However, both these vehicles were saloons when the trend in Europe was moving towards family-sized hatchbacks, typified by the Volkswagen Golf in 1974 and the Simca 1307 (Chrysler Alpine) in 1975.

The company also wasted much of its scant funds on concepts, such as the Rover P8 or P9, that never entered production to earn income for the company.

These internal issues, which were never satisfactorily solved, combined with serious industrial relations problems with trade unions, the 1973 oil crisis, the three-day week, high inflation and ineffectual management meant that BL became an unmanageable and financially crippled behemoth. "Following a disastrous couple of years in the marketplace, by the end of 1974 BLMC was on the brink of bankruptcy. Its financial backers – the City banks – had become very nervous about its future, and persuaded Lord Stokes to approach Tony Benn for financial assistance."

=== 1975–1982: Collapse, the Ryder Report and the Edwardes era ===
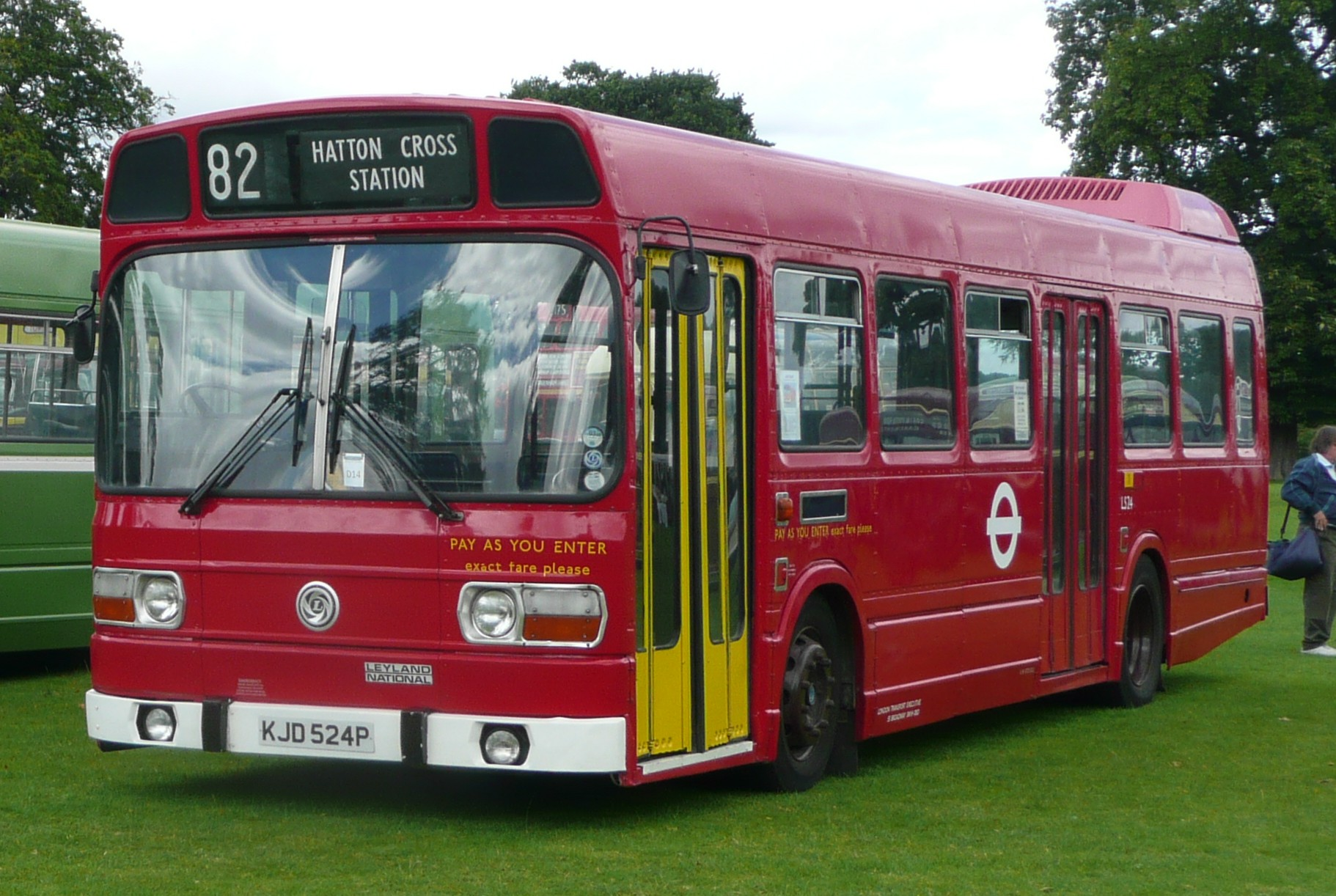
1976 Leyland National

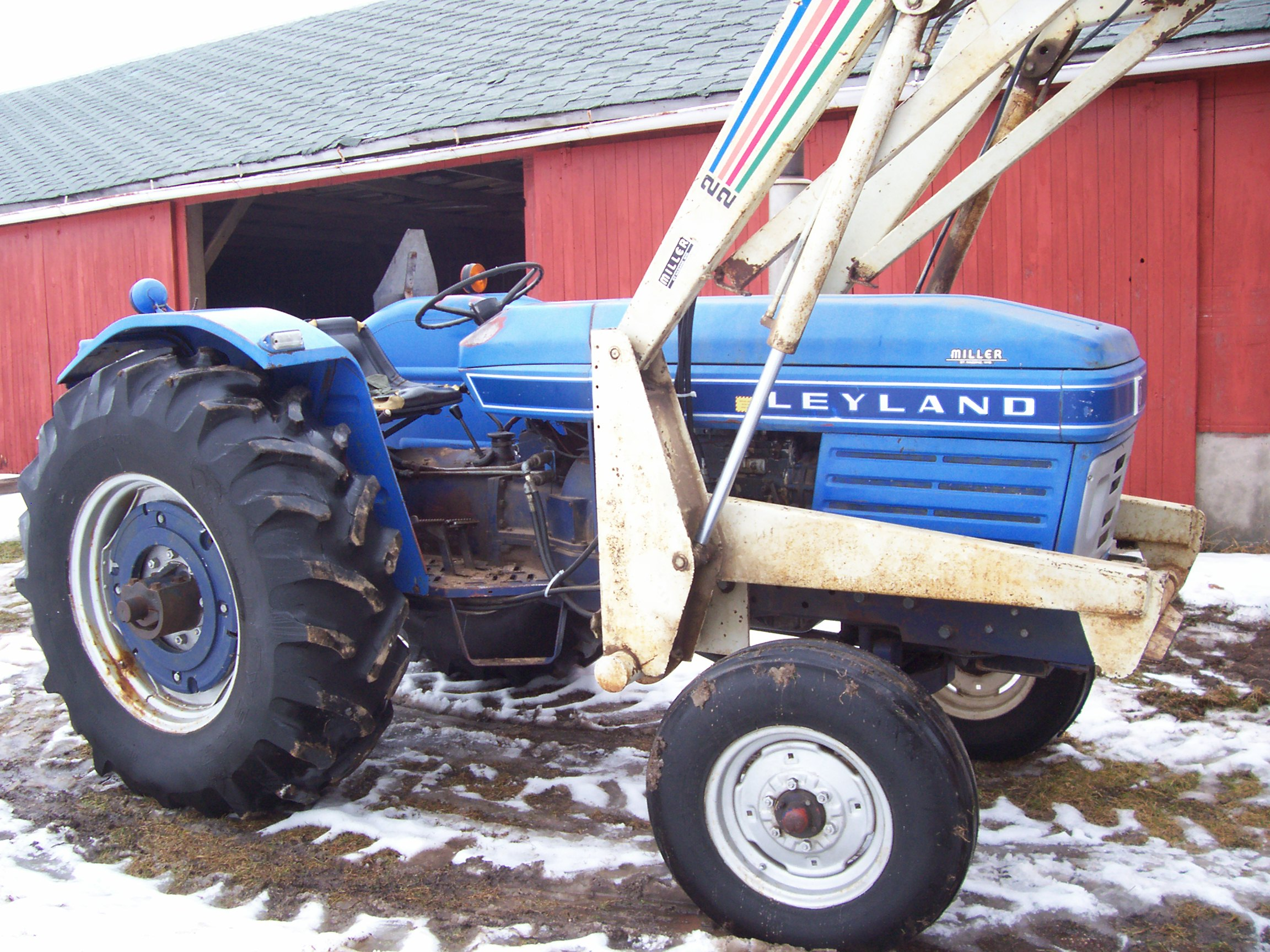
British Leyland 270 tractor fitted with aftermarket loader in the United States

Sir Don Ryder was asked to undertake an enquiry into the position of the company, and his report was presented to the government in April 1975. Following Ryder's recommendations, the organisation was drastically restructured and the Labour Government created a new holding company, British Leyland Limited (BL), of which it was the major shareholder, effectively nationalising the company. Between 1975 and 1980, these shares were vested in the National Enterprise Board which had responsibility for managing this investment. The original seven divisions of the company were now reorganised into four:

- Leyland Cars – the largest car manufacturer in the UK, employing some 128,000 people at 36 locations, and with a production capacity of one million vehicles per year.
- Leyland Truck and Bus – the largest commercial and passenger vehicle manufacturer in the UK, employing 31,000 people at 12 locations, producing 38,000 trucks, 8,000 buses (including a joint venture with the National Bus Company), and 19,000 tractors per year. The tractors were based on the Nuffield designs, but built in a plant in Bathgate, Scotland.
- Leyland Special Products – the miscellaneous collection of other acquired businesses, itself structured into five sub-divisions:
  - Construction equipment – Aveling & Porter, Aveling-Marshall, Barfords of Belton and Goodwin-Barsby
  - Refrigeration – Prestcold
  - Materials handling – Coventry Climax (incorporating Climax Trucks, Climax Conveyancer and Climax Shawloader)
  - Military vehicles – Alvis and Self-Changing Gears
  - Print – Nuffield Press (which printed the company's publications) and Lyne & Son
- Leyland International – responsible for the export of cars, trucks and buses, and responsible for manufacturing plants in Africa, India and Australia, employing 18,000 people.

1978 Rover SD1

There was positive news for BL at the end of 1976 when its new Rover SD1 executive car was voted European Car of the Year, having gained plaudits for its innovative design. The SD1 was actually the first step that British Leyland took towards rationalising its passenger car ranges, as it replaced two cars competing in the same sector, the Rover P6 and Triumph 2000. More positive news for the company came at the end of 1976 with the approval by Industry Minister Eric Varley of a £140,000,000 investment of public money in refitting the Longbridge plant for production of the company's "ADO88" (Mini replacement), due for launch in 1979. However, poor results from customer clinics of the ADO88, coupled with the UK success of the Ford Fiesta, launched in 1976, forced a snap redesign of ADO88 which evolved into the "LC8" project – eventually launched as the Austin Mini Metro in 1980.

In 1977, Michael Edwardes was appointed chief executive by the NEB. Edwardes embarked on a massive restructuring of the beleaguered conglomerate, selling off many of its non-core businesses such as Prestcold and Coventry Climax. Edwardes also took on the militant unions head-on, culminating in the dismissal of chief shop steward Derek Robinson in 1979, who had been seen as the perpetrator of much of the strikes and industrial unrest that had crippled the company throughout the decade. Edwardes quickly reversed the Ryder Report's policy of giving prominence to the "Leyland" brand, and returned focus back to the individual brands, resulting in the creation of two new completely autonomous subsidiaries:

- BL Cars Ltd - the volume cars business, which consisted of two sub divisions; namely:
  - Austin-Morris - encompassing the mainstream brands Austin, Morris and sports car brand MG.
  - Jaguar-Rover-Triumph' (JRT) - the specialist or upmarket division. Jaguar (including the Daimler) brand) regained much of its independence under former Unipart CEO John Egan, preparing it for its eventual demerger from BL in 1984.
- Land Rover Group Ltd - Land Rover (and Range Rover) were split away from Rover itself and became a completely autonomous entity, with Rover car production moved out of Solihull by 1982, which was repurposed as a Land Rover-only plant. In that same period, the commercial vehicles arm of Austin-Morris (which consisted solely of the Sherpa range of light vans), would become part of the wider Land Rover Group and was now known as Freight Rover.

At the same time the public use of the "British Leyland" name ceased due to its negative connotations, being abbreviated simply to "BL", whilst the company's "hurricane" logo was redesigned with the central "L" removed. The Austin-Morris division was given its own unique brand identity with the introduction of the blue and green "chevron" logo, which was later expanded in use when the car manufacturing operations were further consolidated into the Austin Rover Group in the 1980s.

In 1978, the company was the subject of an important legal development concerning corporate civil liability. In the case of Walton v British Leyland, the court held Leyland liable for negligence owing to a design defect in the wheel bearings of their new model of the Allegro. The company were aware of the issue but had decided against a recall. They were held liable for damages as they had failed to take reasonable care, because the costs of the recall were deemed in proportion with the potential risks of injury.

==== BLCV ====
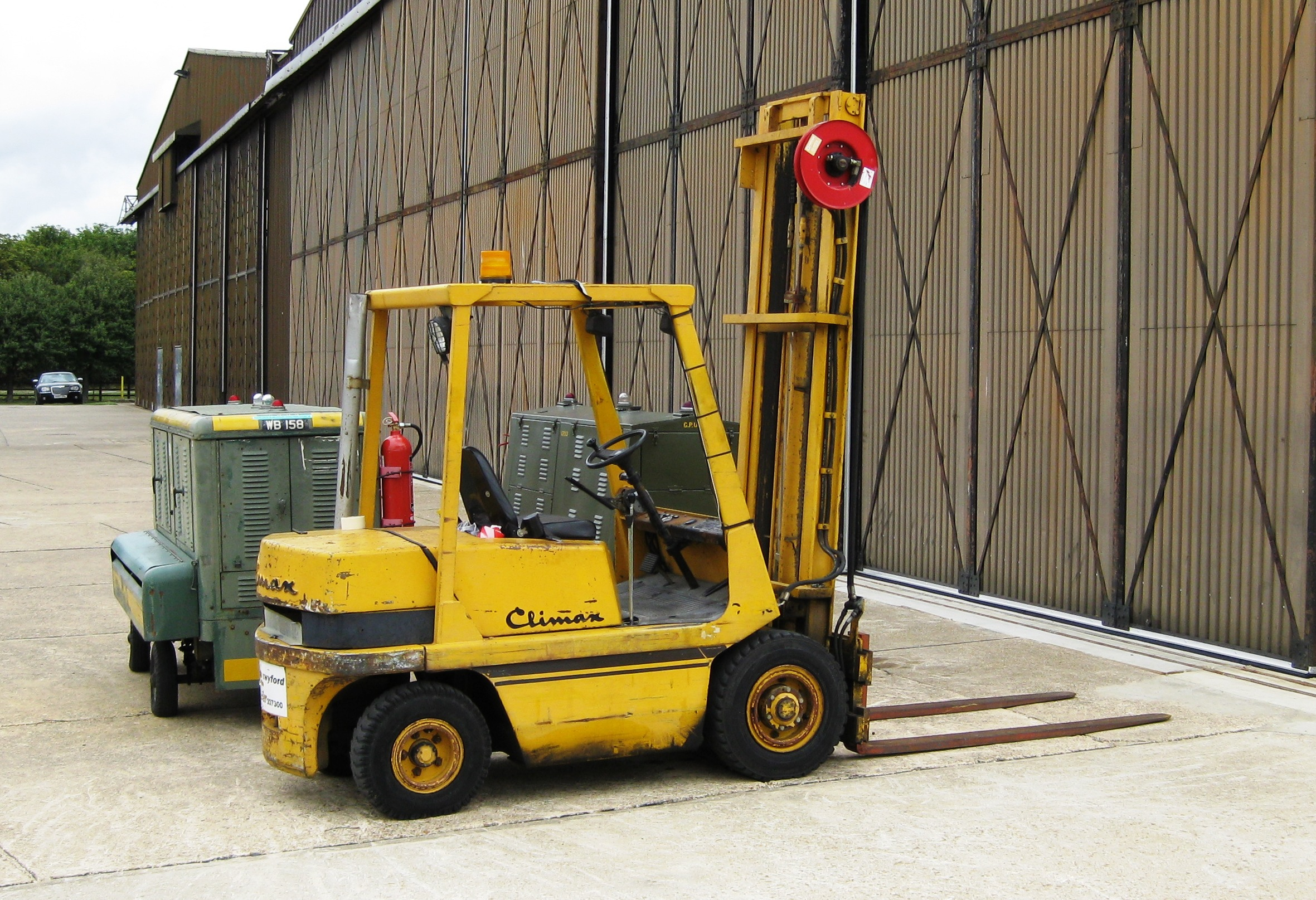
Coventry Climax forklift truck

In 1978, the company formed a new group for its commercial vehicle interests, BL Commercial Vehicles (BLCV) under managing director David Abell. The following companies moved under this new umbrella:

- Leyland Vehicles Limited (trucks, tractors and buses)
- Alvis (military vehicles)
- Coventry Climax (fork lift trucks and specialist engines)
- Self-Changing Gears (heavy-duty transmissions)

BLCV and the Land Rover Group later merged to become Land Rover Leyland.

In December 1978, British Leyland Limited was renamed BL Limited and its subsidiary, which acted as a holding company for all the other companies within the group. The British Leyland Motor Corporation Limited was renamed BLMC Limited at the same time.

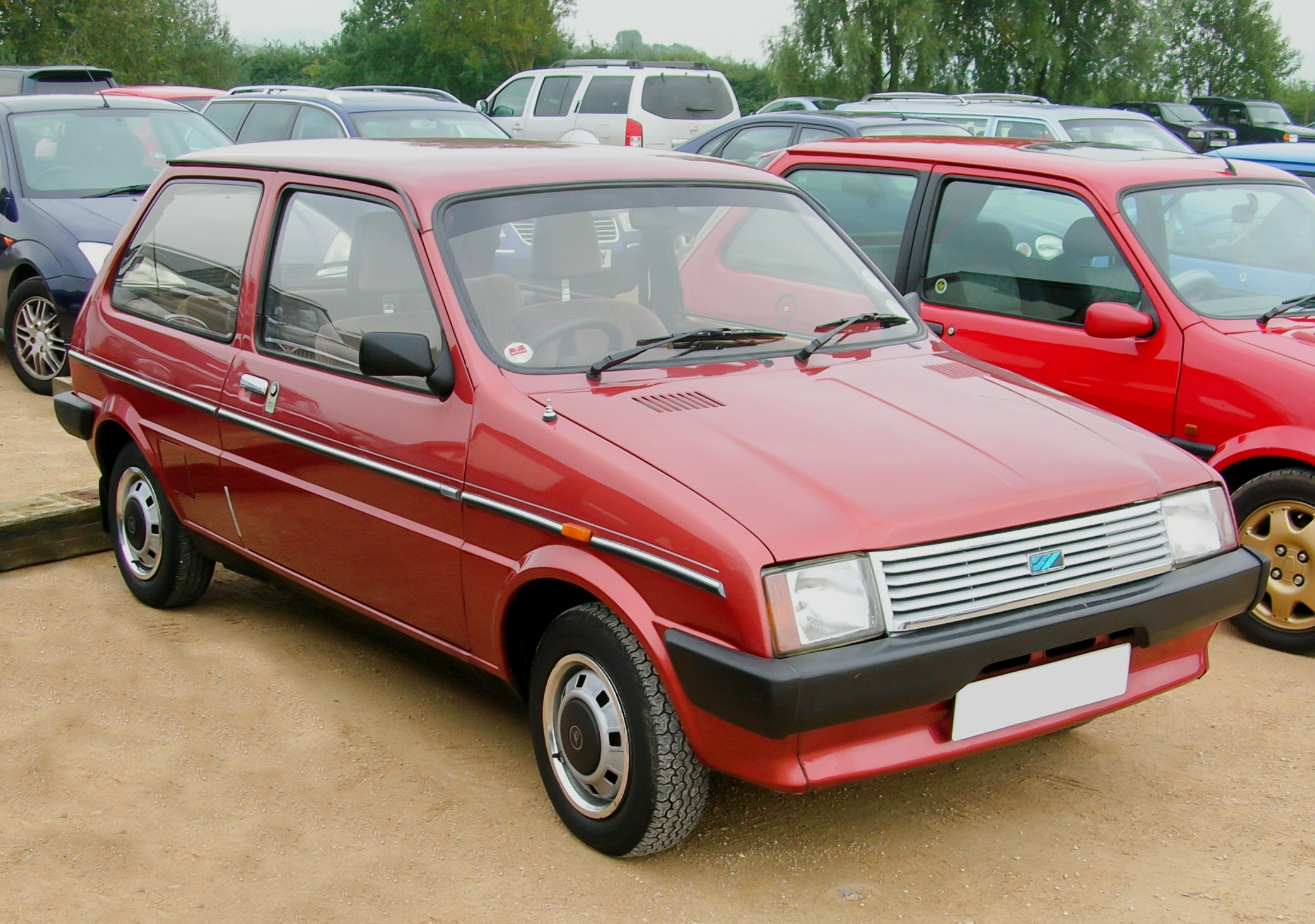
1983 Austin Metro

BL's fortunes took another much-awaited rise in October 1980 with the launch of the Austin Metro (initially named the Mini Metro), a three-door hatchback that gave buyers a more modern and practical alternative to the iconic but ageing Mini. This went on to be one of the most popular cars in Britain in the 1980s. Towards the final stages of the Metro's development, BL entered into an alliance with Honda to provide a new mid-range model to replace the ageing Triumph Dolomite, and more crucially to be a stop-gap until the Austin Maestro and Montego were ready for launch. This car emerged as the Triumph Acclaim in 1981, and became the first of a long line of collaborative models jointly developed between BL and Honda. At the same time, Leyland Trucks introduced the Landtrain, the first in a series of vehicles developed specifically for export markets.

A rationalisation of the model ranges also took place around this time. In 1980, British Leyland was still producing three cars in the large family car sector—the Princess 2, Austin Maxi and Morris Marina. The Marina was succeeded by the Morris Ital in July 1980 following a superficial facelift, and a year later the Princess 2 received a major upgrade to become the Austin Ambassador, meaning that the 1982 range had just two competitors in this sector. In April 1984, these cars were discontinued to make way for a single all-new model, the Austin Montego.

The Acclaim was replaced in that same year by another Honda-based product, the Rover 200-series.

The MG factory at Abingdon and Triumph factory at Canley were both closed in 1980.

=== 1982–1986: Edwardes steps down, Jaguar divested, Austin Rover Group ===
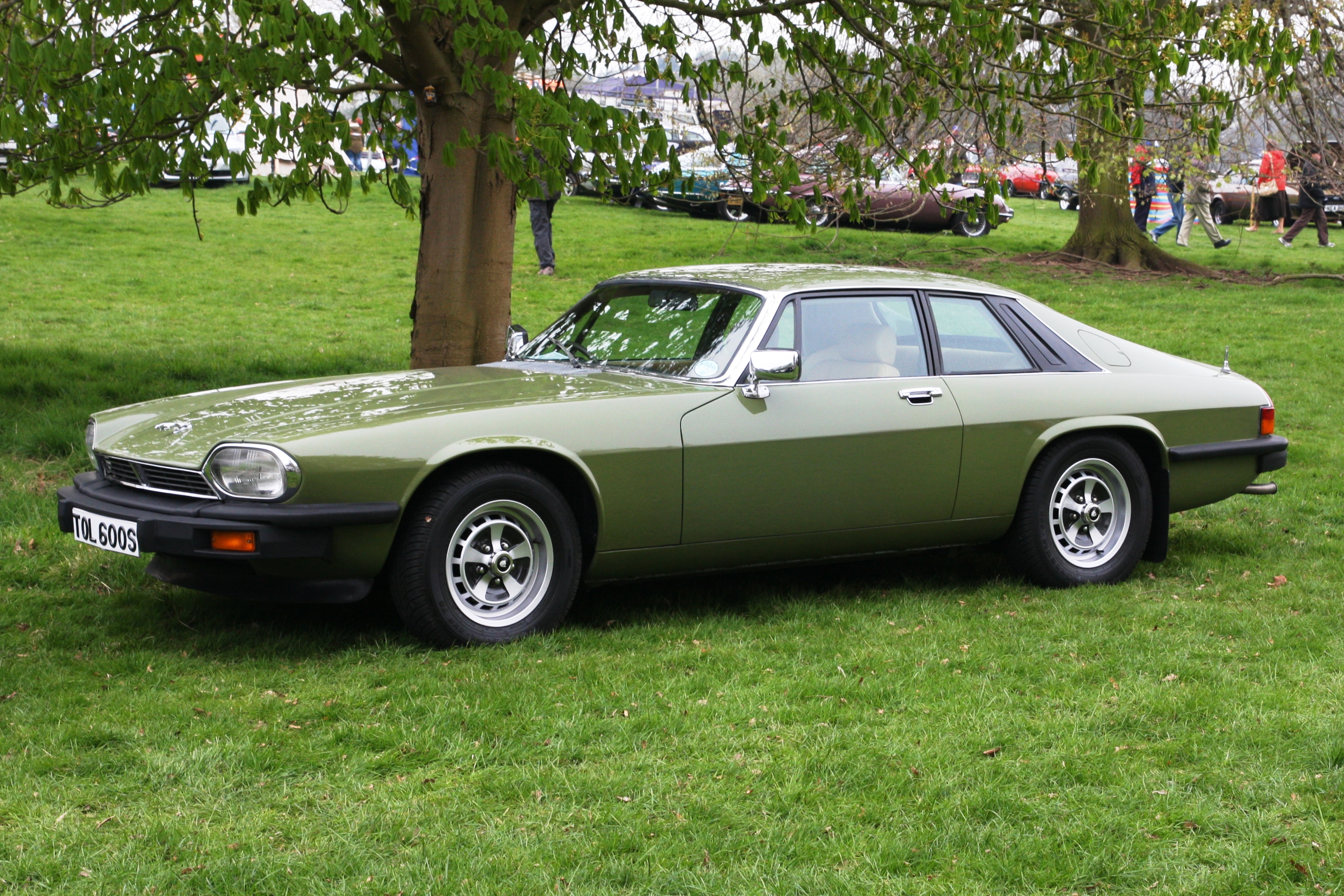
Jaguar XJ-S

By the end of Michael Edwardes' tenure as chairman of BL plc in 1982, the company had been restructured into two parts – the Cars Division (which consisted of Austin-Morris, Rover and Jaguar, and was led by Ray Horrocks) and the Commercial Vehicle Division (which consisted of Land Rover, Leyland Trucks, Leyland Buses and Freight Rover) – whose chief executive was David Andrews. The holding company BL plc was now chaired by Austin Bide in a non-executive capacity. Around this time, the BL Cars Ltd subsidiary renamed itself Austin Rover Group, shortly before the launch of the Austin Maestro and Ray Horrocks was replaced by Harold Musgrove as its chairman and chief executive.

The emergence of the Austin Rover brand was intended to give a new public face to the company (with the 'Leyland' and 'BL' names fading from public view), although the conglomerate's holding company was still known as "BL plc". The creation of Austin Rover also dispensed with the separate Austin-Morris and Jaguar-Rover-Triumph divisions, since by this time, Jaguar now resided in a separate company called Jaguar Car Holdings and was now led by Sir John Egan, and this was later de-merged from BL completely and privatised in 1984. That same year, with both the Morris Ital and the Triumph Acclaim being discontinued, their respective brands were effectively shelved, leaving only the Austin and Rover marques, whilst Land Rover moved into the Freight Rover Group alongside the light trucks division. After the divestment of Unipart and the van, truck and bus divisions in 1987 (see below), leaving just two subsidiaries – Austin Rover (volume cars) and Land Rover (SUVs) this essentially remained the basic structure of BL and subsequently the Rover Group until the 2000 break-up.

=== Renaming to Rover Group and Land Rover's eventual sale to Ford ===
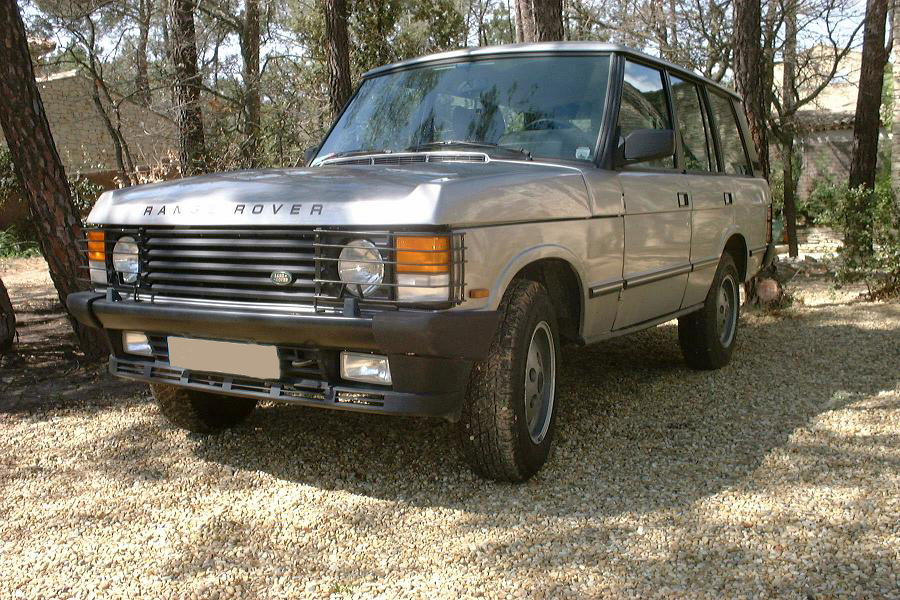
1988 Range Rover

In 1986, Graham Day took the helm as chairman and CEO and the third joint Rover-Honda vehicle – the Rover 800-series – was launched which replaced the ten-year-old Rover SD1. Around the same time, BL changed its name to Rover Group and in 1987 the Trucks Division – Leyland Vehicles merged with the Dutch DAF company to form DAF NV, trading as Leyland DAF in the UK and as DAF in the Netherlands. In 1987, the bus business was spun off into a new company called Leyland Bus. This was the result of a management buyout who decided to sell the company to the Bus & Truck division of Volvo in 1988. That same year, the British government controversially tried to privatise and sell-off Land Rover, however this plan was later abandoned. The Austin name was dropped from the Metro, Maestro and Montego by 1988, signalling the end for the historic Austin marque, in a push to focus on the more prestigious (and potentially more profitable) Rover badge. In 1988, the business was sold by the British government to British Aerospace (BAe), and shortly afterwards shortened its name to just Rover Group. It subsequently sold the business to BMW, who, after years of investment that ultimately resulted in huge losses, decided to break up the Rover Group, and only retain the Cowley operations and the rights to manufacture the new MINI family of vehicles.

Land Rover was divested to Ford, who integrated it with its Premier Automotive Group (of which Jaguar was already a part, therefore reuniting the two former BL stablemates), whilst the remains of the volume car business, including the massive Longbridge complex, became the newly independent MG Rover, which collapsed in 2005.

However, after suffering severe financial problems and teetering on the edge of bankruptcy, Ford decided to dissolve its Premier Automotive Group, and sold off most of its brands, with Jaguar and Land Rover being sold to the Indian automaker Tata Motors by the end of 2008. The only automotive manufacturing operations of British Leyland that survive today are MINI, Jaguar Land Rover, and Leyland Trucks.

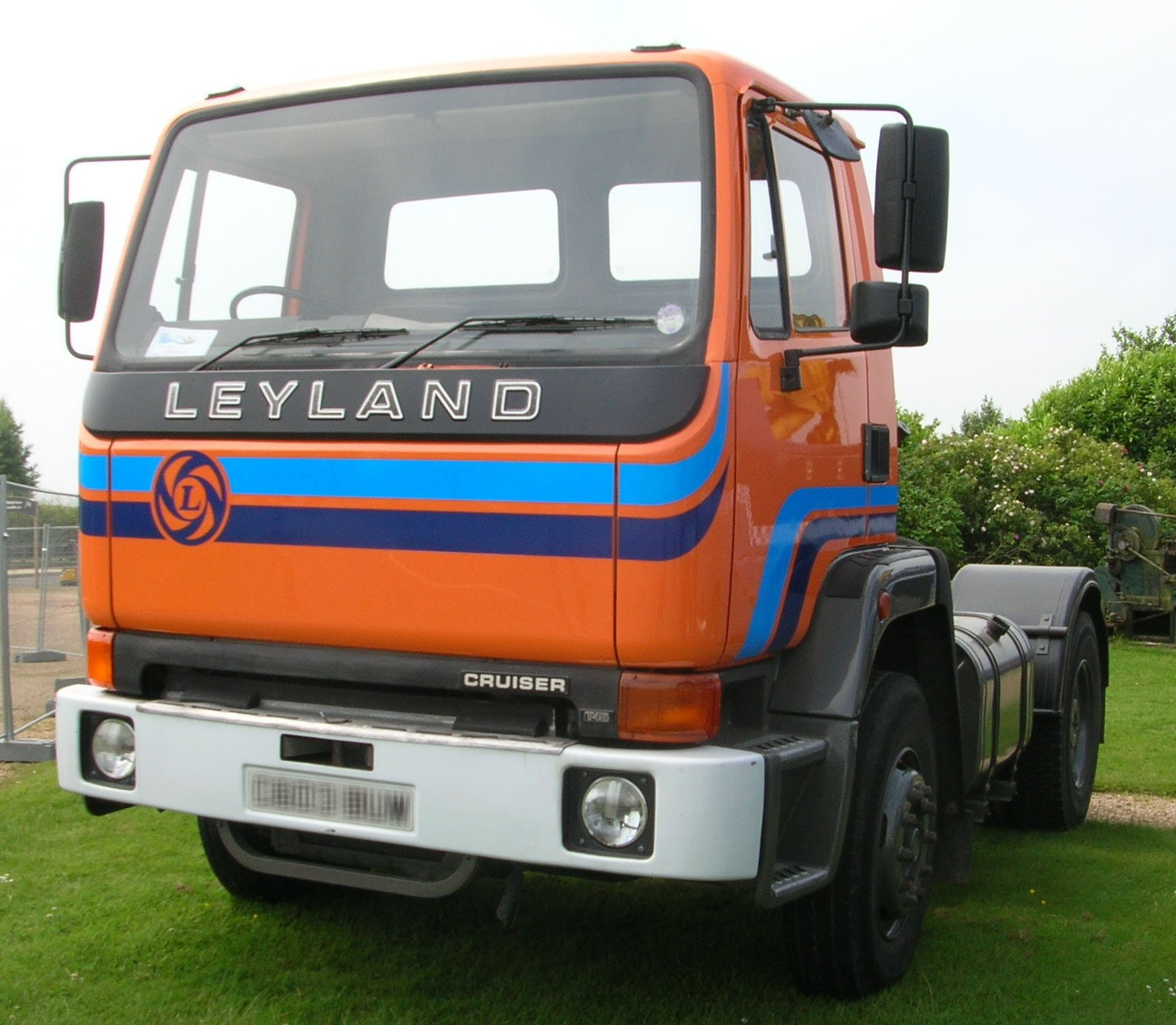
1985 Leyland T45 Cruiser

Many of the brands were divested over time and continue to exist on the books of several companies to this day.

In total, the British Government had invested over £3 billion (not adjusted for inflation) attempting to rescue British Leyland from bankruptcy.

=== Ashok Leyland ===
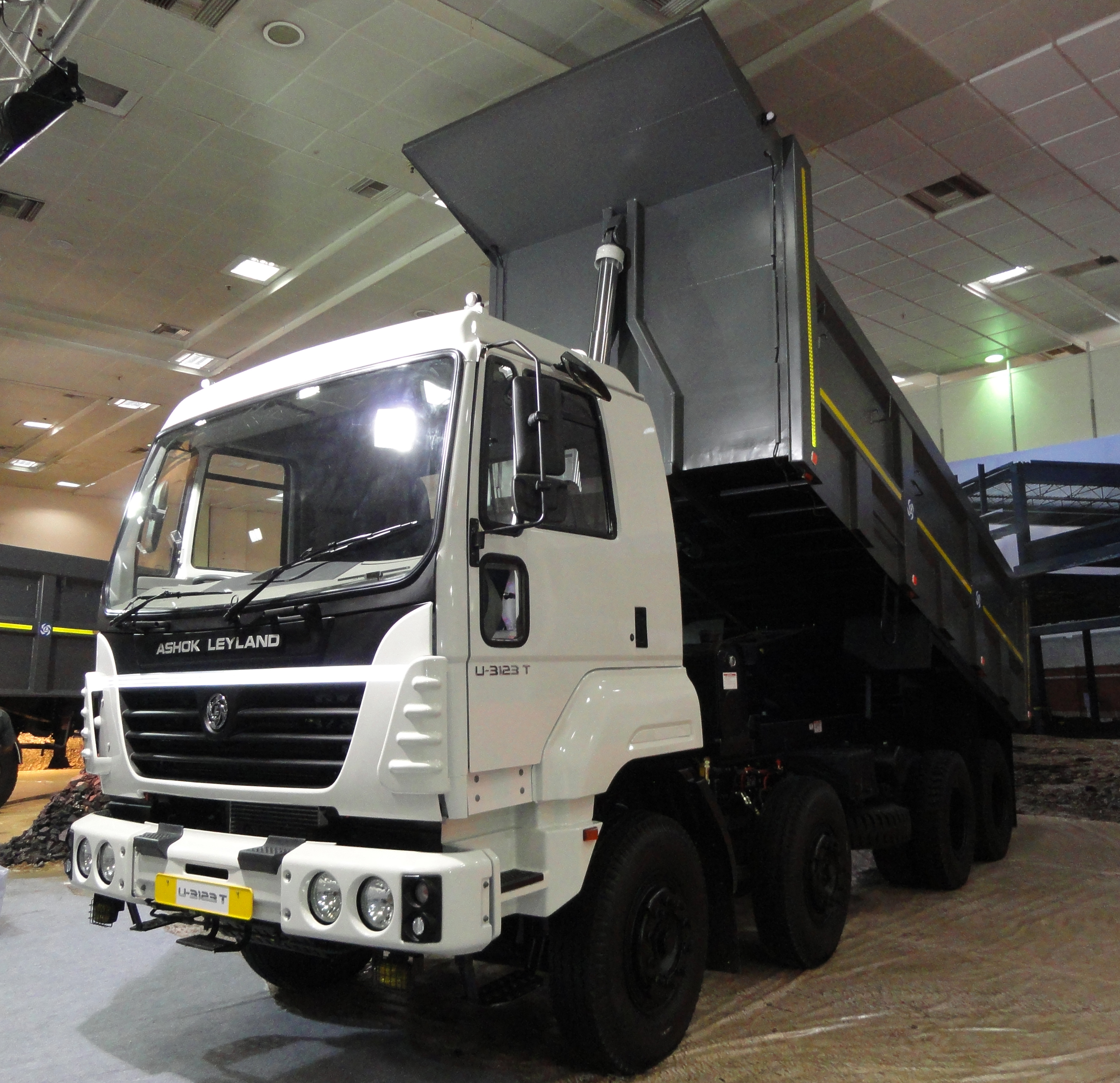
A 2010 Ashok Leyland truck in India

Until the 1980s, the Leyland name and logo were seen as a recognised and respected marque across India, the wider subcontinent and parts of Africa in the form of Ashok Leyland, a company formed from the partnership of the Ashok group and British Leyland. However, now the company has been largely Indian in its ownership for over three decades. A part of the Hinduja Group since 1987, Ashok Leyland manufactures buses, trucks, defence vehicles and engines. The company is a leader in the heavy transportation sector within India and has an aggressive expansionary policy.

In 2010, Ashok Leyland purchased a 25% stake in UK-based bus manufacturer Optare, a direct descendant of Leyland's UK bus-making division. This stake was gradually increased to 99%. In November 2020, Ashok Leyland announced that Optare would be rebranded as Switch Mobility.

After British Leyland became Austin Rover in 1982, a version of the Rover SD1 was built under licence in India as the Standard 2000 from 1985 to 1988, briefly reviving the Standard brand which had been axed in 1968.

British Leyland also provided the technical know-how and the rights to their Leyland 28 BHP tractor for Auto Tractors Limited, a tractor plant in Pratapgarh, Uttar Pradesh. Established in 1981 with state support, ATL only managed to build 2,380 tractors by the time the project was ended in 1990 – less than the planned production for the first two years. The project ended up being taken over by Sipani, who kept producing tractor engines and also a small number of tractors with some modest success.

== Timelines ==
=== Notes for the timeline table ===
- The car brands of BSA were divested, BSA was not merged into Jaguar.
- Mini was not originally a marque in its own right. See Mini and Mini (marque) for more detail.
- The BMC trademark is registered (1564704, E1118348) to MG Rover Group Ltd in the UK. BMC is also the name of a commercial vehicle manufacturer in Turkey, formerly the Turkish subsidiary of the British Motor Corporation. It is believed that Nanjing Automotive may have purchased this from MG Rover, however, the brand has not been reassigned as of 17 July 2006.
- The Wolseley trademark is registered (UK 1490228) to MG Rover Group Ltd for automobiles only. It is believed that Nanjing Automotive may have purchased this from MG Rover, however, the brand has not been reassigned as of July 2006 to a different company. The UK building materials supplier Wolseley plc owns the rights to the Wolseley name for all other purposes. Wolseley plc is a descendant of the original Wolseley company.
- The Vanden Plas trademark is owned by Ford (through Jaguar) for use within the US and Canada, and as (UK 1133528, E2654481) to MG Rover Group Ltd for use in the rest of the world. It is believed that Nanjing Automotive may have purchased this from MG Rover, however, the trademark has not been recorded as reassigned as of 17 July 2006. This is why Jaguar XJ Vanden Plas models are branded as Daimlers in Britain. The last Rover to use the Vanden Plas name was the Rover 75 Vanden Plas, a long wheelbase limousine model.
- The Rover trademark was owned by BMW and was only licensed to MG Rover Group Ltd. BMW sold the brand to Ford in September 2006.
- Alvis was purchased from British Leyland by United Scientific Holdings in 1981, in 2002 Alvis merged with part of Vickers Defence Systems to form Alvis Vickers which was purchased by BAE Systems in 2004. BAE Systems did not acquire Alvis through their ownership of the Rover Group in the early 1990s. Production of Alvis branded cars ceased in 1967. The trademark is owned by Alvis Vehicles Ltd.
- The use of the Triumph name as a trademark for vehicles is shared between BMW and Triumph Motorcycles. The former for automobiles and the latter for motorcycles. The motorcycle and car business separated in the 1930s.

=== Inherited marques ===
The car marques inherited by the company are as follows.

The dates given are those of the first car of each marque, but these are often debatable as each car may be several years in development.

- 1895 Wolseley
- 1896 Lanchester
- 1896 Leyland Motors (commercial vehicles)
- 1896 Daimler
- 1898 Riley
- 1899 Albion
- 1903 Standard
- 1904 Rover
- 1905 Austin
- 1912 Morris
- 1913 Vanden Plas
- 1919 Alvis
- 1923 MG
- 1923 Triumph
- 1924 BSA used as a car brand
- 1935 Jaguar
- 1947 Land Rover
- 1952 Austin-Healey created by Austin division of BMC (see below)
- 1959 Mini: the car initially launched as the Austin Seven and Morris Mini-Minor became popularly known as just the 'Mini'. BMC recognised this by rebadging the Austin as the Austin Mini. British Leyland deleted both marque names from the car and created Mini as a marque in its own right in 1969.

=== Marques retired ===
- 1969 – The last Riley Elf, 1300, and 4/72 models were built, thus ending the Riley marque.
- 1975 – The final Wolseley, a saloon, was built, thus ending the Wolseley marque.
- 1980 – Vanden Plas was discontinued as a marque name but remains as a trim level name on selected models of other marques.
- 1982 – The Princess marque, launched in 1975, was discontinued upon the launch of the Austin Ambassador.
- 1984 – The Morris Ital goes out of production, signalling the end of the Morris marque.
- 1984 – The final Triumph Acclaim rolled off the production line, ending the Triumph marque.
- 1987 – The Austin marque retired, although the existing Metro, Maestro and Montego models continued without a marque name. The Metro was revised and relaunched as a Rover in 1990.

=== Merger events ===
Several of these names (including Jaguar, Land Rover and Mini) are now in other hands. The history of the mergers and other key events is as follows.

Pre-BL:

- 1910 Daimler merged with the BSA car armaments and motorcycles company BSA (last BSA car, 1939).
- 1931 Lanchester purchased by BSA/Daimler (last Lanchester 1956).
- 1938 Morris Motors bought Wolseley and Riley. From 1943 they were jointly called the Nuffield Organization.
- 1944 Standard bought Triumph, forming Standard Triumph.
- 1946 Austin bought Vanden Plas.
- 1951 Leyland Motors bought the share capital of Albion Motors.
- 1952 Morris and Austin merged to form the British Motor Corporation (BMC).
- 1955 Leyland Motors acquired Scammell Lorries Limited of Watford.
- 1960 Jaguar bought Daimler for the latter's production facilities.
- 1961 Leyland Motors bought Standard Triumph.
- 1962 Leyland Motors bought Associated Commercial Vehicles, the renamed AEC (Associated Equipment Company) company.
- 1963 Jaguar bought the engine and fork lift truck manufacturing company Coventry Climax.
- 1965 Rover bought Alvis/
- 1965 BMC bought Pressed Steel, a car body manufacturer supplying bodies to many British car firms including Jaguar, Rover, etc.
- 1966 Jaguar merged with BMC creating British Motor Holdings (BMH) as the holding company of BMC Ltd, Pressed Steel Fisher Ltd and Jaguar Cars Ltd.
- 1967 Leyland Motors bought the Rover Company
- 1968 Leyland Motors merged with BMH to form the British Leyland Motor Corporation (BLMC).

As BL:

- 1969 Joint venture with the National Bus Company to build Leyland National buses, and also to continue to manufacture Bristol buses and Eastern Coach Works bodies previously built by NBC.
- 1970s Majority stake in Danish partner DAB, to form Leyland-DAB, producer of the Leyland-DAB articulated bus.
- 1972 BLMC took control of Innocenti.
- 1974 End of production of cars by BLMC's Australian subsidiary.
- 1974 Unipart, originally established as a division in 1969 is now created as an independent subsidiary company, wholly owned by BLMC.
- 1975 Publication of the Ryder Report: British Leyland effectively was nationalised due to financial difficulties, with the formation of a new holding company, British Leyland Ltd, later BL plc, with the government as the principal (but not the only) shareholder.
- 1977 Michael Edwardes appointed as chairman by the third Wilson Government. He began a massive cull of excess BL assets.
- 1982 BL bought out National Bus Company from the bus plant joint venture.

=== Divestments ===
As BL:

- 1975 Innocenti passed to Alejandro de Tomaso.
- 1981 Alvis sold to United Scientific Holdings and Alvis plc formed.
- 1981 Prestcold, the industrial refrigerator manufacturer is sold to Suter plc. Assets now owned by Emerson Electric.
- 1982 Coventry Climax was demerged as a stand-alone company.
- 1982 Leyland Tractors was sold to Marshall Tractors. Tractor production at Bathgate assembly plant ended.
- 1984 Jaguar floated off, including Daimler and the US rights to Vanden Plas). Ford bought Jaguar in 1989.

After BL:

- 1986 Leyland Bus floated off; bought by Volvo in 1988
- 1987 Leyland Trucks division (including Freight Rover vans) merged with DAF to form DAF NV/Leyland DAF. Vans became independent as LDV in 1993, as did Trucks as Leyland Trucks. Leyland Trucks was taken over by US giant Paccar in 1998 and integrated with Foden Trucks.
- 1987 Unipart, BL's spare parts division, was acquired by management buyout.
- 1988 Rover Group plc is privatised; sold to British Aerospace, and renamed itself Rover Group Car Holdings Ltd; its two remaining subsidiaries being Austin Rover and Land Rover.
- 1994 Rover Group Car Holdings Ltd sold to BMW; collaboration with Honda ended.
- 2000 BMW decided to break up and sell the Rover empire; Land Rover sold to Ford.
- 2000 Remainder of company became independent as the MG Rover Group.
- 2008 Ford completed the sale of Jaguar, Rover, and Land Rover to Tata Motors, of India.

=== Plant closures ===
- 1978 Closure of Triumph assembly plant in Speke – production moved to Canley.
- 1980 Closure of MG and Triumph assembly plants in Abingdon and Canley.
- 1981 Closure of Rover-Triumph plant in Solihull. The first joint venture car with Honda; the Triumph Acclaim; went into production at Cowley.
- 1982 Production of British Leyland cars in New Zealand ceased.
- 1983 Bristol bus factory closed; production transferred to Leyland National plant at Workington.
- 1985 Closure of Bathgate truck assembly plant. Bathgate narrowly avoided closure in 1981, but instead became responsible for engine production and export market trucks. Leyland's truck exports then collapsed as oil prices dropped, making the end inevitable.

=== Other key events ===
As BL:

- 1978 A further reorganisation saw Land Rover separated from Rover, and established as a stand-alone company within BL. Leyland Cars Ltd was renamed BL Cars Ltd, and is split into two divisions: Austin Morris and Jaguar Rover Triumph.
- 1979 Collaboration with Honda began, and Derek Robinson was dismissed.
- 1981 Founding of Freight Rover (as part of the Land Rover Group), the former light commercial vehicle arm of Austin-Morris.
- 1982 Michael Edwardes steps down as chairman; BL Cars Ltd renamed Austin Rover (ARG).
- 1986 BL plc renamed Rover Group.

After BL:

- 1989 The mass market car subsidiary, still named Austin Rover Group Ltd, shortened its name to simply Rover Group Ltd – thus ending the use of the Austin brand in the public domain.
- 1994 Maestro and Montego production ceased.
- 1997 Metro/100-series production ceased – the last of the former Austin models.
- 2000 BMW retained the Mini, Triumph, and Riley trademarks, but sold off its other interests.
- 2005 MG Rover went into administration with huge debts, and its assets were taken over by Nanjing Automobile (Nanjing Automobile Corporation, NAC).
- 2007 SAIC took over NAC and relaunched production at Longbridge.
- 2006 Ford acquired the rights to the Rover brand name from BMW, but without any immediate plan to use it on production cars.

=== BL and BMC and related models ===
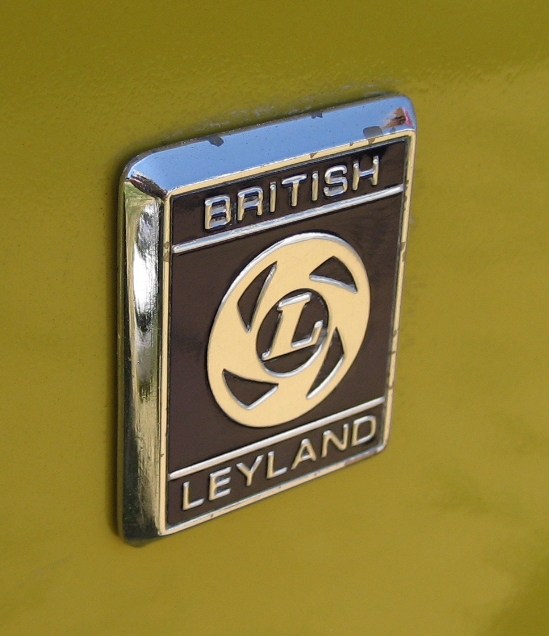
A small British Leyland "hurricane" badge on one of its many products

- 1948 Land Rover (Rover)
- 1948 Morris Minor (Nuffield)
- 1949 Rover P4 (60/75/90 etc. models) (Rover)
- 1952 Morris Oxford MO (BMC)
- 1954 Austin Cambridge (BMC)
- 1958 Austin Healey Sprite (BMC)
- 1959 Triumph Herald (Standard-Triumph)
- 1959 Austin Gipsy (BMC)
- 1959 Mini (BMC; Initially badged as the Morris Mini-Minor and later Austin Se7en then Austin Mini)
- 1961 Jaguar E-type (Jaguar)
- 1961 Riley Elf (BMC)
- 1961 Wolseley Hornet (BMC)
- 1961 MG Midget (BMC)
- 1962 Triumph Spitfire (Leyland-Triumph)
- 1962 Morris 1100 (BMC)
- 1962 MG MGB (BMC)
- 1963 Triumph 2000 (Leyland-Triumph)
- 1963 Rover 2000 (Rover)
- 1964 Mini Moke (BMC)
- 1964 Austin 1800/2200 (BMC)
- 1968 Jaguar XJ6 (BLMC)
- 1969 Austin Maxi (BLMC)
- 1970 Triumph Toledo (BLMC)
- 1970 Triumph Stag (BLMC)
- 1970 Range Rover (BLMC)
- 1971 Morris Marina (BLMC)
- 1972 Triumph Dolomite (BLMC)
- 1973 Austin Allegro (BLMC)
- 1973 Leyland P76 (Leyland Motor Corporation of Australia)
- 1974 Sherpa/Leyland Van (BLMC)
- 1975 Princess (BL)
- 1975 Triumph TR7 (BL)
- 1975 Jaguar XJS (BL)
- 1976–1986: Rover SD1 (BL)
- 1980–1990: Austin Metro (BL)
- 1980–1984: Morris Ital (BL)
- 1981 Triumph Acclaim (BL)
- 1982 Austin Ambassador (ARG)
- 1983 Austin Maestro (ARG)
- 1984 Austin Montego (ARG)
- 1984 Rover 200-series (ARG)
- 1986 Rover 800-series/Sterling (ARG)

=== Competing models ===
In some cases, British Leyland continued to produce competing models from the merged companies at different sites for many years. However, any benefits from the broader number of models were far outweighed by higher development costs and greatly reduced economies of scale.

Potential benefits associated with rationalising parts usage were lost, as for example, the company made two completely different 1.3-litre engines (BMC A series and the Triumph 1.3-litre), two different 1.5-litre engines (BMC E series and Triumph), four different 2-litre engines (4-cylinder O series, 4-cylinder Triumph Dolomite, 4-cylinder Rover and 6-cylinder Triumph) and two completely different V8 engines (Triumph OHC 3-litre V8 and Rover 3.5-litre V8).

Examples of competing cars were:

- Morris Minor and Austin A40/Austin 1100
- Austin 1300 and Triumph Herald/Triumph Toledo
- Morris Marina, Austin Allegro, and Triumph Dolomite
- Triumph 2000, Rover 2000, and Princess (car)
- Triumph Spitfire, MG Midget and Austin-Healey Sprite
- Triumph TR6/Triumph TR7 and MG MGC
- Rover 3500 and Jaguar XJ6

=== Badge-engineered models ===
In contrast to the continued development of competing models, British Leyland continued the practice of badge engineering of models which had started under BMC; selling essentially the same vehicle under two (or more) different marques.

- Riley One-Point-Five/Wolseley 1500
- MG Magnette ZA/ZB/Wolseley 4/44
- MG Magnette ZB/Wolseley 15/50
- Morris Oxford MO/Wolseley 4/50
- Morris Six/Wolseley 6/80
- Austin A99 Westminster/Wolseley 6/99
- Austin A110 Westminster/Wolseley 6/110
- Austin 1800/Morris 1800/Wolseley 18/85
- Austin 2200/Morris 2200/Wolseley Six
- Austin A55 Cambridge/MG Magnette Mk. III/Morris Oxford V/Riley 4/68/Wolseley 15/60
- Austin A60 Cambridge/MG Magnette Mk. IV/Morris Oxford Farina VI/Riley 4/72/Wolseley 16/60
- Riley Pathfinder/Riley Two-Point-Six/Wolseley 6/90
- Austin Se7en/Morris Mini-Minor
- Morris Mini Traveller/Austin Mini Countryman
- Riley Elf/Wolseley Hornet
- Austin 1100/Austin 1300/Morris 1100/Morris 1300/MG 1100/Riley Kestrel/Riley 1300/Vanden Plas Princess/Wolseley 1100
- Austin-Healey Sprite/MG Midget

== Factories ==
=== Volume car production plants ===
- Abingdon, Oxfordshire. The MG sports car plant. Closed in 1980 and some of the site was demolished for redevelopment
- Bargoed. This small plant was set up by Austin in 1949, with government funding, to employ 250 ex-miners suffering from pneumoconiosis, It made small metal pressings such as dashboard parts, car registration plates and rocker covers. It closed as late as 1999, by then employing just 45.
- Birmingham Adderley Park. Originally the main Wolseley assembly plant (until 1927), then the main Morris Commercial assembly plant, latterly for vans only. Closed in 1972, when van assembly transferred to nearby Common Lane.
- Birmingham Acocks Green, Rover engine and transmissions plant using casting supplies by West Yorkshire Foundries. Closed 1983.
- Birmingham Castle Bromwich, Former Fisher and Ludlow body plant, acquired by BMC in 1953. Functioned as body plant for Mini and Jaguar models, employing c9,000 workers in the 1970s, Plant taken over completely by Jaguar in 1977, and became the main Jaguar assembly plant after the closure of the Browns Lane Coventry plant in 2005. The plant still employs 2,000 workers and is the last car plant left in the City of Birmingham.
- Birmingham Cofton Hackett, Engine plant built in 1968 adjacent to Longbridge to produce the E-Series engine for the Austin Maxi and later the Allegro. Became part of Rover Powertrain following the creation of MG Rover in 2000, but was closed and demolished following the 2005 collapse.
- Birmingham Drews Lane / Common Lane. Also known as the Ward End works. The Plant dated from 1913 and was built by Electric & Ordnance Accessories, a subsidiary of Vickers. Was then a Wolseley assembly plant (until 1948), later a component plant, and in 1968 the main Austin-Morris Division's transmission plant. In 1972 the Common Lane section it became BLMC's main van assembly plant when the Adderley Park plant was closed. Van production was suspended in 2008 and did not resume, due to the collapse of the LDV Group. The plant was subsequently demolished for redevelopment.
- Birmingham Garrison Street, Bordesley Green, c800 workers making Triumph components. Formerly Forward Radiators. Closed
- Birmingham Longbridge. Originally the Austin plant, and at one time the largest manufacturing plant in the world. The largest British car plant in the 1970s, employing c25,000 workers and famous as the home of the Mini. It was divided into North, East, south and West works, with the South works being the oldest. The Mini Metro was built at a brnd new part of the West Works. Closed upon the collapse of MG Rover in 2005. Two-thirds of the plant has now been demolished and cleared for new uses. Successor Nanjing restarted limited car assembly on a much smaller scale for the MG TF but stopped production in 2016 and is now an R&D centre for SAIC.
- Birmingham Percy Road, Rover gearboxes, Closed in 1982 with the loss of 300 jobs after the Ryder Plan and work transferred to Triumph Canley
- Birmingham Perry Barr, Rover transmissions and axles. Closed after the Ryder Plan and work transferred to Triumph Canley
- Birmingham SU Carburettors. Bought by Morris and established at Washwood Heath, making fuel pumps and carburettors (c1,300 workers). Closed early 1980s
- Birmingham Tyseley, Rover engine and transmission plant, employing c4,000 workers in the 1970s. Closed mid-1980s when there were still 1,100 employed there.
- Birmingham Tyburn Road, Rover general components, Closed after the Ryder Plan and work transferred to Triumph Canley
- Cardiff. Opened by Rover in 1964 to manufacture transmissions and axles for Rover and Land Rover vehicles. Closed in November 1984, following major rationalisation of production facilities within the Austin Rover Group. All facilities corresponding to Land Rover output were transferred to Solihull East Works on cessation of Rover SD1 production.
- Cowley, Oxford. Formerly comprising the main Morris plant and the Pressed Steel Fisher body plant, and one of the largest British car production sites throughout the BLMC era. In 1993 the North and South Works at the original Morris plant was sold to developers and demolished, with car production being concentrated on the former Pressed Steel site which is now owned by BMW and used for assembly of the modern Mini. BL's spare parts and logistics division Unipart also had its headquarters at Cowley - this has also largely survived to the present day and is still in operation as a standalone company.
- Oxford Bainton Road. Originally Osberton Radiators, then became the Morris Radiators factory. Later the factory became part of the Unipart Group and it closed in 2001.
- Coventry Courthouse Green engine plant. Formerly Morris Engines Ltd., closed in June 1982 when 1,500 still worked there, a far cry from the 5,000 employed there in 1970. The original Gosford Street building is now the Coventry University Business School's William Morris Building.
- Coventry Browns Lane. Originally a World War II Shadow factory, built for Daimler, which subsequently became the main Jaguar assembly plant. Closed by Ford in 2005. It was demolished and is now a housing development.
- Coventry Canley. Originally owned by Standard, latterly the main Triumph car plant and the largest factory in the city. It also incorporated two subsidiary works, Fletchamstead North (experimental area and drawing office) and Fletchamstead South (gearboxes and engine drive train). Closed in September 1980. Plant demolished in 1993 and sold for redevelopment.
- Coventry Radford. Former Daimler plant. Bus chassis assembly transferred to Leyland 1973, subsequently the Jaguar engine and axle plant. Closed by Ford in the late 1990s.
- Coventry Tile Hill - the main Triumph body plant. It closed in August 1980, just before Canley Assembly. Opened by Fisher & Ludlow in 1937. Standard-Triumph wanted to expand on a large scale here even including a 2.5 mile long conveyor to take car bodies to Canley. But they were forced by government regional policy to go to Speke, Liverpool instead. A damaging decision since it imposed extra transportation and logistical costs on Triumph.
- Coventry Quinton Road. This was a former Pressed Steel Fisher plant making bodies for Morris. In 1969 MG body work was switched to Abingdon, and with bodies for the aging Morris Traveller the only work left, it was closed in 1970 with the loss of 500 jobs.Leeds
- Coventry Clay Lane. This was a small plant making Land Rover chassis components and employing 200 people. Closed 1981 and work transferred to Solihull.
- Dunstable. Tool and Die, a small factory employing c200 and making body press dies. Closure date unknown
- Leicester Rearsby Components plant, formerly the assembly plant for Auster Aircraft. Closed by British Leyland in 1981, subject to a management buyout, passed to Adwest and closed in 2003.
- Leicester Syston. A small components plant which closed in 1981 alongside Rearsby Components
- Leeds. West Yorkshire Foundries. around 1,000 workers making engine block castings to be machined in the Midlands engine plants, Eventually sold off by BL, rebranded as Hydro Aluminium Motorcast by its new owners - Norsk Hydro - and closed 2004.
- Liverpool Speke. Former Hall Engineering Group car body plant purchased by Standard-Triumph in 1959 (Speke No.1), plus new Triumph assembly plant opened in 1970 (Speke No.2). No.2 plant became the first major British BLMC car assembly plant to close, in 1978. No.1 plant continued to produce bodies for assembly at Canley until closure in 1981. The No.1 factory was demolished and houses have been built on the site whilst No.2 site remains and has been split into individual industrial units.
- Llanelli. Radiator plant. Began as a Morris shadow factory in 1943 and employing c 4,000 workers in the 1970s. Sold to its management in 1987 and now owned by Calsonic Llanelli Radiators.
- Llanelli. Pressings. This was an ex Pressed Steel Fisher plant, with 1,500 workers making a wide range of light pressings for the assembly plants at Longbridge and Cowley. Sold to Camford engineering in 1990. This became Krupp Camford and closed in 2012.
- Solihull, West Midlands. The former Rover plant. Became a Land Rover-only plant in 1981 when Rover SD1 production was moved to the Cowley plant. Survives as a Jaguar Land Rover plant, now owned by TATA Motors and still employing 9,000 workers.
- Swindon. Former Pressed Steel Company bodywork plant, now owned by BMW for manufacture of Mini body panels.
- Tipton. Beans Industries. Until a receivership in 1932, Beans Industries were fully fledged car manufacturers. It revived as a specialist foundry and was bought by Standard Triumph in 1956, making vehicle castings,ranging from flywheels, brake drums, manifolds and gearboxes to castings for cylinder blocks, cylinder heads, and crankcases. Sold by Leyland to its management in 1988, then became Ferrotech before being brought down by the Rover collapse, causing closure in September 2005.
- Wellingborough. Foundry established by Morris in 1947 and which employed 600 people. Closed in 1981 and the work transferrred to Beans at Tipton.

=== Truck and bus plants ===
- Alcester, Warwickshire. Former Maudslay plant, latterly making AEC dump trucks. Sold in the early 1970s.
- Basingstoke, Hampshire. Former Thornycroft plant, latterly a specialist heavy truck plant. Closed in 1969.
- Bathgate, West Lothian. A new plant opened by BMC in 1961 to manufacture light trucks and tractors. Tractor assembly ended in 1982, following the sale to Marshall Tractors who transferred production to Gainsborough, Lincolnshire. The truck assembly ceased in 1985, and the plant closed in 1986.
- Brislington, Bristol. Former Bristol Commercial Vehicles bus plant, initially 25% owned, from 1969 50% owned, from 1982 100% owned. Closed 1983.
- Cross Gates, Leeds. Charles H Roe bus bodywork plant. Closed by Leyland in 1984, but reopened in 1985 as Optare bus plant. Closed in 2011 when replaced by a new factory at Sherburn-in-Elmet.
- Fallings Park, Wolverhampton. Former Guy truck and bus plant. Closed in 1982.
- Holyhead Road, Coventry. Former Alvis plant, latterly producing military vehicles. Closed by Alvis plc and demolished in 1992; the site is now the Alvis Retail Park.
- Kingsbury Lane, London. The Vanden Plas limousine factory, latterly used to assemble the Daimler DS420, additional trimming of the Daimler badged derivatives of the Jaguar XJ and for completing the Vanden Plas versions of the Austin Allegro. Closed in 1979.
- Leyland, Lancashire. Former Leyland Motors truck and bus plant. Bus production (under Volvo ownership) ceased 1991. Truck manufacturing continues under Paccar ownership.
- Lillyhall (Workington), Cumbria. Bus plant opened 1970, initially (until 1982) as a joint venture between BLMC and the National Bus Company to build the Leyland National bus. Closed by Volvo 1993, although most of the buildings survive and are now used by other organisations.
- Lowestoft, Suffolk. Eastern Coach Works bus bodywork plant, initially 25% owned, from 1969 50% owned, from 1982 100% owned. Closed 1986.
- Park Royal, London. Park Royal Vehicles bus bodywork plant. Closed 1980.
- Scotstoun, Glasgow. Former Albion truck and bus plant. Vehicle assembly ceased in 1980, but became an axle plant. Now owned by American Axle.
- Southall, London. Former AEC bus and truck plant. Closed 1979.
- Watford, Hertfordshire. Former Scammell plant building specialist heavy trucks. Closed 1988.

== See also ==
- Nationalised industries
- Amalgamated Drawing Office (ADO)
