= British Motor Holdings =

British vehicle manufacturing company

British Motor Holdings Limited
- Industry: Automotive
- Predecessor: Morris Motors Limited; Austin Motor Company Limited; Pressed Steel Company Ltd; Jaguar Cars Limited
- Founded: 14 December 1966
- Founder: George Harriman
- Defunct: 17 January 1968
- Fate: Merged in 1968 with Leyland Motor Corporation
- Successor: British Leyland Motor Corporation
- Headquarters: Longbridge, Birmingham, England, UK
- Key people: Sir George Harriman (Chairman)

British Motor Holdings Limited (BMH) was a British vehicle manufacturing company known until 14 December 1966 as British Motor Corporation Limited (BMC). BMH was created as a holding company following BMC's takeover of both Jaguar Cars and the Pressed Steel Company in that year.

Thirteen months later, on 17 January 1968, under direct pressure from its national government, BMH merged with Leyland Motor Corporation (Standard-Triumph, Rover and Alvis cars, Leyland trucks and buses, Alvis fighting vehicles) to form British Leyland Motor Corporation (BLMC).

== History ==
=== 1964 The Wilson government takes control ===
The Wilson Labour Government (1964–1970) came to power at a time when British manufacturing industry was in decline and decided that the remedy was to promote more mergers, particularly in the motor industry. Chrysler was already buying into the Rootes Group, Leyland Motors had acquired Standard Triumph in 1961 (and would buy Rover in 1967) and had become a major automotive force. The British Motor Corporation (BMC) was suffering a dramatic drop in its share of the home market. Tony Benn, appointed Minister of Technology in July 1966, brought pressure to bear on the industry and one result was BMH's merger with Leyland to form British Leyland.

==== Pressed Steel ====
In 1965 BMC had purchased Pressed Steel, Britain's major car body manufacturer, and in the third quarter of 1966 it purchased Jaguar Cars. Three months later, to recognise the changed nature of their business, the company name was changed to British Motor (Holdings) Limited on 14 December 1966.

==== Jaguar ====
From the perspective of Jaguar, the sale to BMC which became firm in September 1966 (when BMC took control of Jaguar) came about for two principal reasons; First, Sir William Lyons, the managing director and co-founder of the company, saw the merger as the best way for Jaguar to ensure supplies of bodies from Pressed Steel, which supplied the company and was now owned by BMC. Second, Lyons, by now 65 and without his son John, who had been killed driving to Le Mans in 1955, did not have a long term succession plan. From the perspective of the BMC, a takeover of Jaguar was attractive because it was successful in the US market, and was thereby profitable at a time when BMC lacked the funds to invest sufficiently in modern production facilities or new models.

At the annual statement to shareholders for 1967, BMH chairman Sir George Harriman reported on Group Overseas Operations that the company had delivered to world markets (i.e. exported) 313,790 cars, commercial vehicles and tractors, including 72,049 manufactured overseas.

==== The marques ====
British Motor Holdings inherited a large number of British automotive marques but by now they were the badge-engineered unified range of one manufacturer incorporating three sports cars, MGB, MG Midget / Austin-Healey Sprite, Austin Healey 3000 plus Jaguar saloons and sports car and its badge-engineered Daimlers, Coventry Climax industrial engines and Guy trucks.

==== Estimated production of cars and commercial vehicles in the UK (1965) ====
Brand	Quantity		Share
BMC	890,000		40.2%
Jaguar	30,000		1.4%
BMH		920,000	41.5%
Standard-Triumph	125,000		5.6%
Rover	25,000		1.1%
Leyland		150,000	6.8%
Ford		590,000	26.6%
Vauxhall		333,000	15.0%
Rootes		220,000	9.9%
Rolls-Royce		1,200	0.1%
Total		2,214,200	100.0%

In 1965, the year prior to the merger, BMC and Leyland's annual production had reached one million vehicles per annum. By contrast, Jaguar's total production in 1966 was 15,690 vehicles.

=== Merger with Leyland ===
On 17 January 1968 BMH merged with the smaller prosperous Leyland Motors to form the British Leyland Motor Corporation (BLMC) on a one-for-one share exchange, valuing BMH at £201 million. BMH had reported a £3.4 million loss for 1966/7.
