= George Turnbull (businessman) =

Sir George Henry Turnbull, CEng, FIMechE (17 October 1926 – 22 December 1992) was a UK automobile executive best remembered in the UK for his period as managing director of the Austin-Morris Division of British Leyland.

== Early life ==
The son of a works manager at the Coventry-based Standard Motor Company, George Turnbull left his grammar school at the age of just 14 to take up a six-year automobile engineering design apprenticeship with Standard. It was the company that sponsored his engineering course at Birmingham University from which he obtained his first degree. He married in 1950 and fathered three children.

== Career ==
Between 1950 and 1951 he held a post as personal assistant to the Technical Director of the Standard Motor Company. Between 1955 and 1956 he was employed as works manager with oil engine manufacturers Petters before returning to Standard, where he achieved a series of promotions, initially within Standard, where he became General Manager from 1959 to 1962. and subsequently working for successor companies (much of the Midlands-based UK motor industry consolidated itself into what became the British Leyland Motor Corporation, late in 1968).

On his promotion to the board of the newly formed British Leyland in 1968 he was, at 41, the youngest member of the board. His time as managing director of the Austin-Morris division ran from 1968 to 1973 and is remembered as a period during which the company reaped the harvest from a decade of insufficient investment in product development and production technology, crowned by increasingly troubled industrial relations. Product launches during Turnbull's time included the Morris Marina. He resigned five months after his competitor (John Barber) to replace Donald Stokes as head of BL was appointed deputy chairman.

In 1974, Hyundai Motor Company were interested in developing their own car and they hired George Turnbull. He in turn hired five other top British car engineers, Kenneth Barnett body design, engineers John Simpson and Edward Chapman, John Crosthwaite ex-BRM as chassis engineer and Peter Slater as chief development engineer. Turnbull took two Marinas, one saloon and one coupé. They used the Marinas as a base to develop the Hyundai Pony. In 1975, the Pony, the first Korean car, was released, with styling by Giorgio Giugiaro of ItalDesign. It was sold in three door hatchback, four door fastback saloon, five door estate and pick-up variants, kick-starting the company's ascendancy in car manufacturing. Turnbull was soon appointed vice-president and director of the Hyundai Motor Company.

Turnbull's three-year contract with Hyundai expired towards the end of 1977 triggering speculation of a possible return to a position of power and responsibility with the by now nationalised and ever more troubled British Leyland business or with the British National Enterprise Board, a quango positioned between British Leyland and the British government. It was announced in September 1977 that Turnbull would be joining Iran National, then assembling passenger cars based on the British Hillman Hunter. Turnbull's mandate was to increase domestic sourcing of components and in the longer term to foster the development of a home-based auto-industry in Iran.

In 1979 he returned to the British motor industry as chairman of Talbot UK, formerly the Rootes Group and latterly Chrysler UK, by then a subsidiary of Peugeot. He had the task in 1981 of shutting the company's Linwood, Renfrewshire, plant where the Hillman Imp had been made. Remaining with Peugeot until 1984, he served as president of the Society of Motor Manufacturers and Traders from 1982 to 1984, when he joined the Inchcape investment company becoming chairman and chief executive in 1986 and retiring in 1991. One of the companies in the Inchcape group was the UK importer of Toyota cars and Turnbull played a significant part in persuading the Japanese manufacturer to build a factory in the UK.

He was knighted in 1990.

== Family ==
His brother, John Bartholomew Joseph Turnbull, was also an automobile design engineer.
