= British Motor Corporation =

Automobile manufacturer

The British Motor Corporation Limited
- Industry: Motor vehicles
- Predecessor: Morris; Austin
- Founded: April 1952
- Founders: Leonard Lord; William Richard Morris
- Defunct: 14 December 1966
- Fate: Merged with Jaguar to form British Motor Holdings
- Successor: British Motor Holdings
- Headquarters: Longbridge, England
- Key people: Leonard Lord; George Harriman
- Products: (include) Morris Minor, Mini, 1100, MGB, Austin-Healey

The British Motor Corporation Limited (BMC) was a vehicle manufacturer in England formed in early 1952 to give effect to an agreed merger of the Morris and Austin businesses.

BMC acquired the shares in Morris Motors and the Austin Motor Company. Morris Motors, the holding company of the productive businesses of the Nuffield Organization, owned MG, Riley, and Wolseley.

The agreed exchange of Morris or Austin shares for shares in the new holding company, BMC, became effective in mid-April 1952.

In September 1965, BMC took control of its major body supplier, Pressed Steel, acquiring Jaguar's body supplier in the process. In September 1966, BMC merged with Jaguar Cars. In December 1966, BMC changed its name to British Motor Holdings (BMH).

In May 1968 BMH merged with Leyland Motors, which made trucks and buses and owned both Standard-Triumph International and the Rover Company to become British Leyland, at which point the bulk of the operations of BMC were folded into the Austin-Morris division of British Leyland.

== Organisation ==
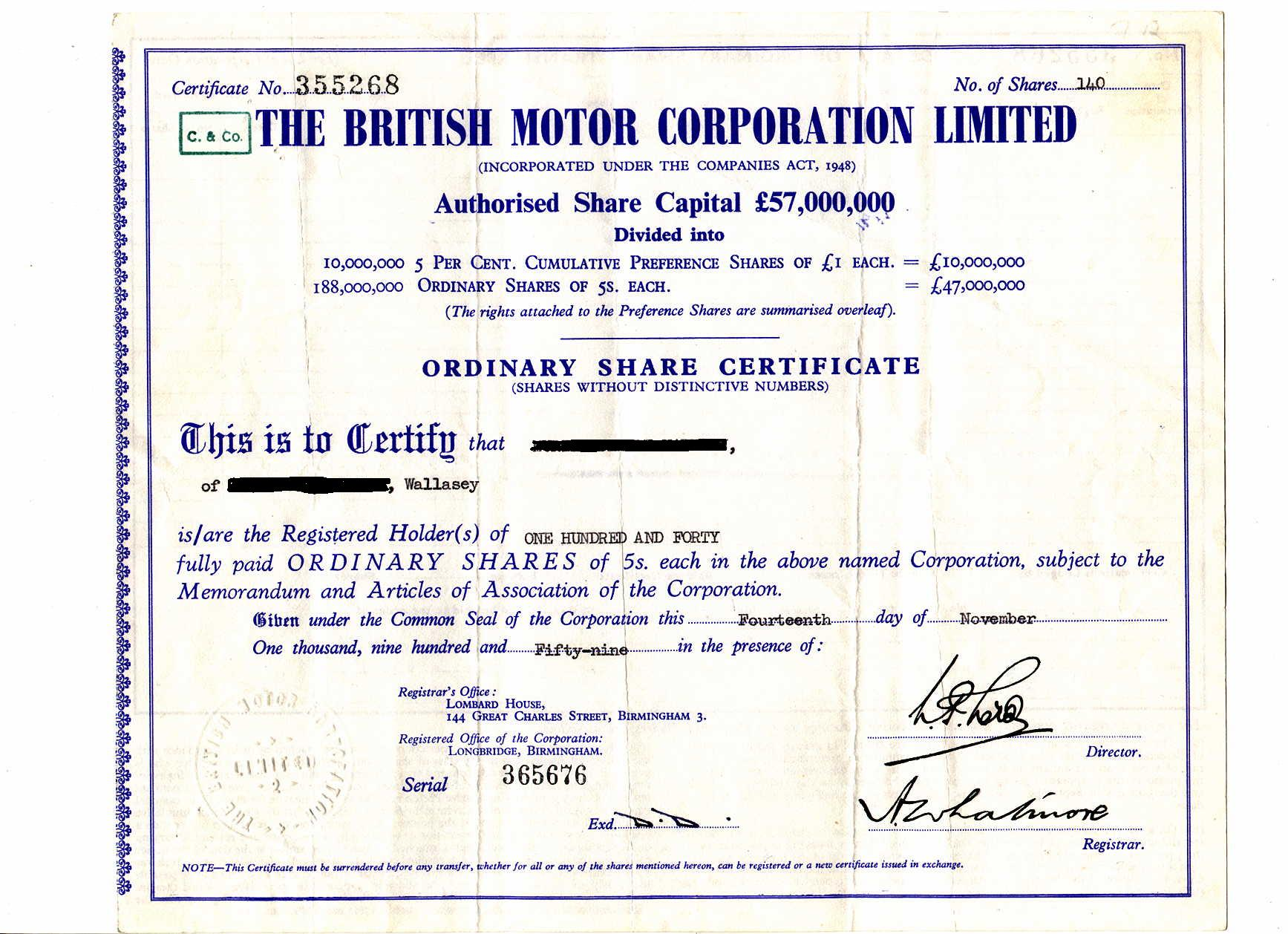
A BMC share certificate

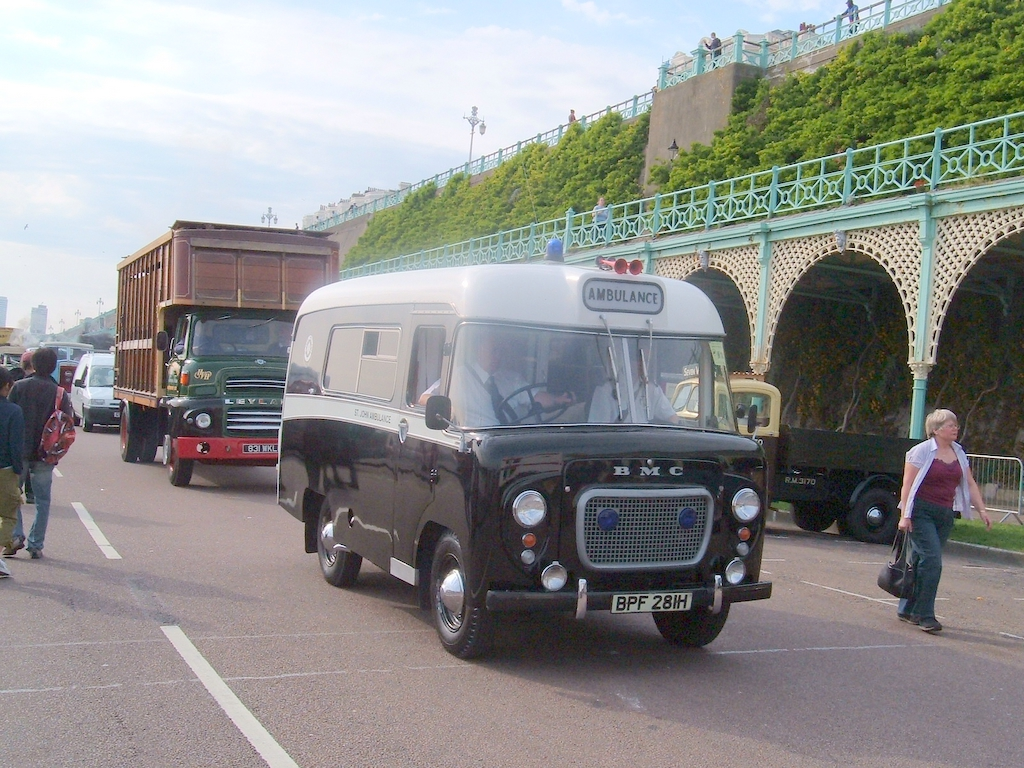
A BMC ambulance

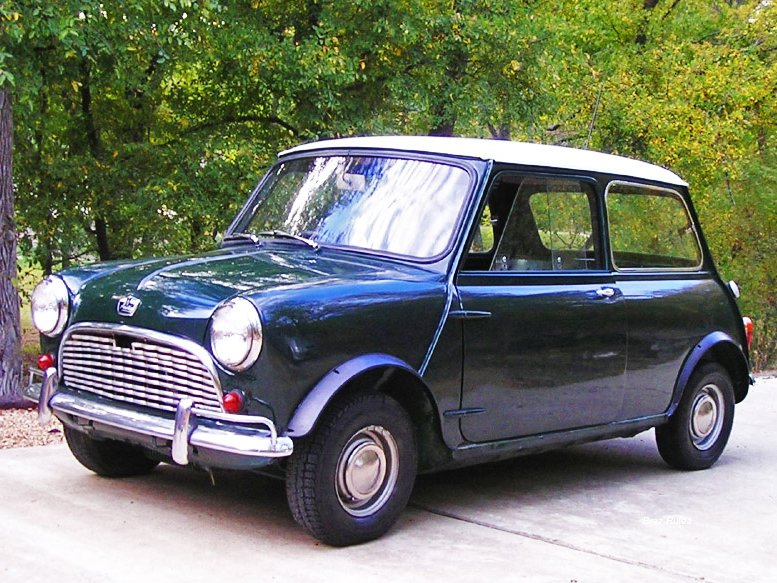
A 1963 Austin Mini Super-Deluxe. The Mini was BMC's all-time best seller.

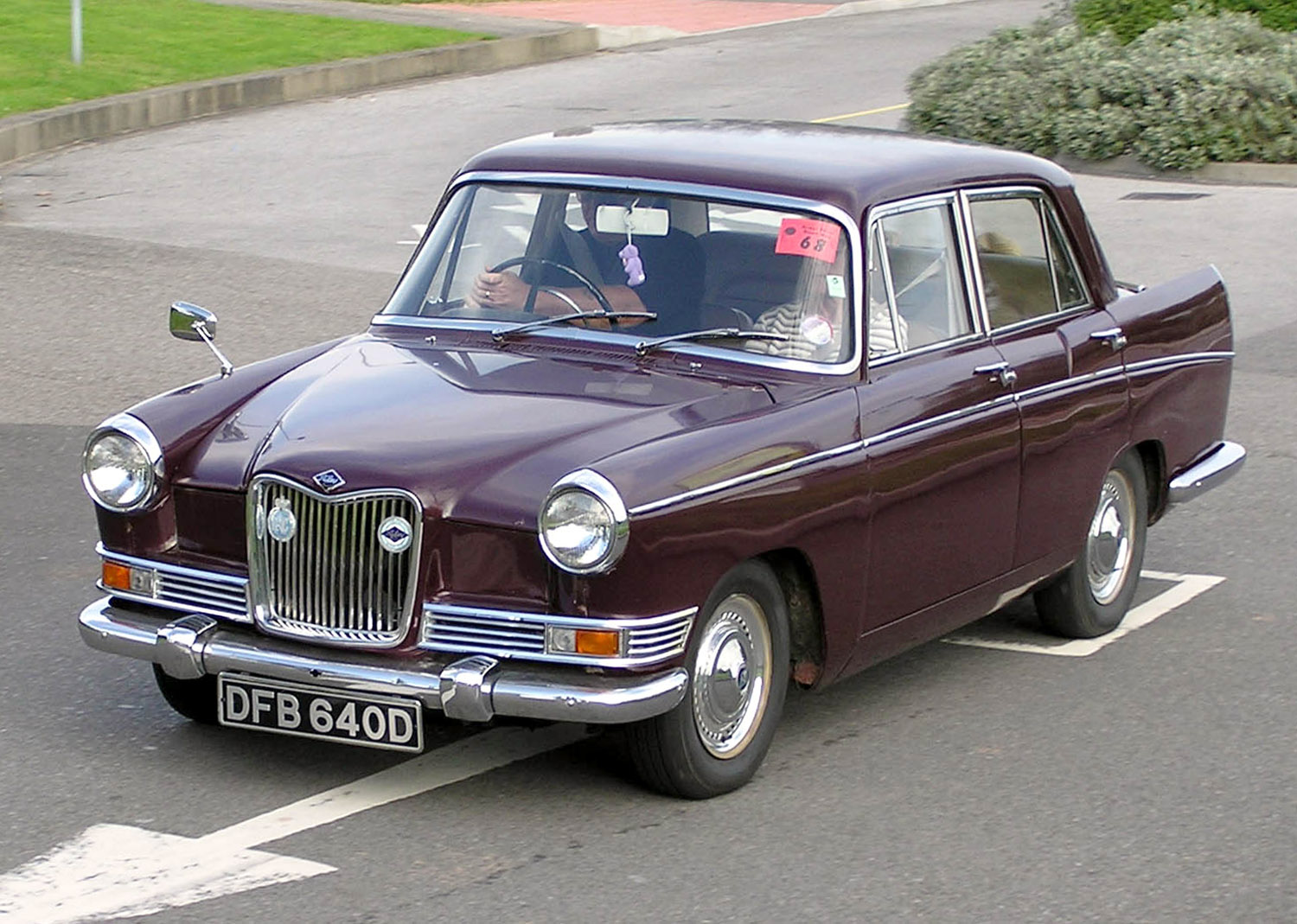
A 1965 Riley 4/72

BMC was the largest British car company of its day, with (in 1952) 39% of British output, producing a wide range of cars under brand names including Austin, Morris, MG, Austin-Healey, Riley, and Wolseley, as well as commercial vehicles and agricultural tractors. The first chairman was Lord Nuffield (William Morris), but he was replaced at the end of 1952 by Austin's Leonard Lord, who continued in that role until his 65th birthday in 1961, but handing over, in theory at least, the managing director responsibilities to his deputy George Harriman in 1956.

BMC's headquarters were at the Austin Longbridge plant, near Birmingham and Austin was the dominant partner in the group mainly because of the chairman. The use of Morris engine designs was dropped within three years and all new car designs were coded ADO from Austin Drawing Office. The Longbridge plant was up to date, having been thoroughly modernised in 1951, and compared very favourably to Nuffield's 16 different and often old-fashioned factories scattered over the Midlands. Austin's management systems, however, especially cost control and marketing, were not as good as Nuffield's and as the market changed from a shortage of cars to competition, this was to tell. The biggest-selling car, the Mini, was famously analysed by Ford, which concluded that BMC must have been losing £30 on every one sold. The result was that although volumes held up well throughout the BMC era, market share fell as did profitability and hence investment in new models, triggering the 1966 merger with Jaguar Cars to form British Motor Holdings (BMH), and the government-sponsored merger of BMH with Leyland Motors in 1968.

At the time of the mergers, a well established dealership network was in place for each of the marques. Among the car-buying British public was a tendency of loyalty to a particular marque and marques appealed to different market segments. This meant that marques competed against each other in some areas, though some marques had a larger range than others. The Riley and Wolseley models were selling in very small numbers. Styling was also getting distinctly old-fashioned and this caused Leonard Lord, in an unusual move for him, to call upon the services of an external stylist.

As well as the car manufacturing arms, the company had its own printing and publishing firm, the Nuffield Press, inherited from the Morris Motors group.

== BMC Farina ==
In 1958, BMC hired Battista Farina to redesign its entire car line. This resulted in the creation of three "Farina" saloons, each of which was badge-engineered to fit the various BMC car lines.

The compact Farina model debuted in 1958 with the Austin A40 Farina. This is considered by many to be the first mass-produced hatchback car: a small estate version was produced with a horizontally split tailgate, its size and configuration would today be considered that of a small hatchback. A Mark II A40 Farina appeared in 1961 and was produced through 1967. These small cars used the A-Series engine.

The mid-sized Farinas were launched in 1958 with the Wolseley 15/60. Other members of the group included the Riley 4/68, Austin A55 Cambridge Mk. II, MG Magnette Mk. III, and Morris Oxford V. Later, the design was licensed in Argentina and produced as the Siam Di Tella 1500, Traveller station wagon and Argenta pick-up. The mid-size cars used the B-Series straight-4 engine. Most of these cars lasted until 1961, though the Di Tellas remained until 1966. They were replaced with a new Farina body style and most were renamed. These were the Austin A60 Cambridge, MG Magnette Mk. IV, Morris Oxford VI, Riley 4/72, and Wolseley 16/60, and in 1964 the Siam Magnette 1622 alongside the Siam Di Tella in Argentina. Most remained in production until 1968, with no rear-wheel drive replacement produced.

The third and largest Farina car was the Austin A99 Westminster/Vanden Plas Princess 3-Litre/Wolseley 6/99, launched in 1959. They used the large C-Series straight-6 engine. The large Farinas were updated in 1961 as the Austin A110 Westminster, Vanden Plas Princess 3-Litre Mk. II, and Wolseley 6/110. These remained in production until 1968.

== BMC cars ==
=== Inherited models ===
==== Austin ====
- Austin A125 Sheerline (1947–1954)
- Austin A135 Princess (1947–1956)
- Austin A40 Sports (1950–1953)
- Austin A70 Hereford (1950–1954)
- Austin A30 (1951–1956)
- Austin A90 Atlantic (1949–1952)
- Austin A40 Devon (1947–1952)

==== MG ====
- MG TD (1949–1953)
- MG TF (1953–1955)
- MG Y-type (1947–1953)

==== Morris ====
- Morris Minor (1948–1971; until 1972 in New Zealand)
- Morris Oxford MO (1948–1954)
- Morris Six MS (1948–1953)

==== Riley ====
- Riley RM series (1945–1955)

==== Wolseley ====
- Wolseley 4/50 (1948–1953)
- Wolseley 6/80 (1948–1954)
- Nuffield Oxford Taxi (1947–1955)

=== BMC designs ===
==== Austin ====
- Austin A40 Somerset (1952–1954)
- Austin A40 Cambridge (1954–1956)
- Austin A90 Westminster (1954–1968)
- Austin Metropolitan (1954–1961)
- Austin A35 (1956–1959)
- Austin Lancer (1958–1962; Australia)
- Austin Princess IV (1956–1957)
- Austin A40 Farina (1958–1967)
- Austin A55 Cambridge (1957–1961)
- Austin A60 Cambridge (1961–1969)
- Austin Seven (Mini) (1959–1989)
- Austin Freeway (1962–1965; Australia)
- Austin 1100/1300 (1963–1974)
- Austin 1800 (1964–1975)
- Austin 3-Litre (1967–1971)
- Austin Maxi (1969–1981; designed in the BMC era)

==== Austin-Healey ====
- Austin-Healey 100 (1953–1959)
- Austin-Healey 3000 (1959–1968)
- Austin-Healey Sprite (1958–1971)

==== MG ====
- MG A (1955–1962)
- MG Magnette ZA/ZB (1953–1959)
- MG Magnette Mk III/Mk IV (1959–1968)
- MG Midget (1961–1974)
- MGB (1962–1980)
- MG 1100/1300 (1962–1973)
- MGC (1967–1969)

==== Morris ====
- Morris Oxford MO (1948–1954)
- Morris Oxford Series II (1954–1956)
- Morris Oxford Series III (1956–1959)
- Morris Oxford Farina (1959–1971)
- Morris Cowley (1954–1959)
- Morris Isis (1955–1958)
- Morris Marshal (1957–1960; Australia)
- Morris Major (1958–1964; Australia)
- Morris Mini Minor (Mini) (1959–2000)
- Morris 1100/1300 (1963–1974)
- Morris 1800 (1964–1975)

==== Princess ====
- Princess IV (1957–1959)
- Princess 3 litre (1959–1960)

==== Riley ====
- Riley Pathfinder (1953–1957)
- Riley 2.6 (1958–1959)
- Riley 1.5 (1957–1965)
- Riley 4/68 (1959–1961)
- Riley 4/72 (1961–1969)
- Riley Elf (1961–1969)
- Riley Kestrel (1965–1969)

==== Vanden Plas ====
- Vanden Plas Princess 3-Litre (1960–1964)
- Vanden Plas Princess 1100/1275/1300 (1963–1974)
- Vanden Plas Princess 4-Litre R (1964–1968)

==== Wolseley ====
- Wolseley 4/44 (1952–1956)
- Wolseley 6/90 (1954–1959)
- Wolseley 15/50 (1956–1958)
- Wolseley 1500 (1957–1965)
- Wolseley 15/60 (1958–1961)
- Wolseley 16/60 (1961–1971)
- Wolseley 6/99 (1959–1961)
- Wolseley 6/110 (1961–1968)
- Wolseley Hornet (1961–1969)
- Wolseley 24/80 (1962–1967; Australia)
- Wolsleley 1100/1300 (1965–1973)
- Wolseley 18/85 (1967–1972)

=== BMC project numbers ===
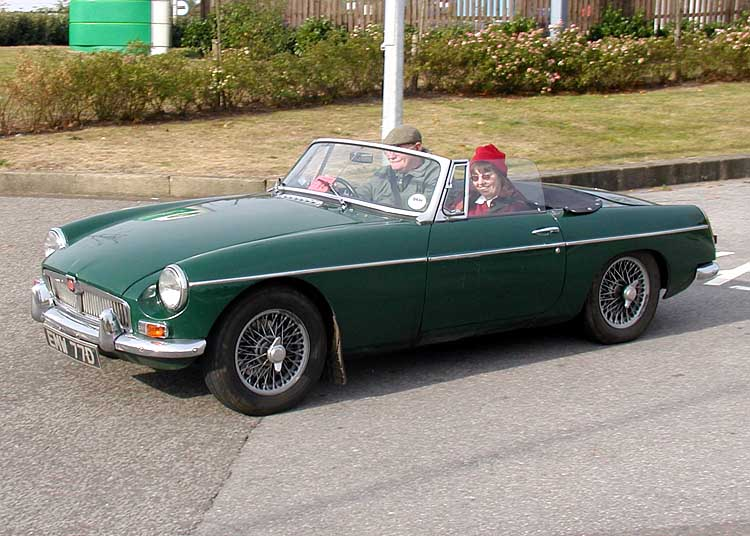
A 1966 MGB (ADO 23)

Most BMC projects followed the earlier Austin practice of describing vehicles with an ADO number, which stood for Austin Design Office but after the merger Amalgamated Drawing Office. Hence, cars that had more than one marque name (e.g. Morris Mini Minor and Austin Mini) would have the same ADO number. Given the often complex badge-engineering that BMC undertook, it is common amongst enthusiasts to use the ADO number when referring to vehicles which were a single design (for example, saying 'The ADO15 entered production in 1959'- this encompasses the fact that when launched, the ADO15 was marketed as the Morris Mini Minor and, later, the Austin Seven—soon replaced with Austin Mini). The ADO numbering system did continue for some time after the creation of British Leyland – notable models being the Austin Allegro (ADO67) and the prototype version of the Austin Metro (ADO88).

== Commercial vehicles ==
Most BMC-era commercial vehicles were sold as Morris, but there were sometimes Austin equivalents. Radiator badges on the larger vehicles were often BMC.

=== Car-based light vans ===
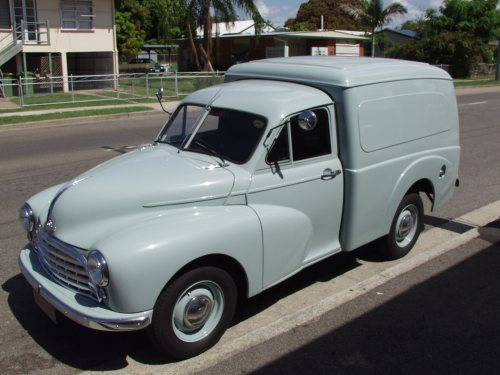
A Morris Cowley MCV Van

- Morris Z-series ¼-ton (Morris Eight Series E) 1940–53
- Morris ¼-ton O-Type (Morris Minor-based van) 1953–71
- Morris Cowley MCV van 1950–56
- Austin A30 van 1954–56
- Austin A35 van 1956–68
- Austin A35 pick-up 1956–57
- Morris ½-ton Series III van 1956–62
- Austin A55 van 1958–62
- Austin A55 pick-up (Australian built) 1958–62
- Mini van 1960–82
- Mini pick-up 1961–82
- Austin A40 Farina van (export only) 1961–67
- Austin 1800 Utility (Australia built) 1967–74

=== Light vans ===
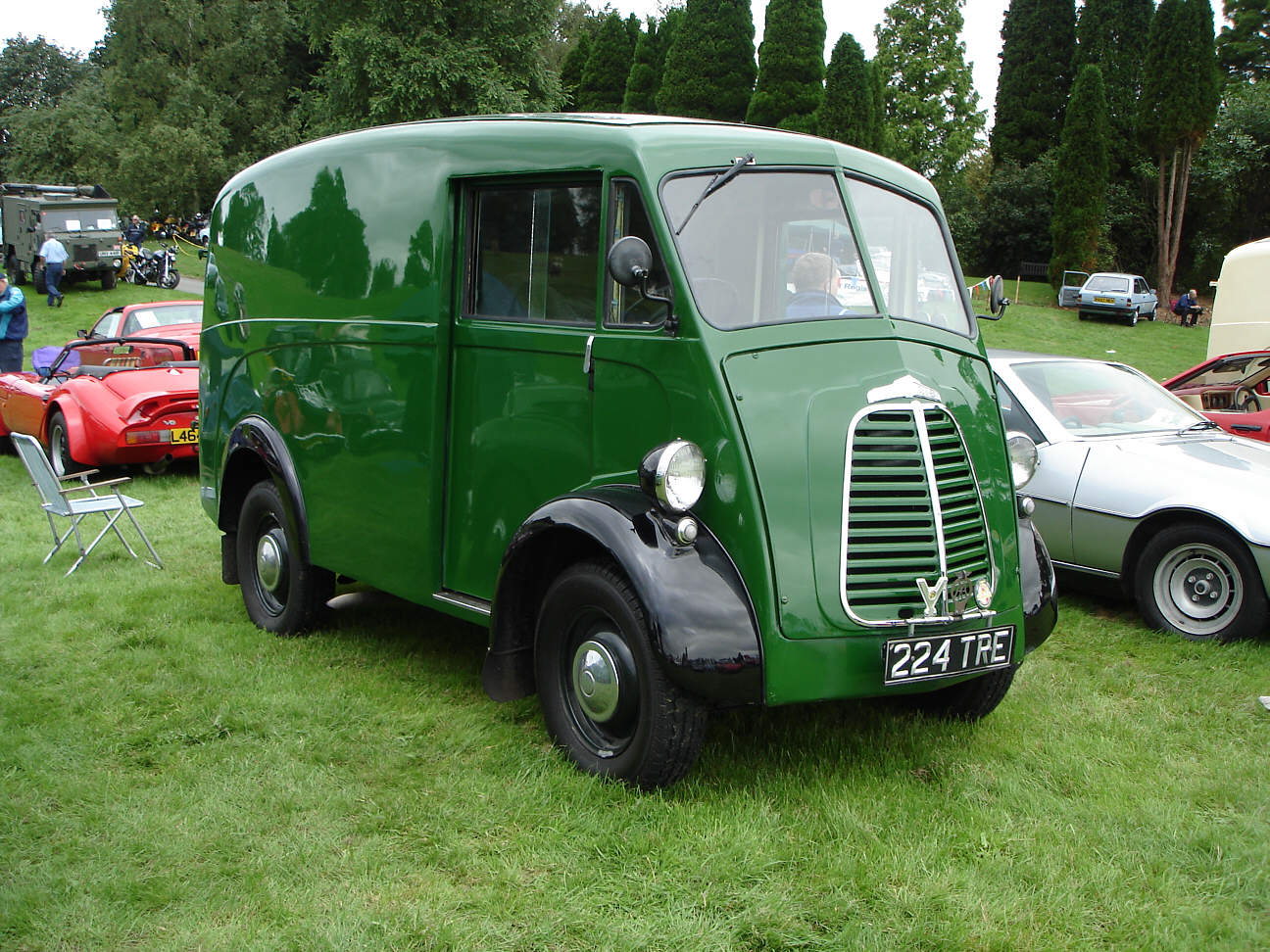
A 1957 Morris JB Van

- Austin K8 1948–1954
- Morris J-type 1949–1960
- Morris LD 1952–1968
- Morris J2 1956–1967
- Morris 250 JU 1967–
- Austin/Morris J4 1960–1974

=== Taxi cabs and hire cars ===
- Austin FX3 Taxi 1949–58
- Austin FL1 Hire Car 1949-58
- Austin FX4 Taxi 1958-82
- Austin FL2 Hire Car 1958-82

=== Light lorries ===
- Morris LC4 1952–54
- Morris LC5 1954–60
- Morris FV-series (Series I) 1948–54
- Morris FV-series (Series II) 1954–55
- Morris FE-series (Series III) 1955–59
- Morris FG 1960–68
- Morris FM 1961–68
- Morris WE 1955–64
- Morris WF 1964–81
- Morris FF 1958–61
- Morris FH 1961–64
- Morris FJ 1964–68
- BMC VA 1958–76

== BMC agricultural vehicles ==
With the merger of the Nuffield and Austin interests, the Nuffield Organization's tractor range, the Nuffield Universal, was incorporated into BMC.

== BMC abroad ==
In the 1950s and the 1960s, BMC set up 21 plants overseas, some as subsidiaries, and some as joint ventures, to assemble its vehicles. One was British Motor Corporation (Australia) which was established in 1953 at the Nuffield Australia site on the one-time Victoria Park Racecourse, Sydney. This facility went from a marshalling area for fully imported Morris cars (Austins were up until then being assembled in Melbourne from an earlier Austin Motors establishment), to a facility for making CKD cars, to the total local fabrication and construction of vehicles, engines, and mechanicals.

Denmark was a particularly strong market for BMC products in Europe. In the postwar period, the Danish government closely regulated exports and imports to maintain the country's balance of trade. High-value imports such as cars were heavily taxed.

From 1963 to 1975, a company was operated by Authi in Spain to produce BMC cars under licence. The factory was in Pamplona, Navarra, Spain, and when the production of Austin and Mini cars was discontinued, Sociedad Española de Automóviles de Turismo (SEAT), owned by the state and some banks and industrial investors, purchased the factory. After the takeover of SEAT by Volkswagen, SEAT made an 'internal' resale of the Pamplona factory, formerly Authi, to Volkswagen, which soon started producing there the 'Polo'.

In 1964, BMC Turkey was established in cooperation with the British Motor Corporation. The Turkish partners retained the 74% of the capital while 26% held by the UK-based British Motor Corporation.

== Government takes over ==
The Wilson Labour government (1964–1970) came to power at a time when British manufacturing industry was in decline and decided that the remedy was to promote more mergers, particularly in the motor industry. Chrysler was already buying into the Rootes Group, and Leyland Motors had acquired Standard Triumph in 1961 (and would buy Rover in 1967), becoming a major automotive force. BMC was suffering a dramatic drop in its share of the home market. Tony Benn, appointed Minister of Technology in July 1966, brought pressure to bear on the industry.

=== British Motor Holdings Limited ===
In mid-1965 BMC offered to buy its major supplier Pressed Steel and took control in September with 27,000 employees. Twelve months later, BMC merged with Jaguar Cars adding a further 7,000 employees. On 14 December 1966 BMC shareholders approved the change of its name to British Motor Holdings (BMH) and it took effect from that date.

=== British Leyland ===
Little more than 12 months later in January 1968, under pressure from the Labour government and Minister of Technology Tony Benn, a further wave of mergers occurred in the British car industry. BMH merged with Leyland Motors to form British Leyland.

Within the new conglomerate, the various marques were grouped together into two main divisions, based largely on the original BMC and LMC businesses; with the former mass market BMC marques becoming part of the Austin-Morris division of British Leyland, whilst LMC stablemates Rover and Triumph joined Jaguar in the Specialist Division.

This basic structure remained in place right up until the creation of the Austin Rover Group in the early 1980s, by which time British Leyland had been nationalised and renamed British Leyland (later just BL plc), although by this time both Jaguar and Land Rover had been placed in their own independent subsidiaries which were separate from the old BMC/LMC divisions.

== Post mortem ==
Following the merger with Leyland, a review of company records undertaken with the support of the new board, author Graham Turner stated that at the time of the merger, 16 versions of the Mini were being produced, yielding an average profit of just £16 per car, while every Morris Minor sold lost the group £9 and every Austin Westminster sold lost £17. This helps to explain why the Westminster and Minor were among the early casualties of the merger, as well as the introduction of the Mini Clubman, capable of being built for less, but sold for more than a standard Mini thanks to simplified ("modernised") front panels.

Even the UK's best seller, the Austin/Morris 1100, had to be subjected to an emergency cost-reduction programme which removed about £10 from the cost of each car, applying changes that included the omission of lead sealing from body joints (£2.40 per car), removing provision for optional reversing lamps (£0.10) and "changes in body finish" (£0.75).

Rebuilding the Cowley plant to include "new automated body building facilities" saved £2.00 in transport costs per car for bodies that no longer needed to be transported from the corporation's Swindon plant and in the longer term further transport costs were saved by concentrating assembly of the model at a single plant, rather than splitting it between plants at Cowley and Longbridge.

Because of the high proportion of auto-production costs represented by fixed costs that needed to be allocated over a planned production volume, and the use in the 1960s of investment appraisal criteria that were ill-suited to accounting for volume fluctuations and the rapidly changing value of the UK currency in the 1960s, the precise figures quoted may be open to challenge, but the new management's diagnosis that BMC's profitability was insufficient to fund support and new model investment to cover its disparate range of brands and models was hard to refute.

Throughout the 1960s, the failure of the United Kingdom to join the European Economic Community meant that the company could not exploit the lucrative European markets due to high import tariffs, whereas BMC's key rivals Ford and General Motors both had German subsidiaries producing and selling within the bloc, and were therefore immune from those import tariffs.

In 2002, BMC (Turkey), a Turkish commercial vehicle builder, originally set up by the British Motor Corporation to build its designs under licence in the 1950s, began exporting its vehicles to Britain. This allowed the return of the BMC brand to British roads for the first time in over 40 years.

== See also ==
- BMC engines
- Bathgate Lorry Plant
