= Riley Kestrel =

British car model

Riley 'Kestrel' was a brand name applied by the Riley Motor Car Company and its successors the Nuffield Organization and the British Leyland Motor Corporation to various of their saloon car models.

In pre-war Rileys, the Kestrel name typically denoted a sporty model with 'fastback' styling. Some of the cars produced in each of the following models received the Kestrel name, which was then revived in 1965 for a badge engineered version of the BMC ADO16:

- 1926–1937 — Riley Nine
- 1934–1935 — Riley 12/4
- 1935–1938 — Riley 1½ Litre
- 1937–1940 — Riley 16 (16/4) 2½-litre
- 1965–1969 — A variant of the BMC ADO16/Austin/Morris 1100/1300)

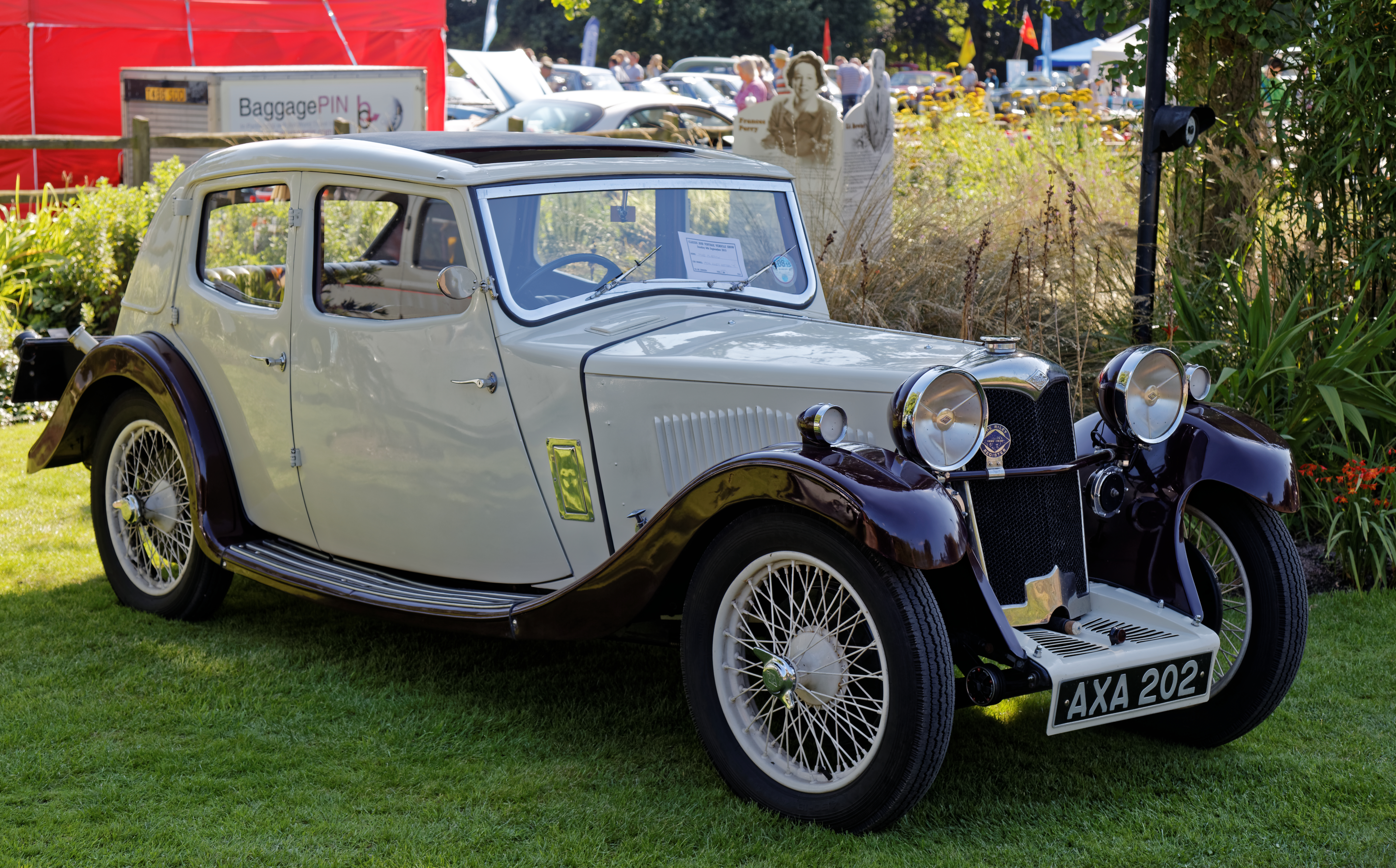
Riley Nine Kestrel (1934 pictured)

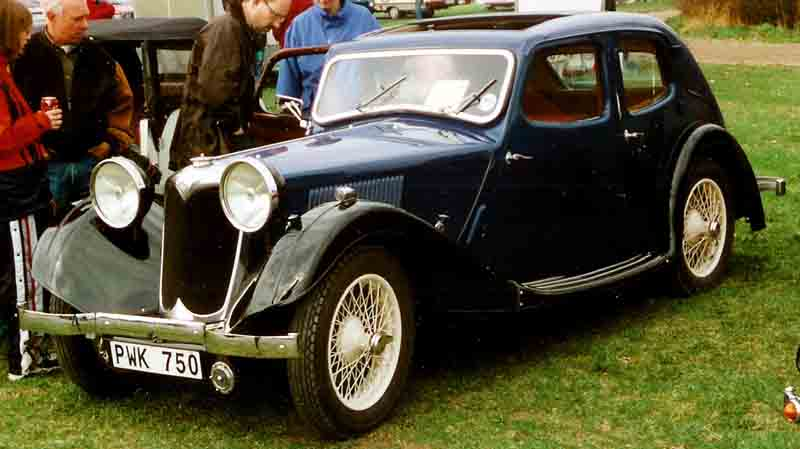
Riley 12/4 Kestrel (1935 pictured)

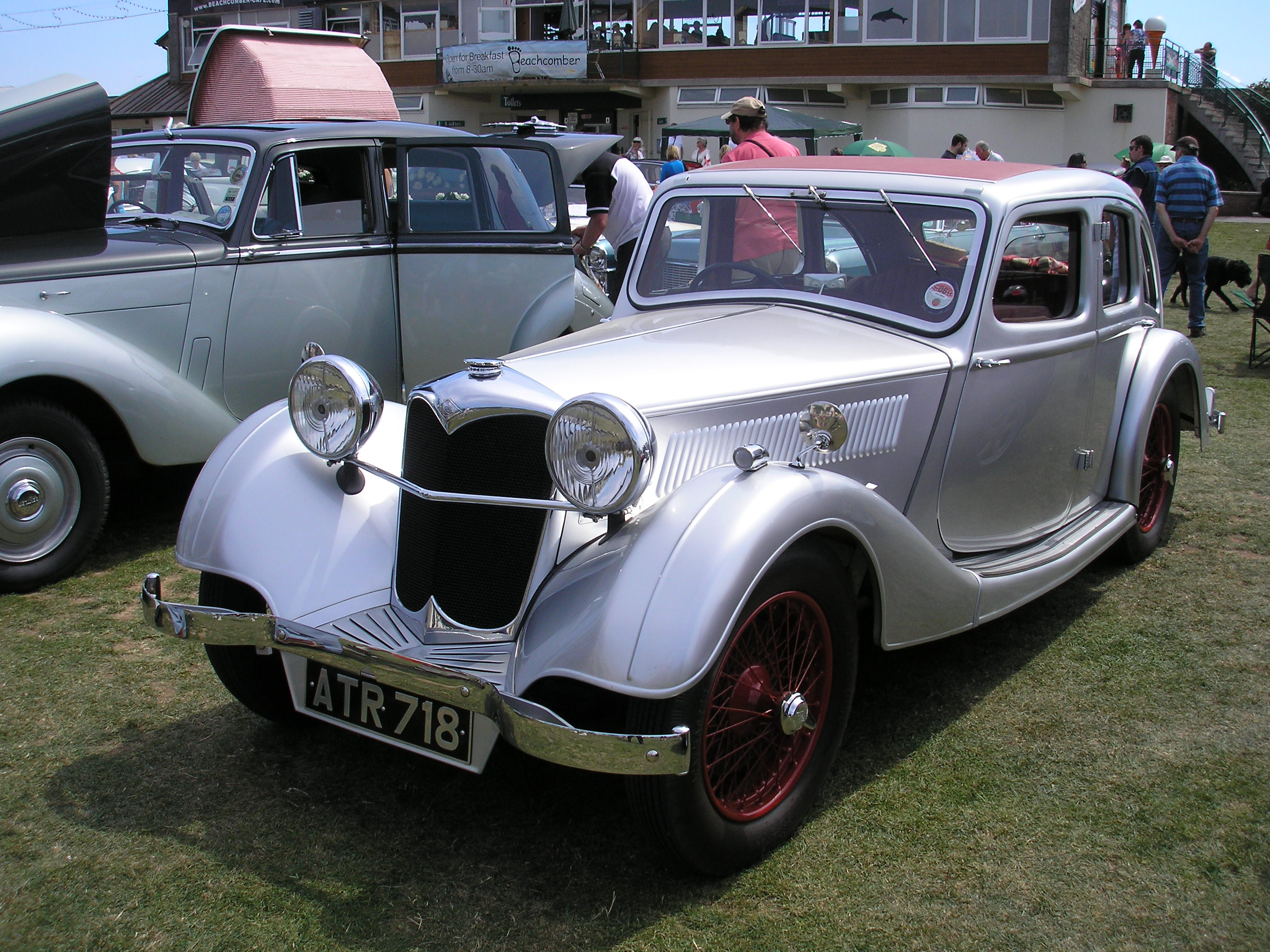
Riley 1½ Litre (1937 pictured)

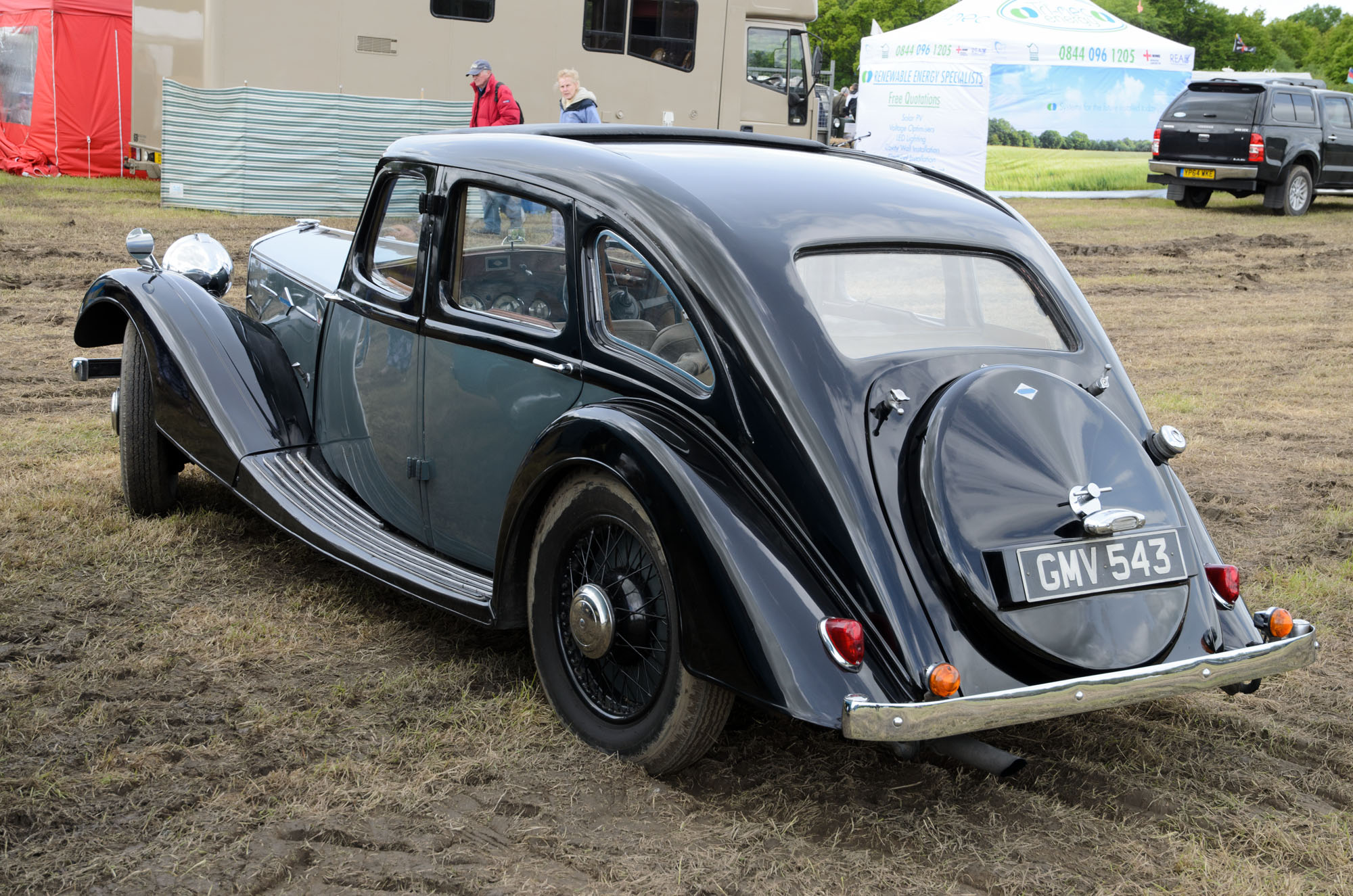
Riley 16/4 "Big Four" (1938 pictured)

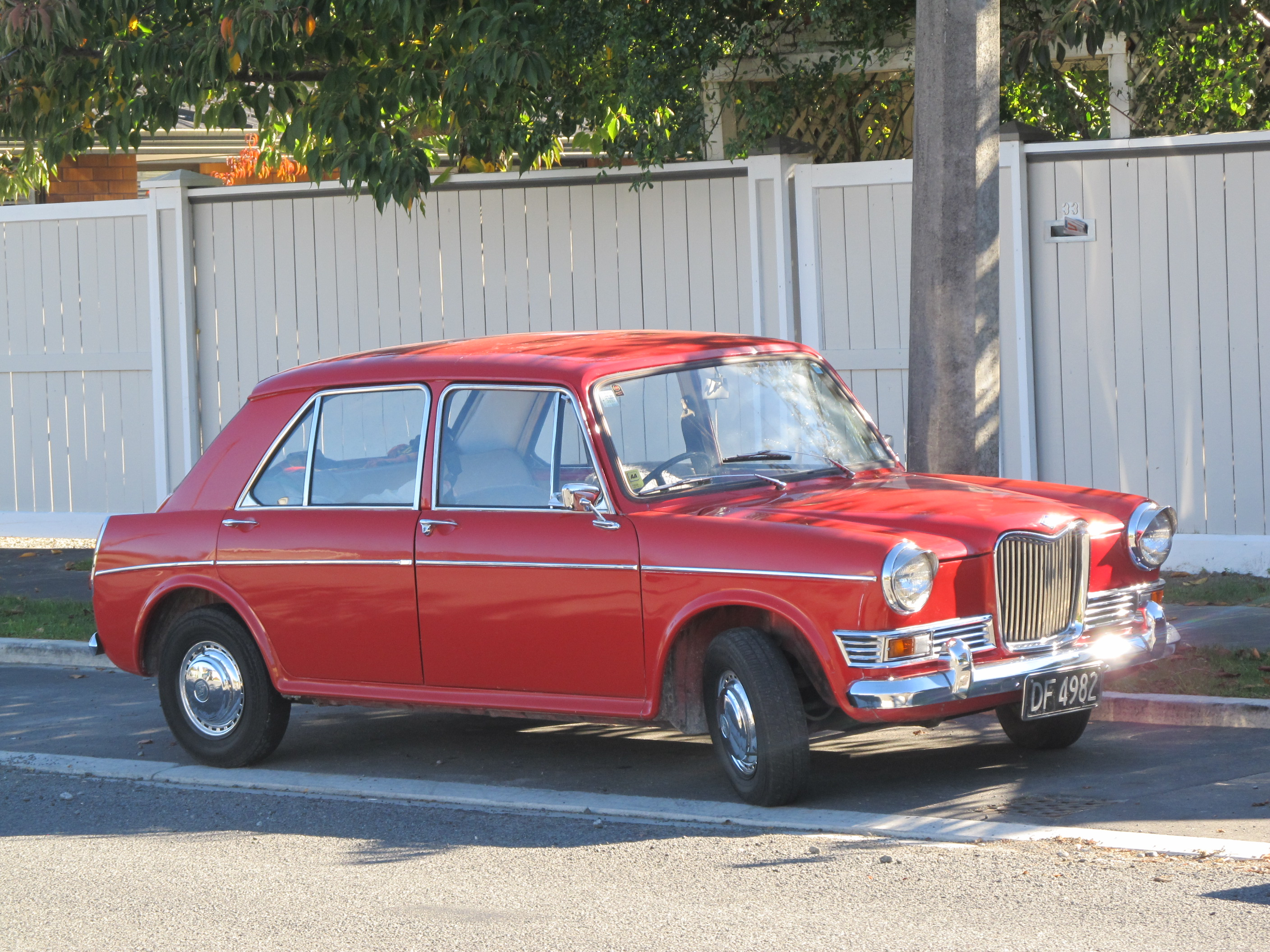
Riley Kestrel (1967 pictured)
