= George Harriman =

British businessman

Sir George Harriman
- Born: George William Harriman; 3 March 1908; Coventry, England
- Died: 29 May 1973 (aged 65)
- Occupation(s): Rugby football player Auto-industry chief (BMC)
- Spouse: Ida Horlick
- Children: 1

Sir George William Harriman CBE (3 March 1908 – 29 May 1973) was a leading figure in the British motor industry in the 1960s.

== Early life and education ==
Harriman was born in Coventry to George Harriman, a "Motor Machinist", and May Victoria (née Cooper).

== Career ==
=== Morris Motors ===
In 1923 he was apprenticed at the Hotchkiss works in Coventry of Morris Motors Limited. He was promoted repeatedly, becoming assistant works superintendent with Morris in 1938.

=== Austin Motor Company ===
In 1940 he joined Austin, and by 1945 had become a director of that company. There followed a succession of promotions through the management of BMC, a car manufacturing conglomerate created from the merger in 1952 of the Morris and Austin businesses.

=== British Motor Corporation ===
In 1961 he was appointed Chairman and Managing Director of the British Motor Corporation having taken over many of the responsibilities of Leonard Lord some years earlier.

== Personal life ==
In addition to his business career, he was a noted rugby football player, captaining the Coventry and Warwickshire teams in the 1930s, and playing briefly for the England team in 1933.

He married Vera G Reynolds in 1936, but she died in 1954 aged just 42. In 1957 his sister married his late wife's brother.

== Honours ==
Harriman was appointed Officer of the Order of the British Empire (OBE) in 1943 and Commander of the Order of the British Empire (CBE) in 1951.

He was knighted in 1965.
