= Rochdale (car) =

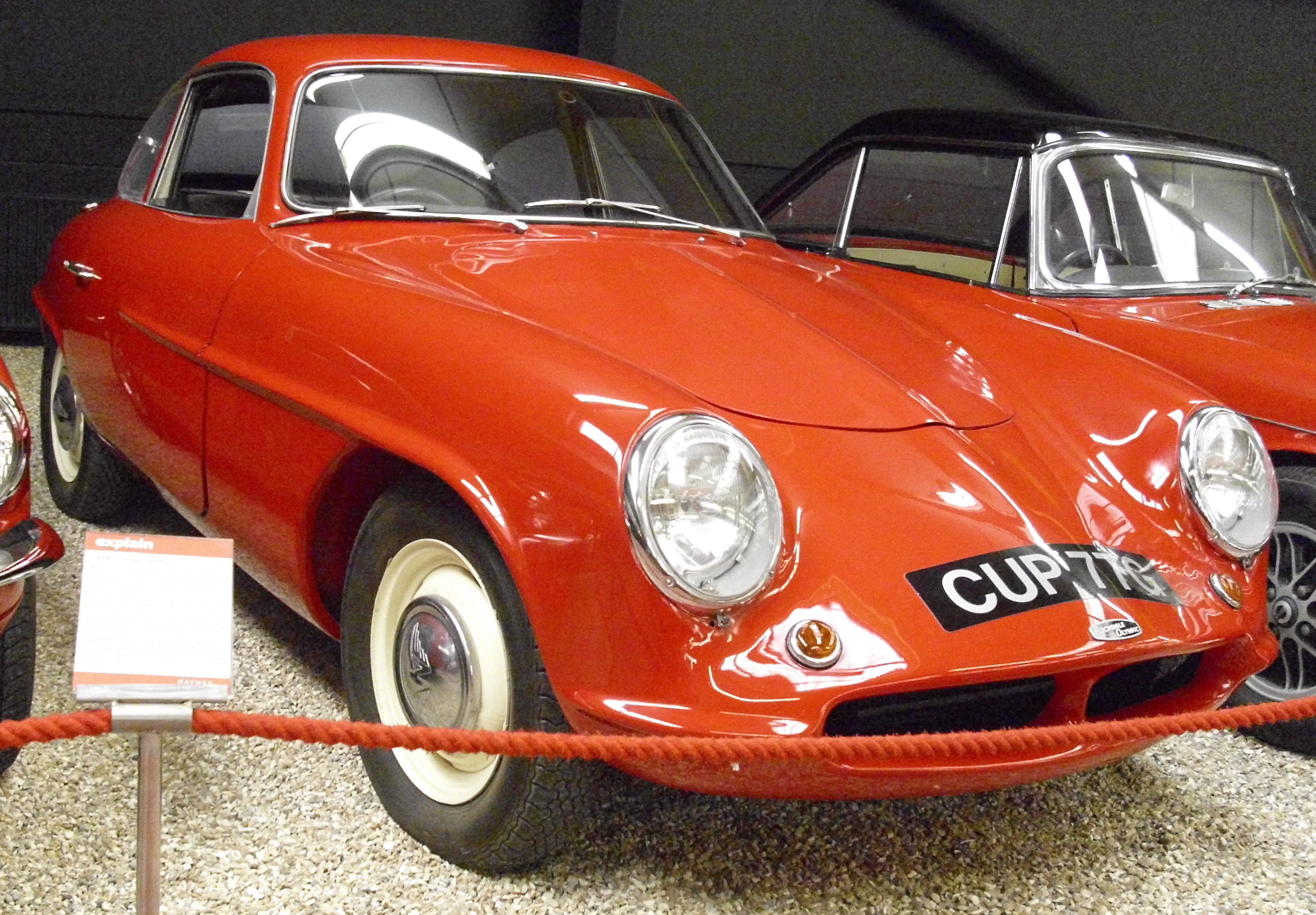
Rochdale Olympic

Rochdale cars were a series of mainly glass fibre bodied British sports cars made by Rochdale Motor Panels and Engineering in Rochdale, Greater Manchester, England between 1948 and 1973. The company is best remembered for the Olympic coupé made between 1959 and 1973.

== History ==
The Rochdale company was founded in 1948 by Frank Butterworth and Harry Smith in an old mill building in Hudson Street, Rochdale. They performed general motor repairs and made themselves some alloy bodies, usually single-seaters, for racing Austin 7s and other cars. They went on to sell the bodies as the Mk II.

=== Rochdale Mk IV ===
In 1954 Rochdale launched the Mark IV, using a glass fibre, two-door, two-seater body that was supplied as a bare shell. It was offered with several wheelbases, ranging from 81 inches, primarily intended for the Austin 7 chassis, up to 108 inches. In addition to a suitable chassis, the purchaser/builder had to provide all the interior fittings and the brackets to locate the mechanical components. The body cost £47 10 shillings (£47.50) and was available until 1961. About 150 were made.

=== Rochdale ST ===
1955 saw the introduction of the more complete ST kit, designed to fit the Ford 10 or Ford Popular chassis. Doors and bonnet were ready-fitted and all bulkheads were included. The open body was not rigid enough, so only a few cars were made before the kit was replaced in 1959 by the GT.

=== Rochdale GT ===
In 1957 the company introduced the Rochdale GT which superseded the earlier ST model and eventually become the best-selling Rochdale.

The GT was designed for the Ford Popular and was based on the Rochdale F type racing body, but a roof was added to increase the chassis's torsional stiffness (flex) compared to the open ST. The GT was well equipped and came ready-fitted with doors, bonnet, and curved windscreen. From 1960 the car was available with Rochdale's own chassis. About 1350 were made.

=== Rochdale Riviera ===
The 1959 Riviera was a convertible version of the GT, available in two- and four-seater versions, with an optional hardtop. It cost £140. About 50 had been made by the time a fire destroyed the company's premises in 1961, forcing relocation to Littledale Mill nearby on Littledale street.

=== Rochdale Olympic ===
Rochdale Olympic
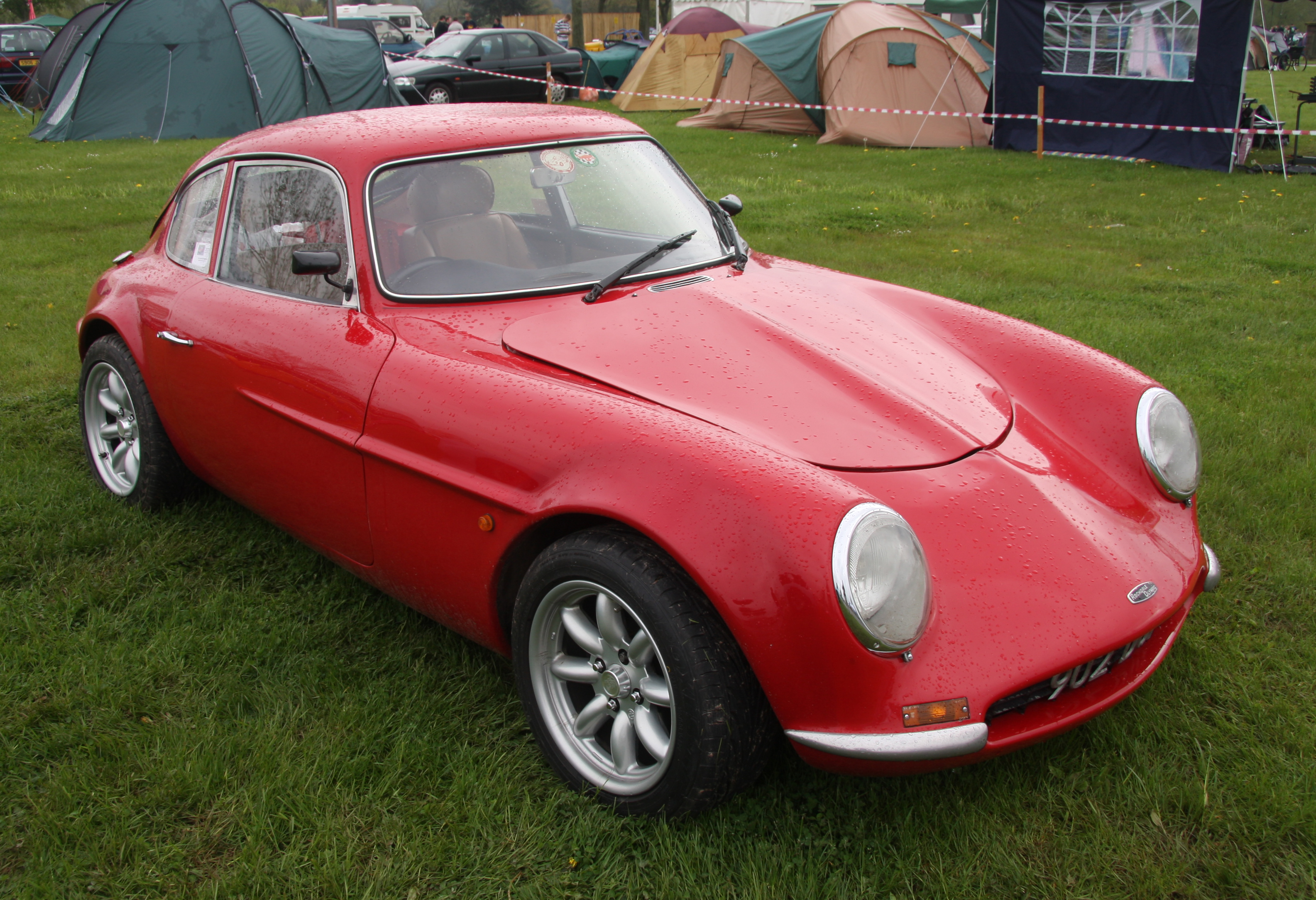

Overview
- Manufacturer: Rochdale Motor Panels and Engineering
- Production: 1959–1973 about 400 made
- Designer: Richard Parker

Body and chassis
- Class: Kit car

Powertrain
- Engine: Phase 1 : Riley, twin-carburettor, 1.5 litre; Morris Minor, MG MGA, Ford 109E; Phase 2 : Ford 116E 1,500 cc (92 cu in)
- Transmission: usually 4-speed manual

Dimensions
- Wheelbase: 86.5 in (2,197 mm)
- Length: 147 in (3,734 mm)
- Width: 64 in (1,626 mm)

Chronology
- Predecessor: Rochdale GT
- Successor: None

The breakthrough came in 1959 with the monocoque Olympic designed by Richard Parker and only the third glass fibre monocoque bodied car to enter production (after the Berkeley and Lotus Elite). This featured a closed coupé style bodyshell with the provision for 2+2 seating but the rear seats were very cramped and many builders left them out. Unlike many sports and low production cars of the time, wind down windows were installed.

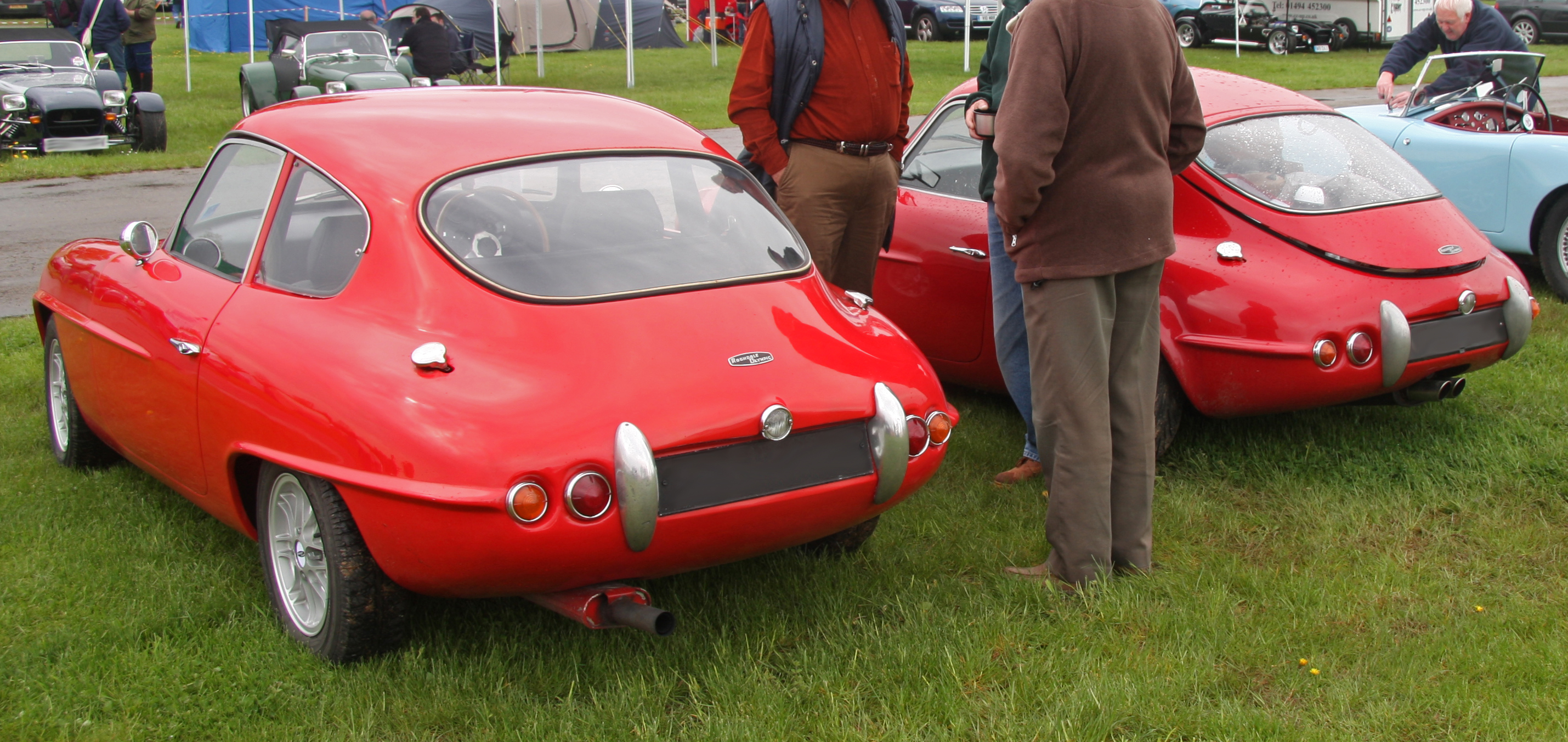
Comparison of Olympic Phase I and Phase II rear ends, Phase II with opening rear hatch

Production started in 1960 using a Riley, twin-carburettor version, of the 1.5 litre BMC B-series engine, independent front suspension by torsion bar modified from that of the Morris Minor and a live rear axle suspended by coil springs. Other engines could be fitted including the Morris Minor, MG MGA, and Ford 109E. The engine and front suspension were mounted on a tubular steel subframe bonded to the body shell and roll over protection was provided by a steel tube over the windscreen. The car appeared at the Copenhagen Racing Car Show and the Geneva Motor Show. A very complete kit, including an engine and all other mechanical parts, cost £670. About 250 were made when the fire caused production to be suspended. The car was available in both left and right hand drive and cars were exported to several countries including Australia and the United States. On a test by The Motor magazine in 1961 a 1.5 litre Riley engined model achieved a top speed of 102 mph (164 km/h) and a 0-60 mph (97 km/h) time of 11.9 seconds.

The Phase II Olympic was introduced in 1963 at the London Racing Car Show and was now standardised on a 78 bhp Ford 116E 1500 cc engine. The front suspension now uses Triumph wishbone units whilst the rear uses a BMC axle with coil springs. Front disc brakes were fitted. The car weighed under 12 cwt and could reach 114 mph (183 km/h) with a 0-60 mph time of under 11 seconds. The rear window was made to open to give better access to the interior. The car was available as a complete kit for around £735 or fully built for £930 and about 150 were made. Production declined rapidly after 1967 but the last body was made in 1973. They attempted to introduce the model in the US in 1970.

The body moulds are now owned by the Rochdale Owners Club.

== Production ==
Vehicle production between 1952 and 1973.

Years	Model	Production
1952-54	Mark II	6
1952-54	Alloy	10
1954-61	Mk IV	150
1955-61	C-Type	30
1955-61	F-Type	50
1955-59	ST	100
1957-60	GT	1350
1959-61	Riviera	50
1960-67	Olympic Phase I	250
1963-73	Olympic Phase II	150

== See also ==
- List of car manufacturers of the United Kingdom
