= Downtown West Allis Classic Car Show =

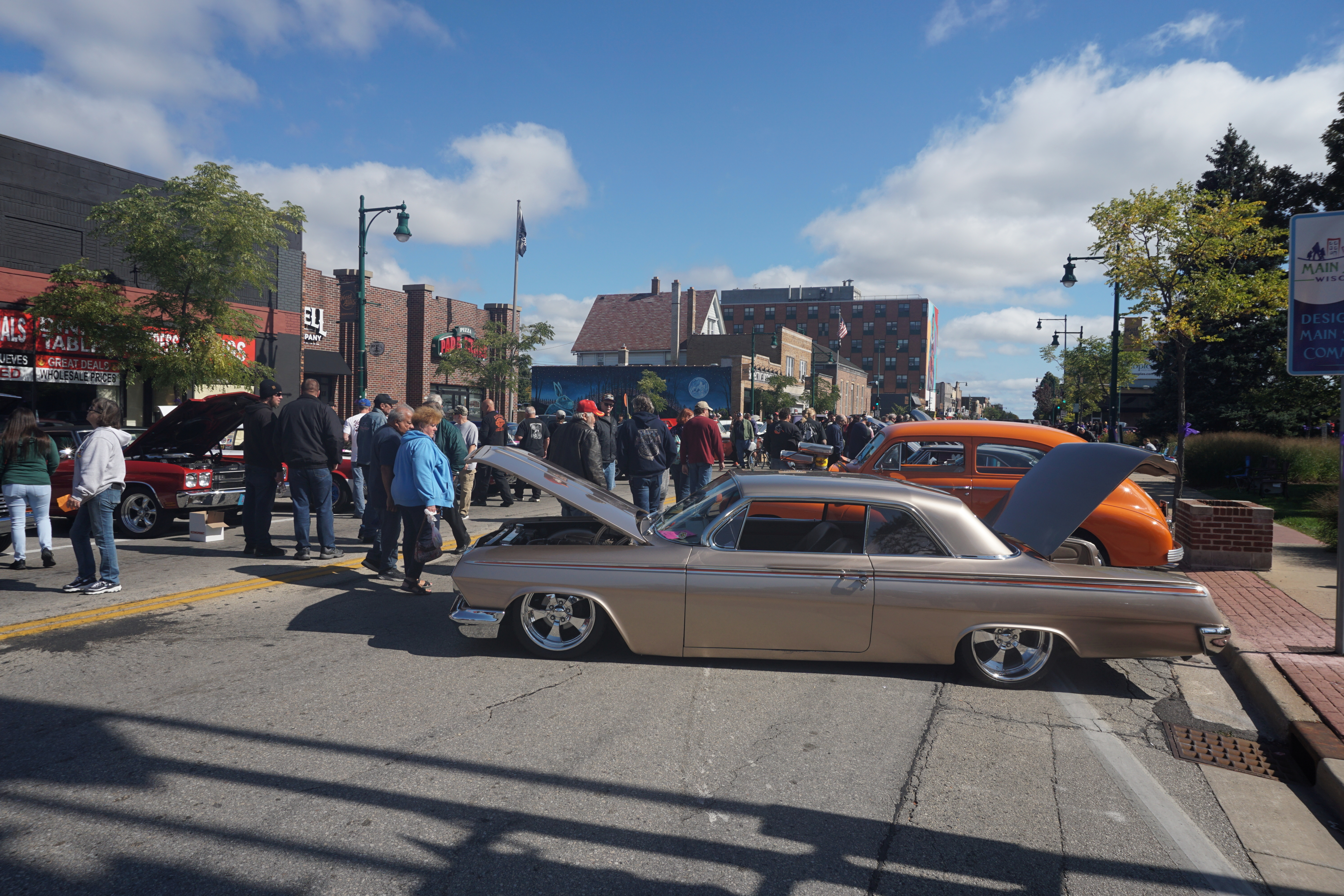
2022 Downtown West Allis Classic Car Show

The Downtown West Allis Classic Car Show is an annual classic car show held in West Allis, Wisconsin, a suburb of Milwaukee. The show is typically held in early October. It takes place on Greenfield Avenue in downtown West Allis between 70th and 76th streets, and also includes small portions of those cross streets. In addition to the cars on display, the show features activities for children (including Hot Wheels model car races), food vendors, live music, and raffles.

The 1998 edition of the Downtown West Allis Classic Car Show featured more than 200 cars. In 2007, the show won an honorable mention for "Best Creative Fund Raising Effort" at the Wisconsin Main Street Awards. The 2014 edition had over 425 cars participating. The 2020 show was cancelled due to the COVID-19 pandemic, with the next edition held in 2021. The 2022 show had more than 500 cars entered.

== Gallery ==
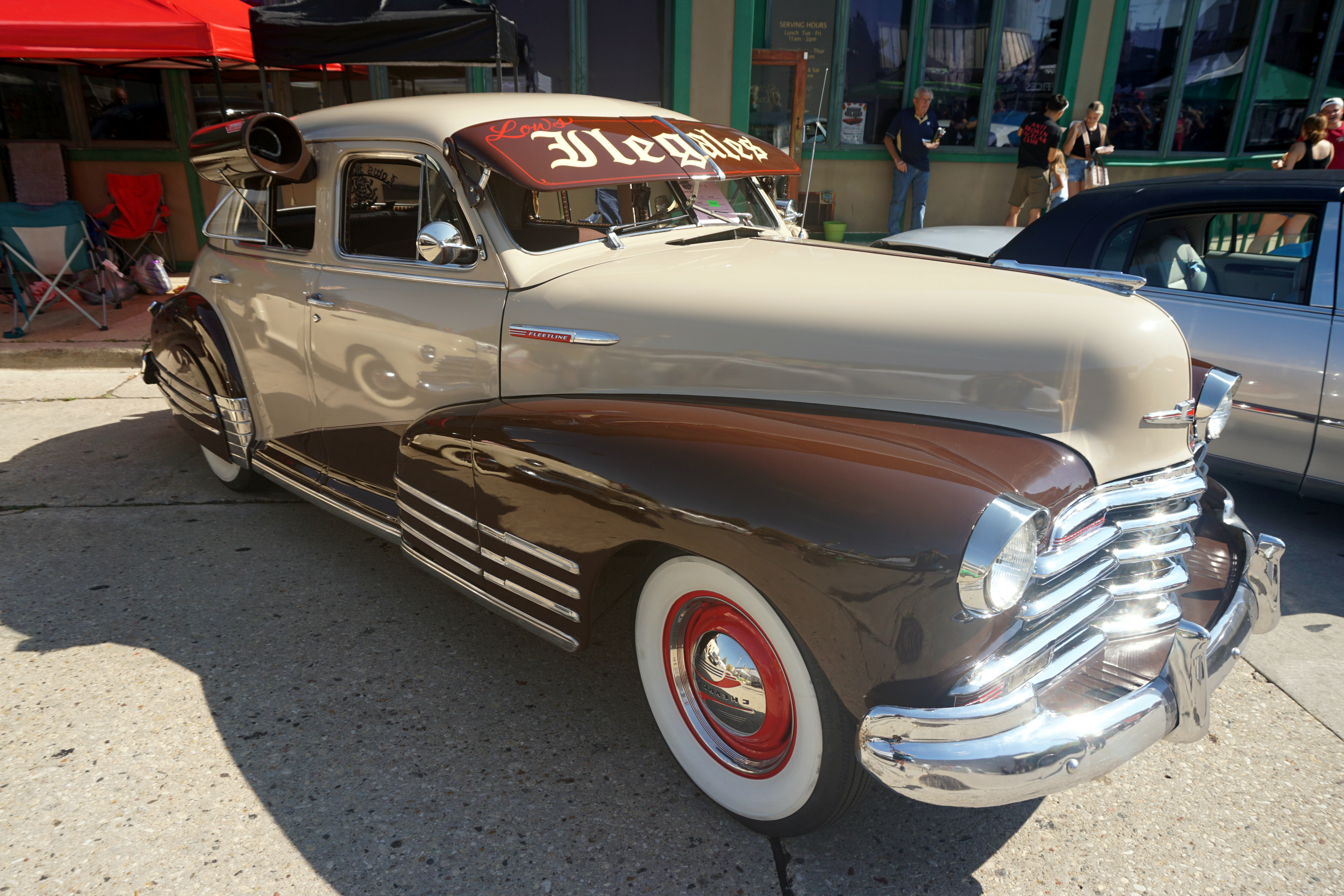
1947 Chevrolet Fleetline

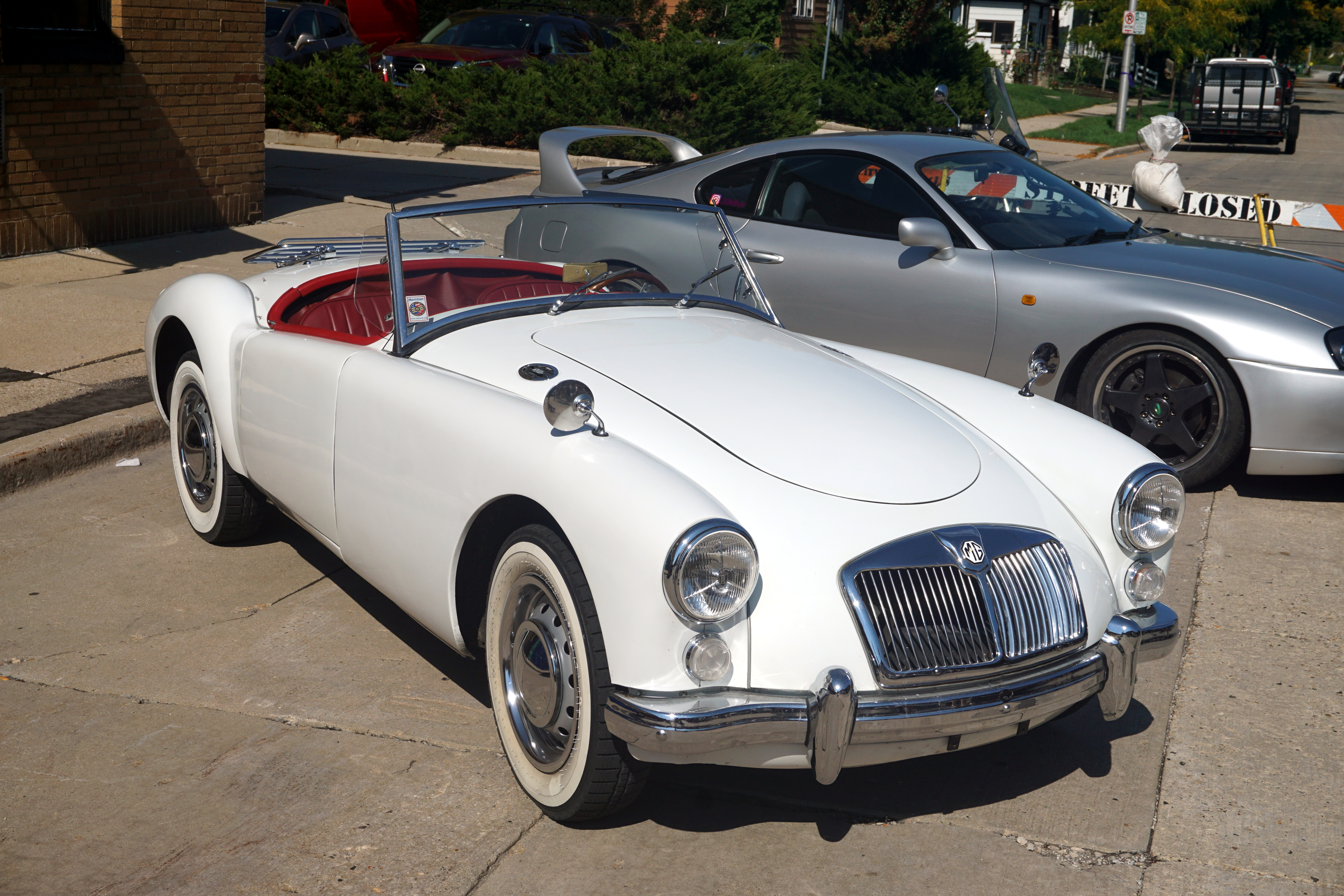
MG MGA

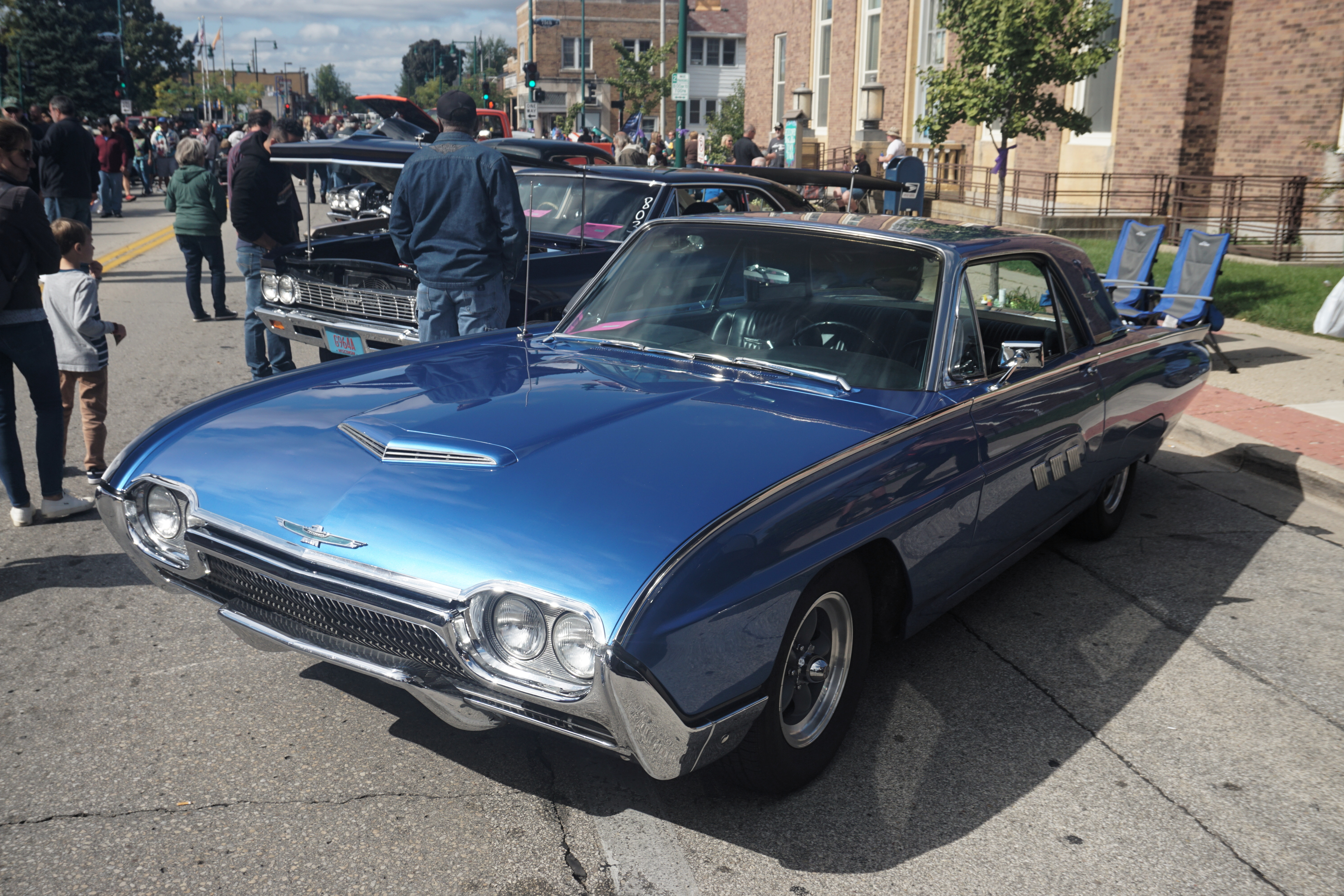
1963 Ford Thunderbird

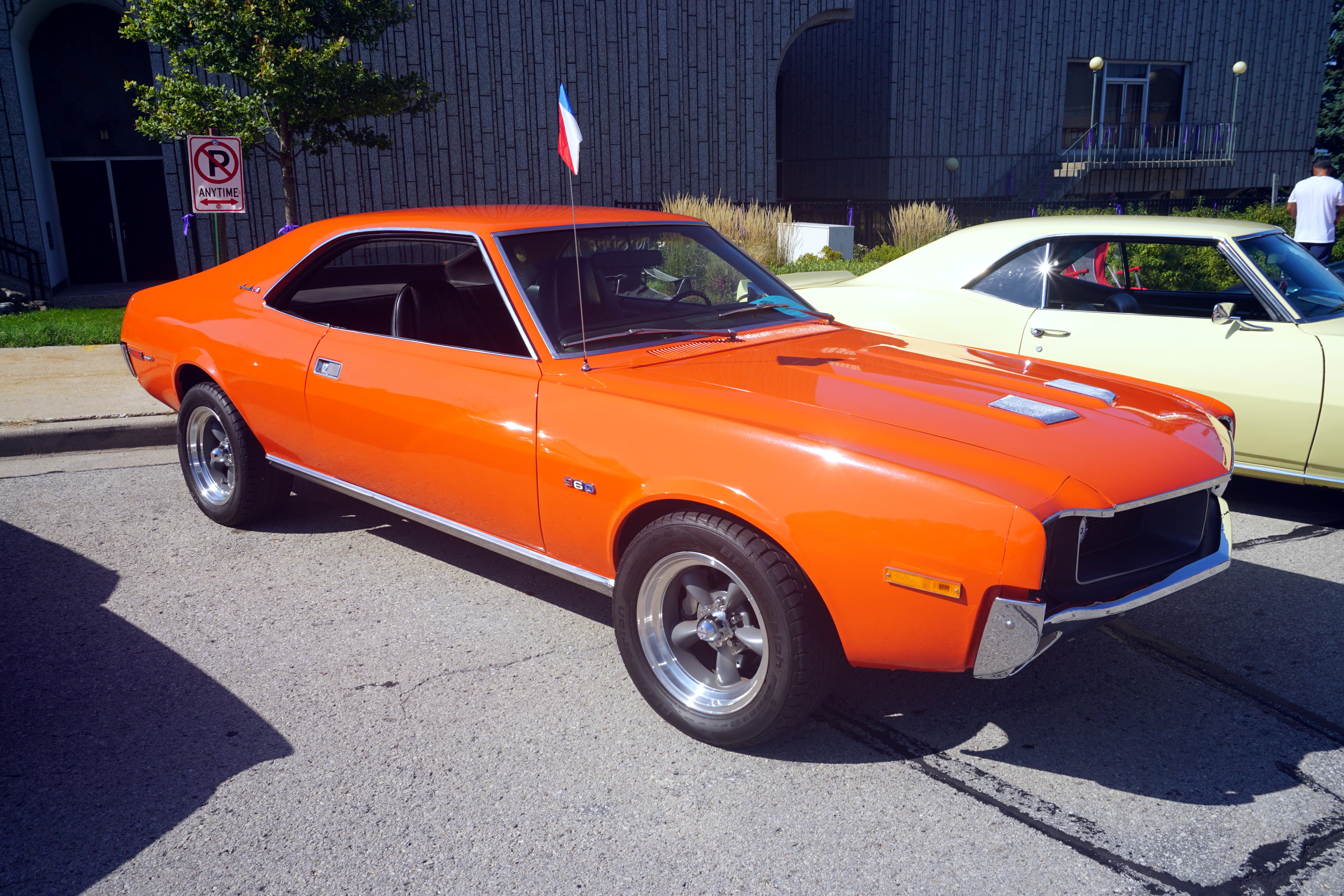
1970 AMC Javelin
