= Morris Commercial J4 =

Morris J4
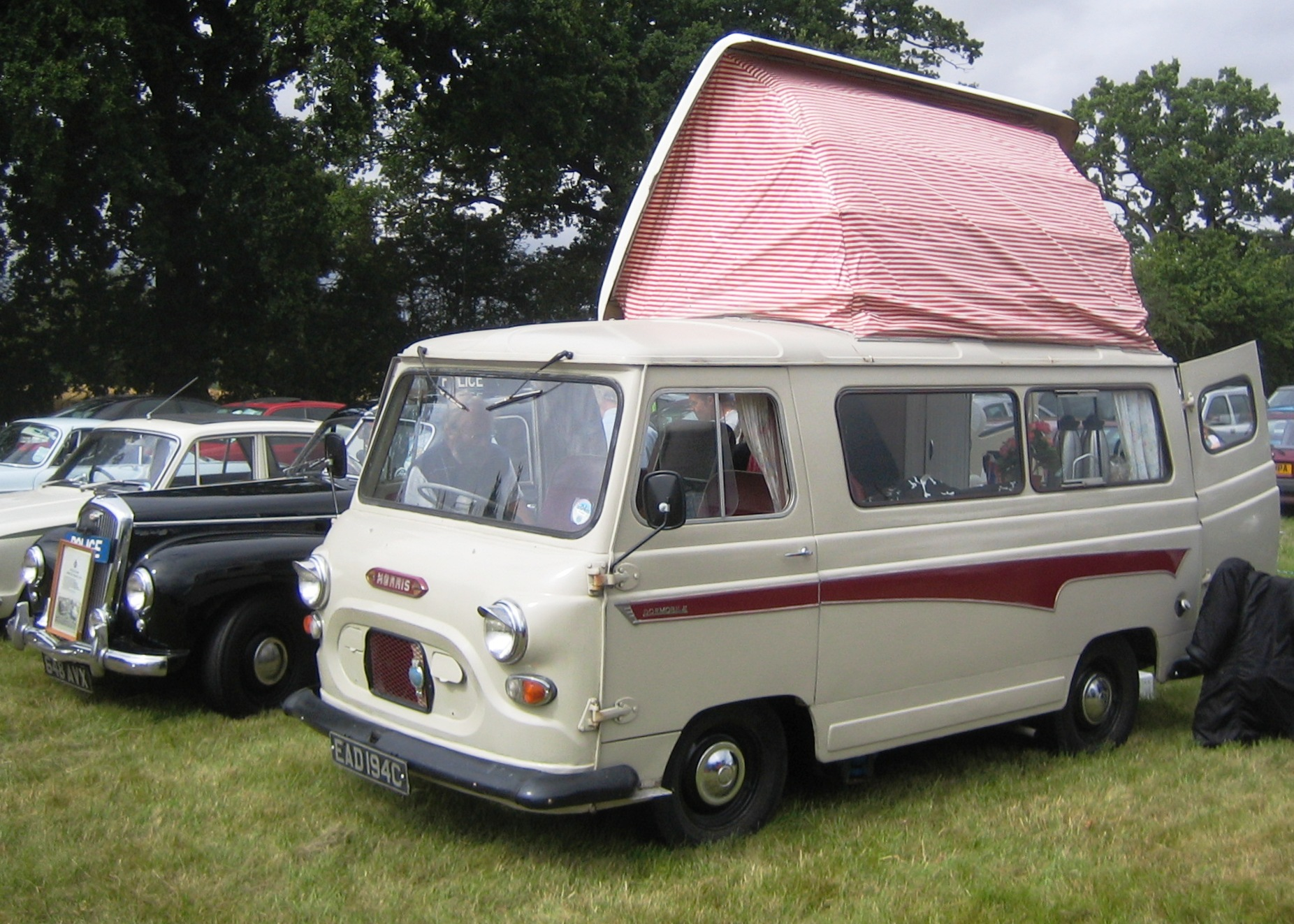
- Dormobile conversion of a Morris J4

Overview
- Manufacturer: Morris Commercial
- Also called: Austin J4; Morris 10/12 cwt BMC J4
- Production: 1960–1974

Body and chassis
- Class: Van

Dimensions
- Length: 162 in (4,115 mm)
- Width: 69 in (1,753 mm)
- Height: 81 in (2,057 mm) (approx)
- Curb weight: 980–1,350 kg (2,161–2,976 lb)

Chronology
- Predecessor: Morris Commercial J-type; Morris Commercial J2; Austin A70 coupé utility
- Successor: Leyland Sherpa

The Morris Commercial J4 is a 10 cwt (0.5 ton) forward-control van (driver's controls in front of front wheels) launched by Morris Commercial in 1960 and produced with two facelifts until 1974.

The van was marketed first as both the Morris J4 and the Austin J4. Following the formation of the British Leyland Motor Corporation in 1968, into which British Motor Corporation (BMC), by then a subsidiary of British Motor Holdings, had been absorbed, the van was branded as the BMC J4.

== Description ==
=== Engine and running gear ===
The van was available with the familiar B series petrol engine in 1622cc form or, at extra cost, with a 1500 cc diesel unit. Stopping power came from drum brakes all round; there was no servo assistance. Suspension was similar to that on the Austin Cambridge/Morris Oxford of the time: the front independent suspension incorporated coil springs and hydraulic lever arm shock absorbers while the rear springing was achieved by semi-elliptic leaf springs.

=== Naming and capacity ===
In the 1960s light vans were often named simply by their load capacity, and the van at the time was often called simply the Morris 10/12 cwt.

=== Developments ===
During its life the van underwent minor improvements under the metal. However, even in 1967 the vans were still shipped with synchromesh on the top three forward gears only. The engine lived in the driver's cabin between the two seats: the van was considered unusually noisy, even in the 1960s. A J4-based petrol-engined motor caravan was tested by Britain's Autocar magazine in 1967. It managed a maximum speed of 63 mph (101 km/h) and a time from 0–50 mph (80 km/h) of 20.2 seconds. The vehicle as tested weighed 2,910 pounds (1,320 kg) and overall petrol consumption for the test came in at 22.7 mpg_{‑imp} (12.4 L/100 km; 18.9 mpg_{‑US}).

This van became a familiar sight on British streets collecting and delivering mail in the Royal Mail livery of the Post Office. Although quite a successful light commercial, it sold mainly by virtue of keen pricing to large fleets, living after 1965 in the shadow of the front engined Ford Transit, as did several other British built 60s/70s light commercials such as the Standard Atlas, Commer FC and the Bedford CA. Whilst competent as a van, the Morris J4 offered a rather poor driving experience even by the standards of the day.

The sliding front doors were replaced by a pair of conventional front-hinged doors for the last model year (1973-74).

== Replacement ==
The J4 was replaced in 1974 by the front-engined Sherpa van, which utilised the rear panel work of the J4 virtually unchanged. The Sherpa remained in production in various forms until 2006. During this time, in various wheel-bases and track widths, it became The Freight Rover, LDV 200, LDV Pilot. The LDV Maxus was a completely new development produced jointly with Daewoo.

During much of this time it also became available as a chassis-cab, pickup, tipper, Luton, Mini-bus and Camper (Motor Caravan.)

== Spain ==
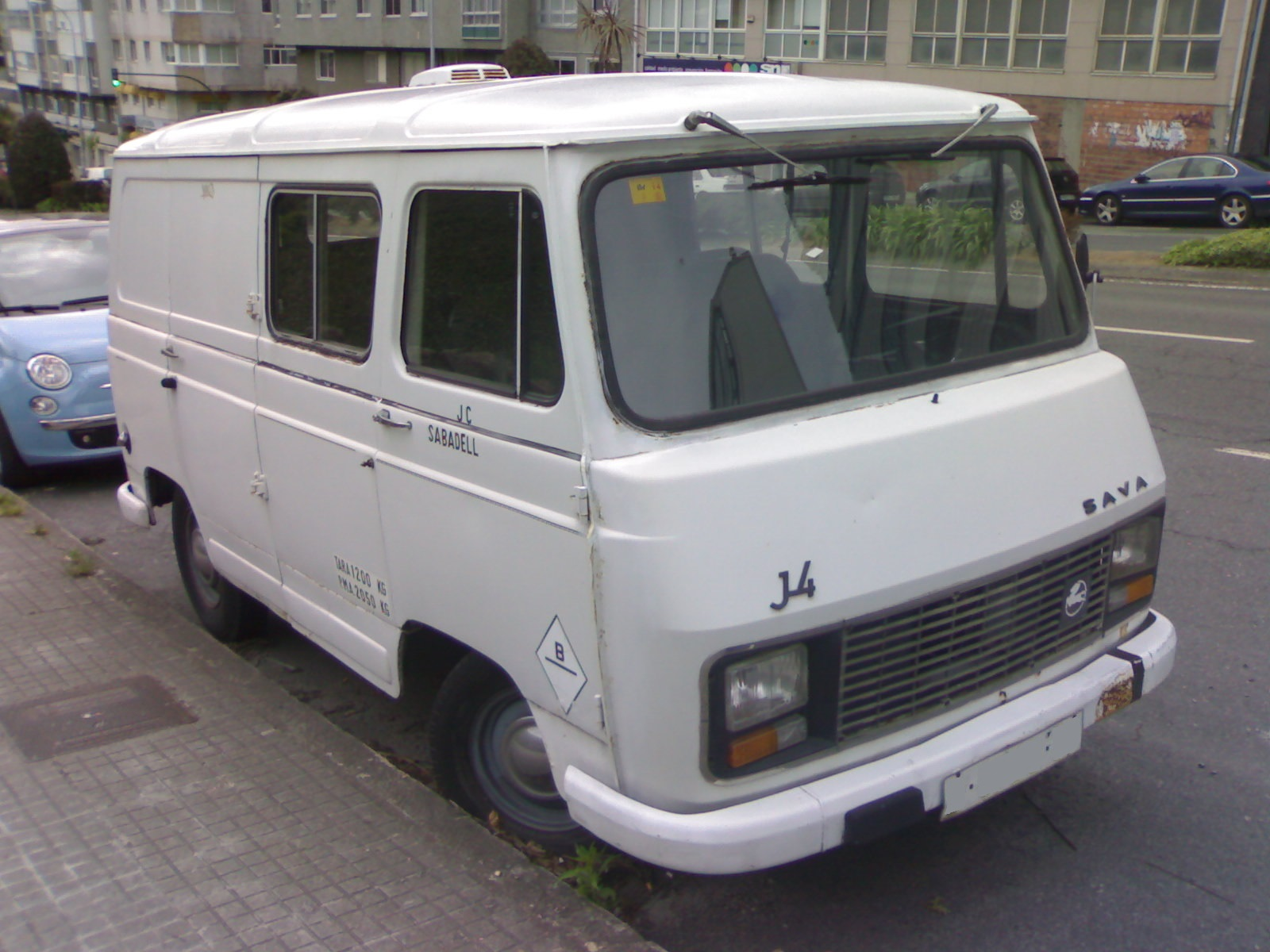
SAVA J4 5730 (1976).

A diesel-powered version of the van was produced in Valladolid, Spain by SAVA ("Sociedad Anónima de Vehículos Automóviles"), between 1965 and 1989 and sold successively under several names including SAVA J4 and Pegaso J4.

The SAVA J4 was a van manufactured in the Spanish city of Valladolid by the company Sociedad Anónima de Vehículos Automóviles (SAVA) between 1965 and 1989, under license from the British Morris Motor Company. It derives from the British Morris Commercial J4 model, also sold first as the Austin J4 and Morris J4 and later BMC J4. After the purchase of SAVA by ENASA, it was sold under the name Pegaso SAVA J4 and with the arrival of the 1980s simply as Pegaso J4.

It was available with a fully enclosed, glazed body for 9 seats, and mixed for 5 seats. Apart from being a van, it was also sold as a capitoné, pickup truck and chassis-cab, in order to adapt a cargo box of the style and with the characteristics that the customer preferred.

Initially, the version of the J4 manufactured by SAVA was the same as the British one, but with left-hand drive. Its trade name in 1965 was SAVA Austin J-4, and later SAVA J-4. As a curious detail, when mounting the gearbox of the British model, the arrangement of the gears was the opposite of the traditional one, that is, 1st and 2nd to the right of the H, and 3rd and 4th to the left. This includes details such as the sliding driver's door that opens inwards, a complement of comfort in a delivery vehicle. It was sold at a base price of 180,000 pesetas. It was also available with conventional doors. The instrument panel changed in 1971, mounting an instrument panel practically identical to that of the SEAT 124, this instrument panel continued to be mounted until 1978. The access to the side door was also modified, extending it to the lower line of the body, including an access step on the combi and minibus models.

It was in 1974 when the J4's body was redesigned. Its commercial name became SAVA J4 5730. It changed the design of the front end, to differentiate itself from the Austin model, adding a black grille with integrated rectangular headlights and a Pegasus logo. Originally it retained the rear lights of the first series, but by 1975 rectangular taillights of new, more modern design were adopted, and the hinges of the front doors were modified. With the incorporation of the new 1,800 engine, in 1977, it was renamed SAVA J4 1000, which mounted the 1800 diesel engine, and SAVA J4 700, which mounted the 1500 diesel engine. The designations "700" or "1000" refer to the net load that the models could carry: 700 kg or 1000 kg, depending on the engine they mounted. Mechanically it improved with the modification of the gearbox, which allowed the synchronization of first gear, avoiding the need for the double clutch when downshifting; and a larger fuel tank. This new version began to sell for 236,000 pesetas. Steel wheels with ventilation holes were also mounted, disappearing the smooth sheet metal with steel hubcaps.

Between the end of 1978 and the beginning of 1979 the bodywork and its external appearance were modernized, adopting new rear doors with wider windows, the windshield wipers went from being mounted on the upper part of the windshield to being mounted on the lower part, the dashboard was modernized, the engine stop was introduced by means of the key, by solenoid, since to date the engine was stopped by pulling a cable that cut off the supply to the injector pump, and later front disc brakes were mounted.

The J4-700 model was renamed the J4-800 and the J4-1000 was renamed J4-1100. The change of name is explained by the increase in the maximum permissible technical weights, although the maximum authorized weights did not change. In 1989 Pegaso ended production of the J4. It was replaced by the Pegaso Ekus.

== Popular culture ==
A London Metropolitan Police J4 (usually referred to as a Black Maria) appears parked in the street on the cover of the Beatles Abbey Road. The van had been driven down by the policeman who came to stop the traffic behind the camera during the photo shoot. There was a second police officer out of sight further ahead up the road stopping any oncoming traffic.

In the film Withnail and I a London Metropolitan Police J4 van overtakes Withnail and Marwood in their Jaguar Mark 2. One of the police officers slides back the door of the van, motioning Withnail to pull over, before ordering him to "get in the back of the van!"

== See also ==
- Commer FC – similarly-sized vans from the same period
- Ford Thames 400E
