= Morris Commercial J-type =

Car model

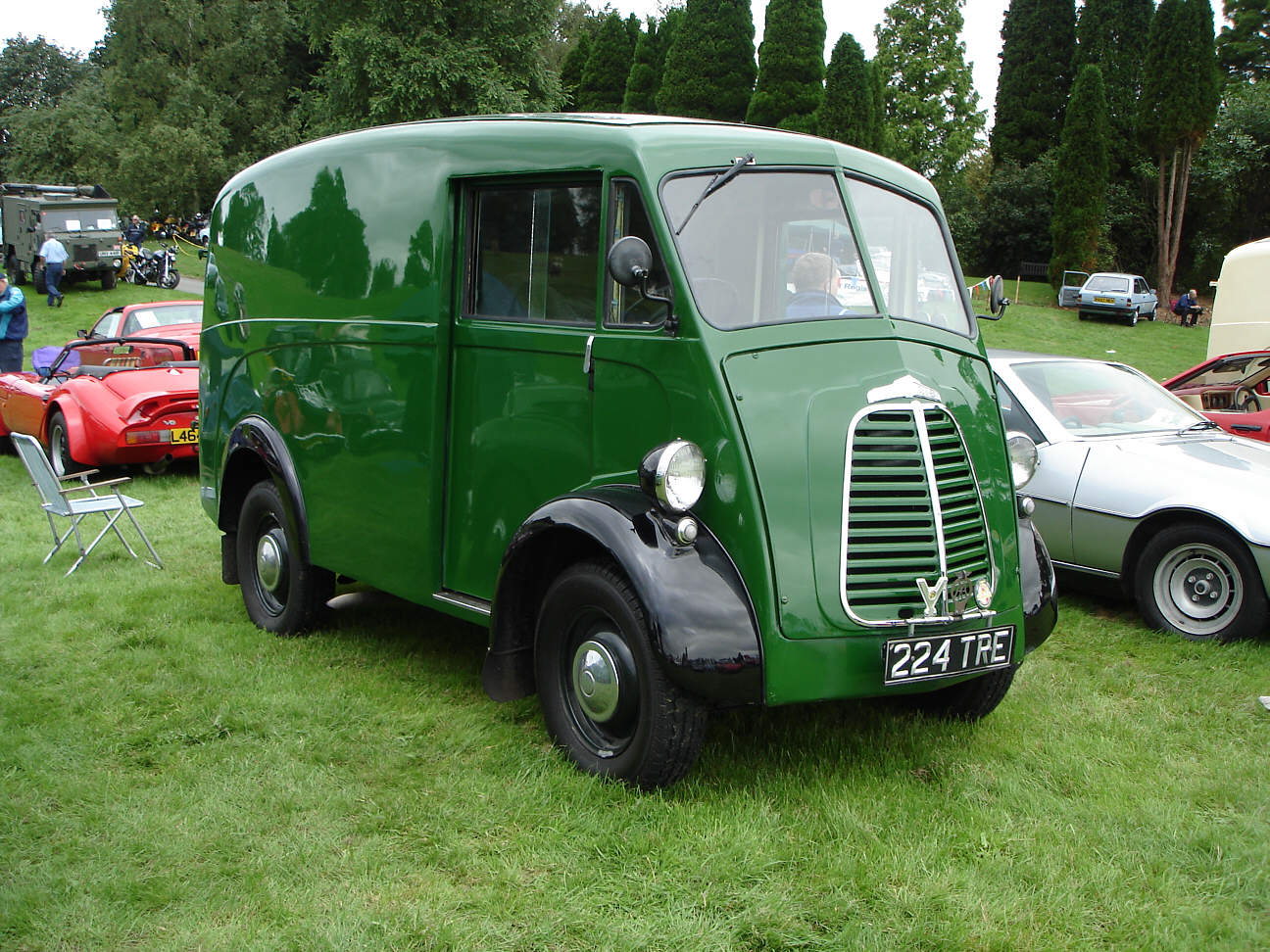
Morris JB van of 1957

The Morris-Commercial J-type is a 10 cwt (0.5 ton) van launched by Morris Commercial in 1949 and produced until 1961. Subsequent to the formation of the British Motor Corporation in 1952, by the merger of Morris' parent company, the Nuffield Organization, and Austin, the Commercial part of the name was dropped and the van was marketed as the Morris J-type from 1954 on.

The van followed the emerging trend of having forward controls and sliding doors on each side. It was made in both left and right hand drive versions. As well as complete vehicles, the J-type was also supplied in chassis form to external body makers and it appeared, amongst other uses, as a pick-up, tipper truck, ice cream van and milk float. Many were bought by the British Post Office and these differed from standard in having rubber front and rear wings.

The J type is fitted with a 1476 cc four-cylinder side-valve engine based on the one used in the contemporary Morris Oxford MO car. Drive to the rear wheels is through a three-speed gearbox and initially a spiral bevel gear type rear axle, later replaced by a hypoid type.

The van was updated to the JB in 1957 when an overhead valve, 1489 cc BMC B-Series engine was fitted along with a four-speed gearbox.

An Austin version of the van appeared in 1957. Known as the Austin 101 it differed from the Morris only in badging and radiator grille styling.

Production ceased early in 1961 after over 48,600 had been made. It was replaced by the Morris J4, while a similar but slightly larger van, the J2, had also been on offer since 1956.

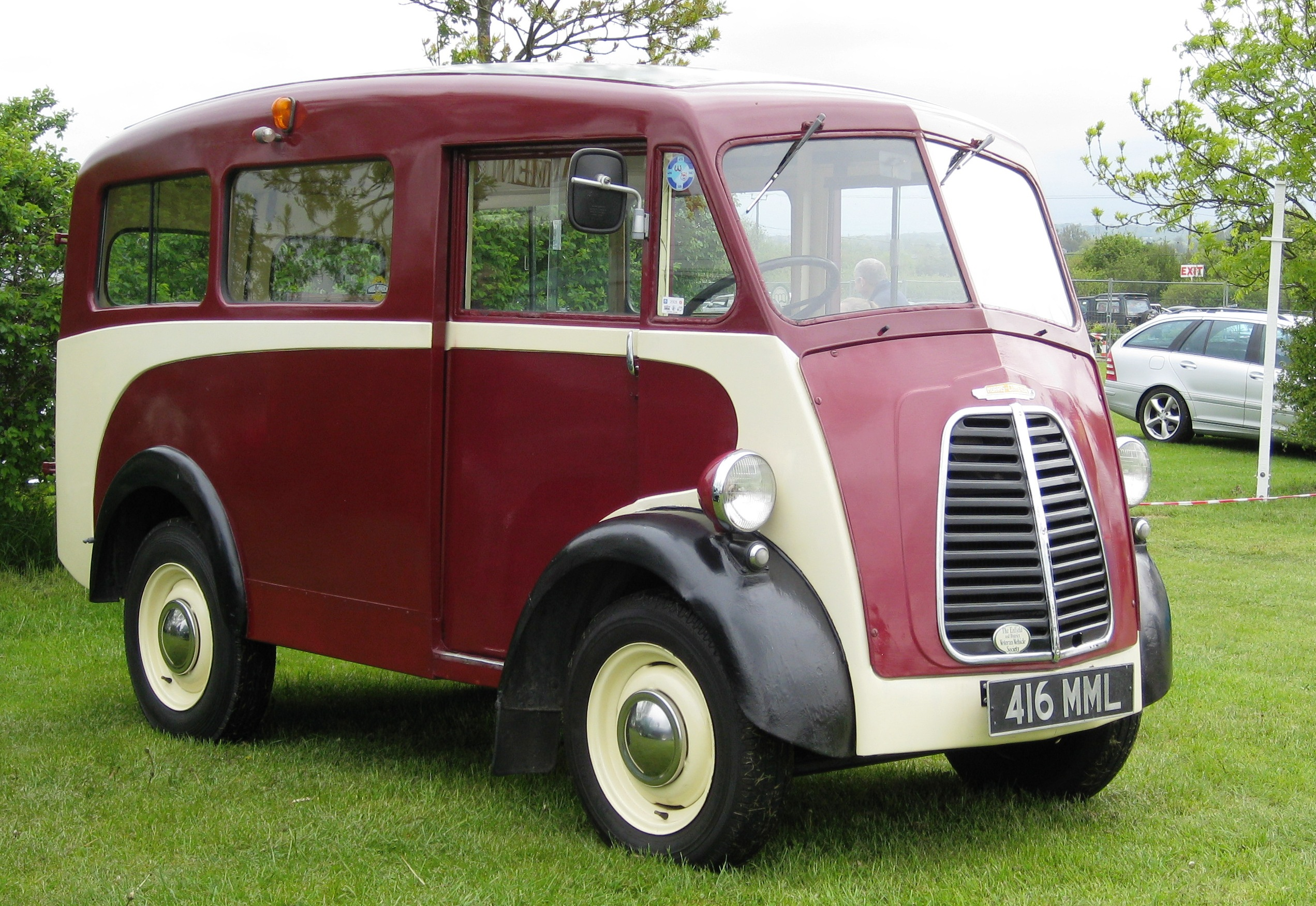
Morris-Commercial J-Type with extra side windows, suitable for carrying extra passengers

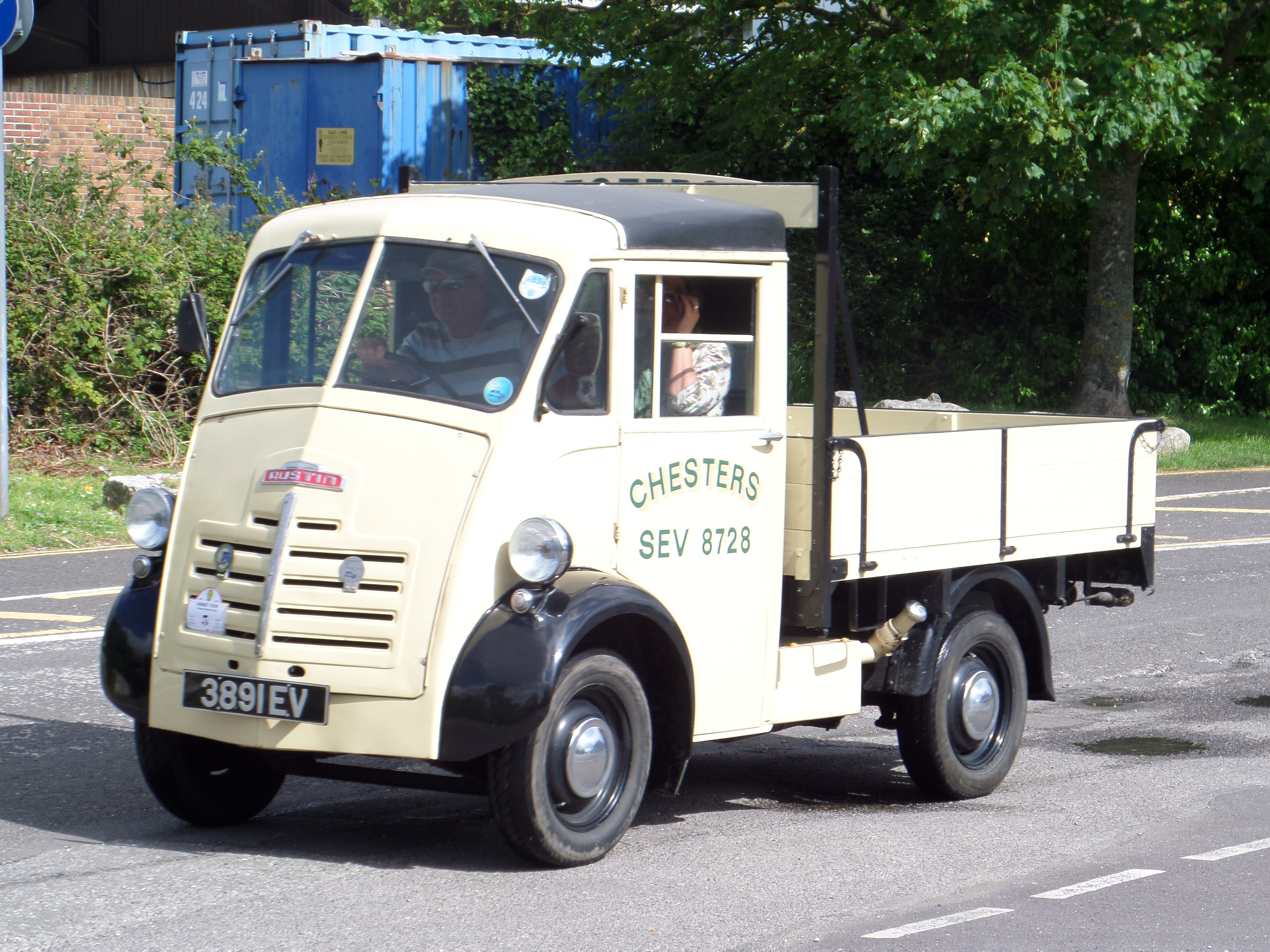
1959-1960 Austin 101 pickup

== Notable J-types ==
A famous Morris Commercial in terms of media exposure is the Reactine van advertising the allergy medication on television and at promotional events.

On 3 February 2013, a J-type became the newest face of Cadbury chocolate in Australia and New Zealand. The "Joymobile" promotion van (or vans) featured in Australia is known to be the vehicle previously partially restored in Hobart, Tasmania, then sold to a 'mystery buyer' and converted and decorated in Cadbury's distinctive purple colour in Sydney. The Television advertisement was filmed in New Zealand.

There was at least one circa 1960 Australian J-type with a custom-made brass body designed to operate in a salty environment for an owner with an oyster lease on the George's River in Sydney.
