= Morris Commercial J2 =

Morris J2

Overview
- Manufacturer: Morris Commercial
- Also called: Austin 152; Austin J2
- Production: 1956–1967
- Assembly: United Kingdom; Australia; New Zealand; Bogotá (Colombia)

Body and chassis
- Class: Van
- Body style: Van; Pickup; Minibus

Powertrain
- Engine: 1.5 L, 1.6 L B-series

Chronology
- Successor: Morris J4; Morris 250 JU

The Morris J2 was a small, forward-control van (driver's cab on top of the engine) launched by Morris Commercial in 1956 and produced until 1967. It was offered with the familiar B-series petrol engine, initially in 1,489 cc (90.9 cu in) form, but this was subsequently enlarged to 1,622 cc (99.0 cu in).

The Beatles were transported in a Morris J2 owned by their then-manager Allan Williams when he drove them to their first residency in Hamburg, Germany, in August 1960.

Until 1961, the van was sold alongside the relatively old-fashioned and slightly smaller Morris JB-type. From 1960 the company also offered the slightly smaller Morris J4 which broadly followed the same overall architecture as the J2.

The J2 van was marketed as both the Morris J2 and the Austin J2 or Austin 152.

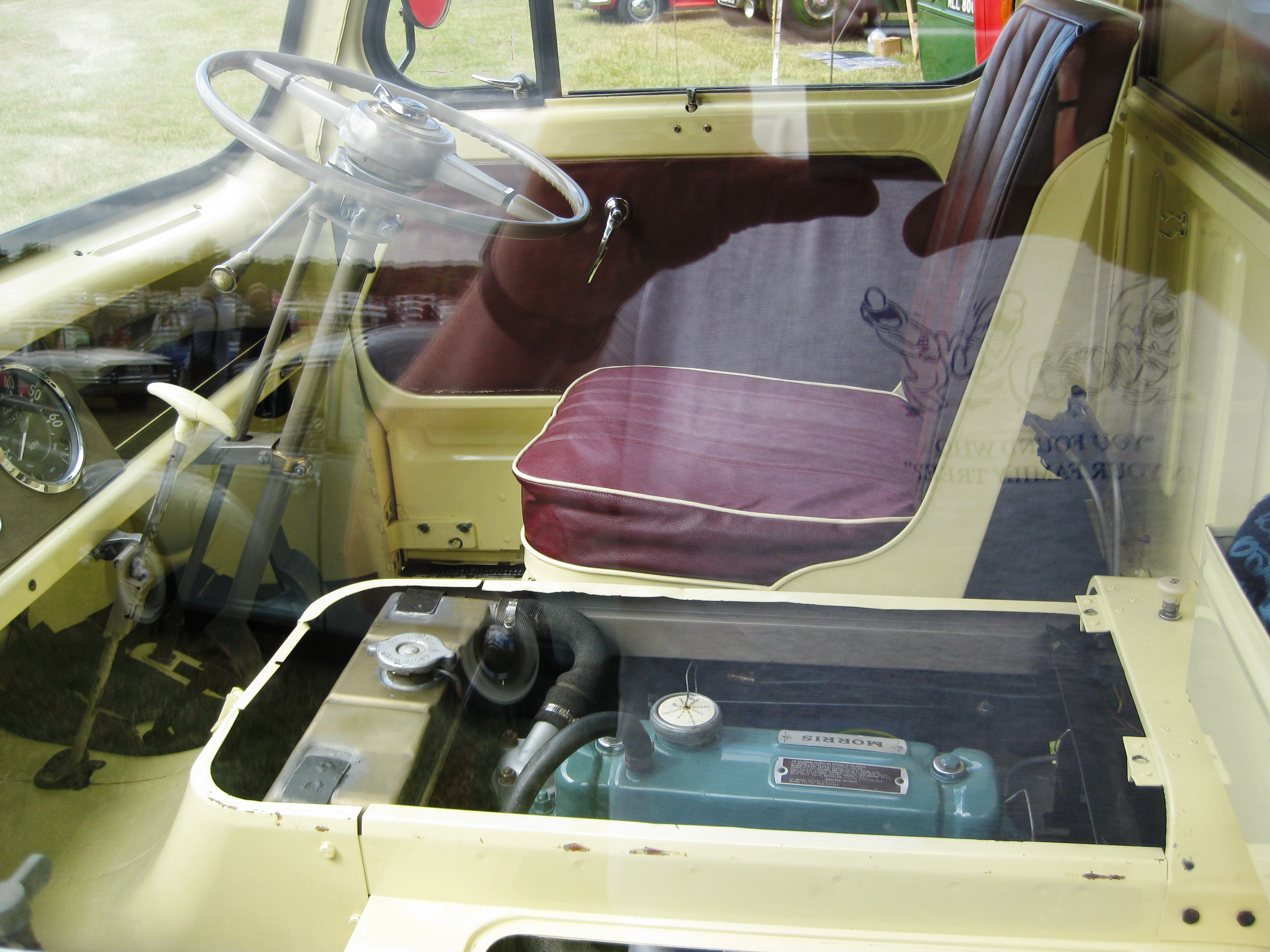
The engine was normally separated from the driver by a steel cover, but its presence in the cab nevertheless ensured a warm journey after a couple of miles of running

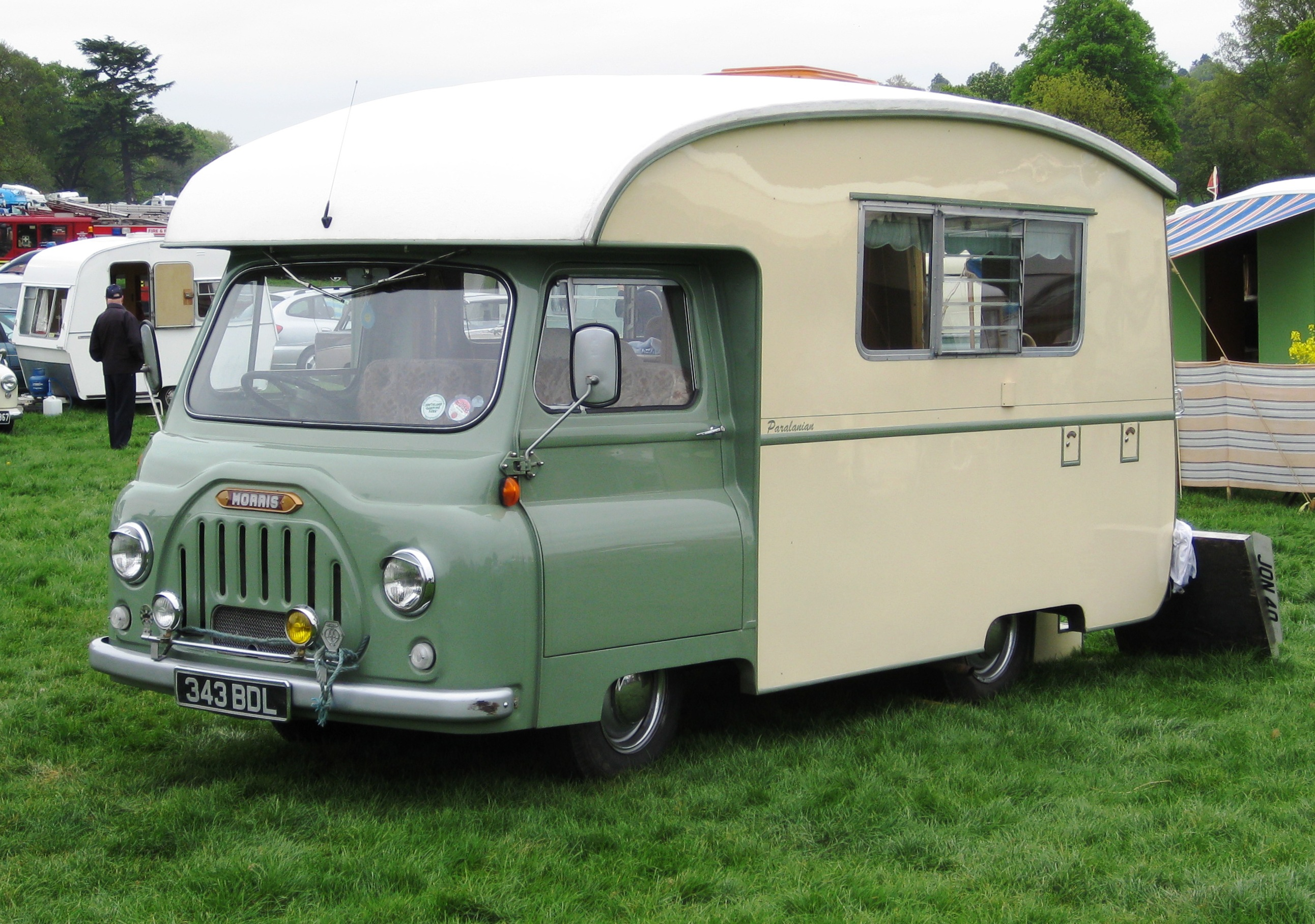
The J2 was also used as the basis for various campervans
