= BMC B-series engine =

B-series engine
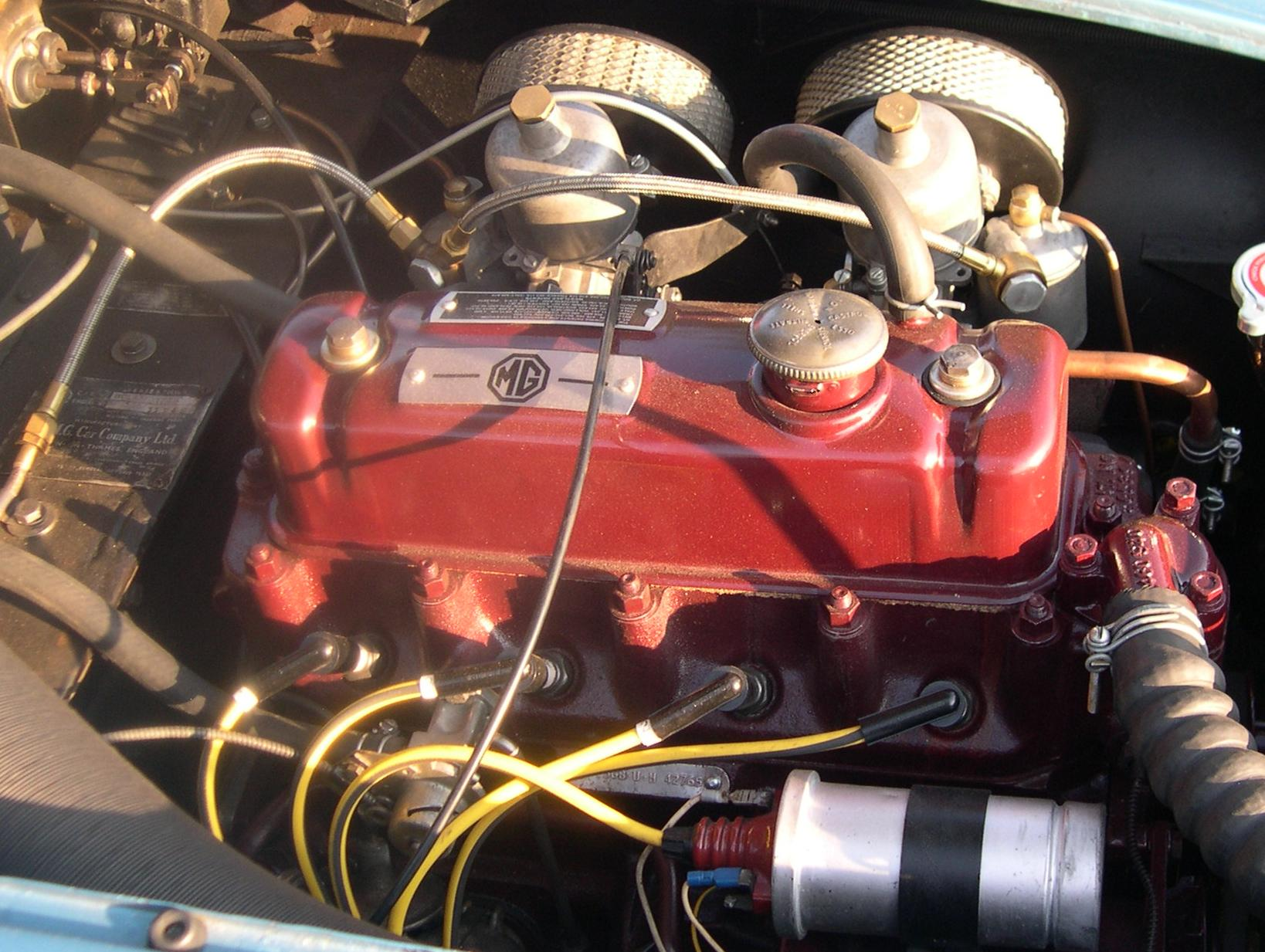

Overview
- Manufacturer: BMC
- Designer: Leonard Lord, John Rix, Eric Bareham
- Production: 1954–1986

Layout
- Configuration: Inline-4 and Inline-6
- Displacement: Inline-fours: 1.2 L (1,199.6 cc); 1.5 L (1,490 cc); 1.6 L (1,588 cc); 1.6 L (1,623 cc); 1.8 L (1,762 cc); 1.8 L (1,798 cc); Inline-six: 2.4 L (2,433 cc)
- Cylinder bore: 65.5 mm (2.6 in); 73 mm (2.9 in); 75.4 mm (3.0 in); 76.2 mm (3.0 in); 80.2 mm (3.2 in)
- Piston stroke: 89 mm (3.5 in)
- Cylinder block material: Cast iron
- Cylinder head material: Cast iron; Aluminum alloy (Twin-Cam)
- Valvetrain: OHV, Twin-Cam
- Compression ratio: 8.3:1-9.9:1

Combustion
- Fuel system: Single or twin carburettors
- Fuel type: Petrol & Diesel versions
- Cooling system: Water-cooled

Output
- Power output: 39–108 bhp (29–81 kW)
- Torque output: 64 lb⋅ft (87 N⋅m)

Chronology
- Predecessor: BMC A-Series engine
- Successor: BMC E-Series; BL O-Series

The BMC B series is a line of straight-4 & straight-6 internal combustion engine mostly used in motor cars, created by British automotive manufacturer Austin Motor Company.

== Design ==
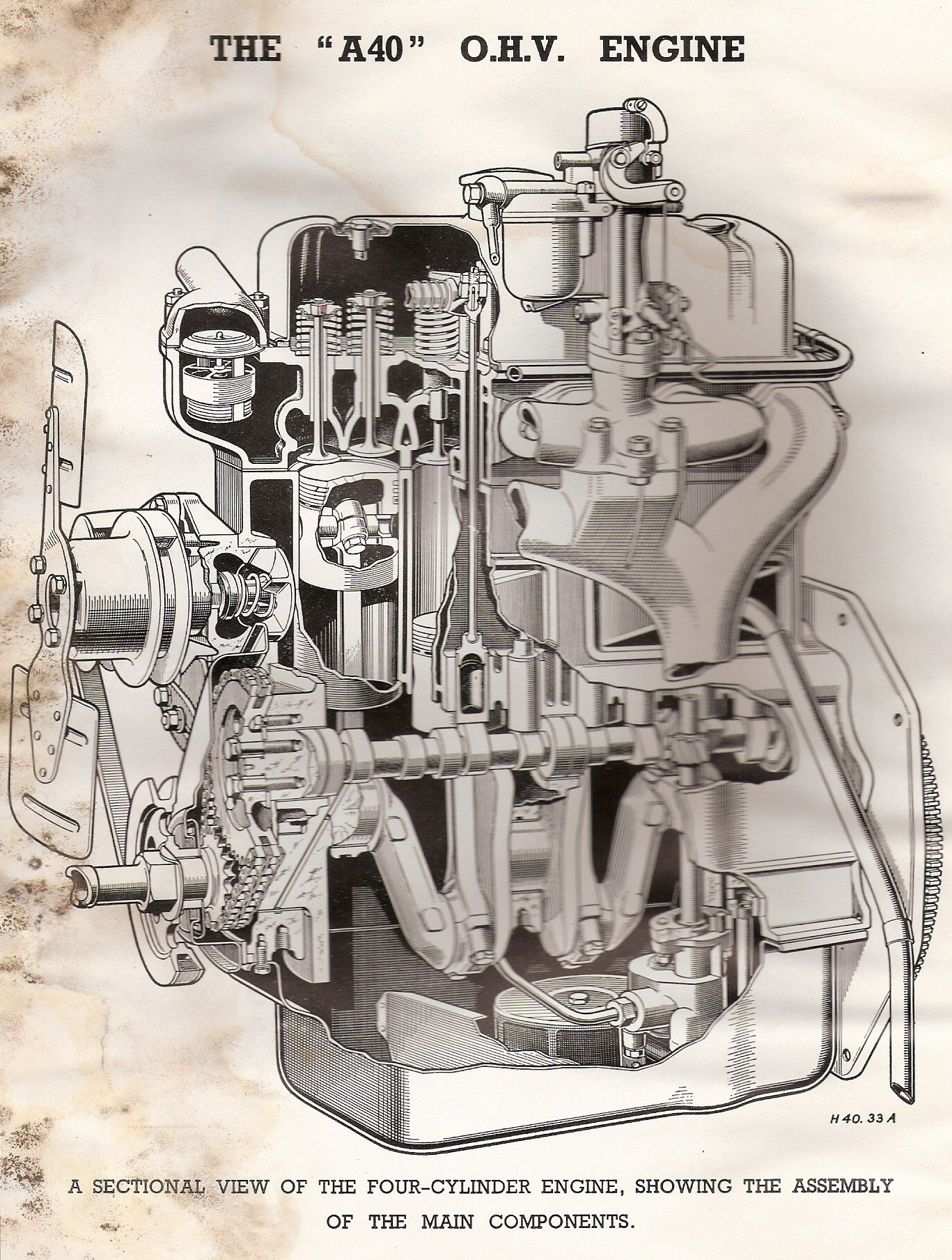
A sectioned illustration of the Austin A40's 1200cc engine – the direct predecessor to the B series

The precursor of the "B" series engine was a 1200 cc Overhead Valve (OHV) engine which was used in the 1947-1952 Austin A40 Devon, and, in slightly modified form, in the 1953 Austin A40 Somerset. This engine had many of the same basic dimensions as one of Austin's pre-war sidevalve engines - the 1125cc engine fitted in the Austin 10 which had the 88.9 mm (3.5 in) stroke common to all later B-Series engines, allowing the use of much of the same installed equipment to produce the block and crankshaft - but to an all-new OHV design. Beyond this relationship to the pre-war Ten's engine, the lineage of the new OHV 1200cc power unit was somewhat complex - in the rest of its design it was in essence a scaled-down version of the 2199cc engine introduced in 1945 on the Austin 16 hp.

The design of this unit were derived from the much larger OHV engine developed for the wartime Austin K5 military truck, which used a 3995cc straight-six engine (minus two cylinders this engine became the 2660cc four-cylinder engine used in the Austin A90 Atlantic and the Austin-Healey 100). The K5 engine was broadly an Austin version of the 3519cc engine built by Bedford for its military trucks, and in turn the Bedford engine was similar in design to the Chevrolet 235 straight-six engine - Bedford and Chevrolet both being part of General Motors. The common features found on all these engines, from the Chevrolet 235 to the Austin 1200cc, include the design of the valve gear and the cylinder head, especially the siamesed cylinder head ports.

The A40 engine was originally drawn up to be produced in two capacities of 990cc and 1200cc to fall into the Eight and Ten tax horsepower classes. Before the A40 was launched, the British government removed the tax horsepower system in favour of a flat tax rate making the smaller capacity redundant. Therefore, only the 1200cc version was built but could not be increased in capacity any further since it was already nearly at the maximum bore and stroke dimensions permitted by the design of the block casting. The long stroke, narrow bore characteristics of engines designed for the British taxation system remained.

Austin realised that eventually they would need an engine that could power many of its forthcoming medium-sized cars, and this would require an engine of at least 1500 cc capacity. Since the A40 Devon engine could not have its capacity enlarged, a new engine needed to be designed and built.

The design of this new engine commenced around January 1952, and was designated as the "B" series. The first production version of the B series retained the same 1200cc capacity as the A40 engine and, superficially, appeared to be identical, with the same valve gear, same cylinder head design, same positioning of its ancillary parts (many of which were interchangeable with the older engine) and so on. But the B-series block and head were slightly larger in both length and width and the block had thicker cylinder wall castings making the new engine heavier than the A40 motor. This was to allow room for enlargement of the cylinder bore to provide the larger capacities foreseen by BMC.

The stroke was retained at 88.9 mm (3.5 in) and was never altered. Originally of approximately 1.2 Litre capacity, later displacements ranged widely from 1.2 L to 2.4 L, the latter being a six-cylinder variant which was only produced in Australia. The most common engine sizes were 1.5 L and 1.8 L and saw service in a number of vehicles. This included a version of the engine built under license in India by Hindustan Motors for its Ambassador series of cars. Petrol versions were produced in the greatest numbers, but diesel versions exist for both cars and marine applications.

Meanwhile, the earlier 990cc displacement would later indirectly resurface in Japan from the late-1950s at Nissan after the company had engaged an American engine specialist called Donald Stone formerly of Willys-Overland as a consultant, Nissan was trying to develop a new 1-litre engine at the time for the 1957 Nissan Bluebird (210/211), but as Stone pointed out, it would have cost a fortune. His suggestion was to shorten the cylinder block of the 1.5-litre B-Series licence built in Japan as the 1H engine, thus the 1-litre Nissan C engine also known as the "Stone engine" was born being manufactured on Austin's old transfer machines. When it was later increased to 1.2-litres from 1958, it was named the Nissan E engine. This was followed by the Nissan J engine, distinctly different from the earlier engines yet similar in many ways.

== Construction ==
The engine was of conventional construction with a one-piece crankcase and cylinder block in cast iron with the crankcase extending down to the lowest level of the main bearing caps with a cylinder head, also usually in cast iron, and a sump made from pressed steel for rear-wheel drive vehicles. Early engines used a three-bearing crankshaft, but later engines used five bearings. On all except the rare twin overhead camshaft variant, the camshaft, which was chain driven and mounted low in the block, operated the overhead valves via pushrods and rocker arms. The two inlet ports in the non-crossflow cylinder head were shared between cylinders 1 + 2 and 3 + 4 and the three exhaust ports between cylinder 1, 2 + 3 and 4. Valve clearance was adjustable by screws and locknuts on the rocker arms. An unconventional characteristic of the engine is that the bore spacing is not constant between all four bores. The distance from cylinder 1 to 2 is 3.4375"; 2 to 3 =3.875"; and 3 to 4 =3.4375".

The B-series shared its basic layout and general appearance and many design features, such as the heart-shaped combustion chambers and siamese inlet ports designed by Harry Weslake, with the smaller BMC A-series engine. One difference was that the cylinder block of the B-series had a full-depth skirt. This provided excellent bottom-end strength and made the engine highly durable and suitable for developing into diesel versions in later years.

== Engine types ==
=== 1.2 litre engines ===
The 1.2 L (1,199.6 cc) version was the first version of the engine. The bore and the stroke was 65.5 mm × 89 mm (2.58 in × 3.50 in). The maximum power output was 39 bhp (29 kW) at 4300 rpm.

After the formation of British Motor Corporation (BMC) the new B Series engine was used in the following vehicles:

- 1954–56 Morris Cowley
- 1954–56 Austin A40 Cambridge
- 1954–55 Nash Metropolitan 1200 (used unique "2G" engine prefix)
- Massey-Harris Combine Harvester

=== 1.5 litre engines ===
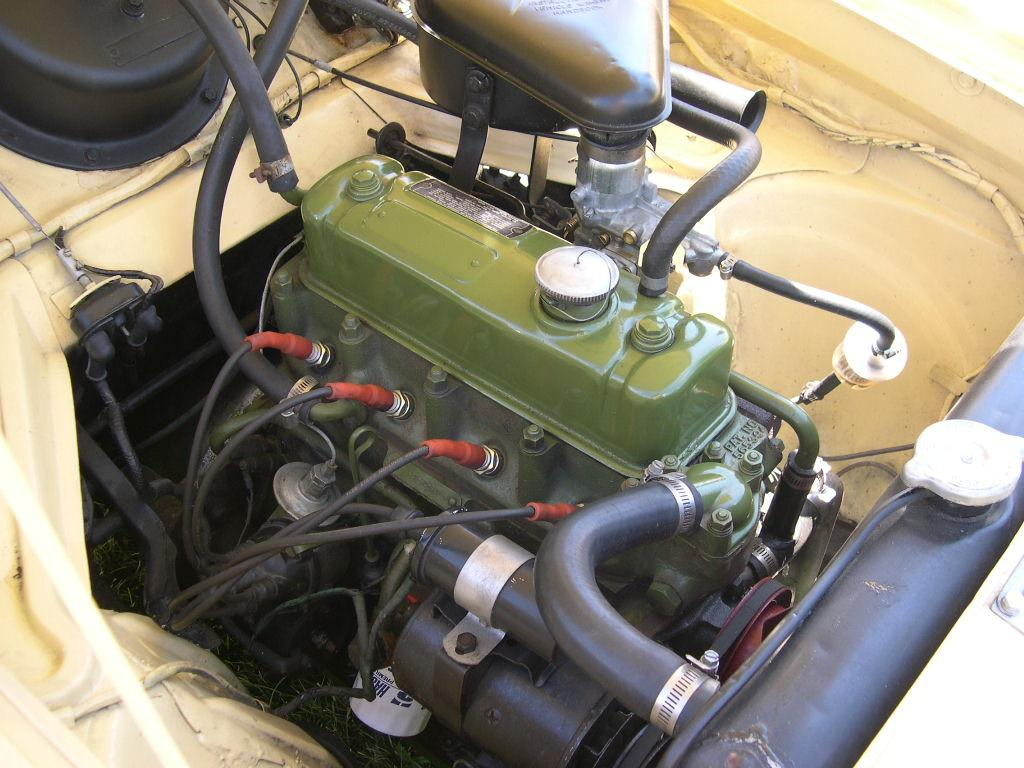
B-series 1500 engine in a Nash Metropolitan Series 3

The 1.5 L (1,489 cc) version was first used in 1953 in the MG Magnette ZA in twin carburettor version and in 1954 in the Morris Oxford Series II and Austin Cambridge. In 1957, it was used in the original MGA. Output in twin carburettor form was 68–72 bhp (51–54 kW) and 55 bhp (41 kW) with a single carburettor. Bore and stroke was 73 mm × 89 mm (2.9 in × 3.5 in).

There was also a diesel version of this engine size. Power output was 40 bhp (30 kW) at 4,000 rpm and torque 64 lb⋅ft (87 N⋅m) at 1,900 rpm. The 1.5–litre diesel engines were made in India by Hindustan Motors for many decades until the production of the Ambassador was phased out in 2013. They are very popular amongst the taxicab market in India even today. This engine was also license built by Nissan in Japan in the late 1950s as the 1H engine.

The 1.5 B-Series would also form the basis of the 1958 Perkins 4.99 / 1.6 L (1,622 cc) diesel, which was fitted in cars, boats and commercial vehicles including London Taxis like the Beardmore Mk7 Paramount taxi, Ford Thames 400E, early Ford Transits, Bedford CA, Vauxhall Victor, Hillman Minx, Standard Ensign and Moskvitch 407. In the mid-1960s the 4.99 was upgraded to become the 4.107 / 1.8 L (1,760 cc) and later the classic 4.108 / 1.8 L (1,760 cc), powering the Bedford CF, Alfa Romeo F12/A12, Alfa Romeo Giulia, SEAT 131 and Moskvitch 408 as well as being used extensively in marine applications, farm equipment and Mustang/OMC skid-steer loaders. The 4.108 continued in production until 1992 the last application being for the auxiliary power unit fitted on British Army tanks in the Gulf War to power the essential air conditioning equipment. A total of almost 500,000 engines were made in Peterborough, with small numbers built elsewhere from kits. The peak production volume was reached in 1970, when almost 30,000 were made.

Applications:
- 1954–61 Morris Oxford Series II, III, V & VI
- 1956–59 Morris Cowley
- 1956–62 Nash Metropolitan 1500
- 1955–58 MGA
- 1953–61 MG Magnette ZA, ZB, & Mark III
- 1956-61 Morris J2 1/2-ton vans
- 1956–58 Austin A50 Cambridge
- 1958–61 Austin A55 Cambridge
- 1956–58 Wolseley 15/50
- 1957–65 Wolseley 1500
- 1958–61 Wolseley 15/60
- 1957–61 Morris Commercial JB-type half-ton vans
- 1957-61 ((Austin 101)) half-ton vans
- 1957–65 Riley 1.5
- 1959–61 Riley 4/68
- 1959–65 Rochdale Olympic
- 1958–62 Morris Major and Austin Lancer Series I/II
- 1957–63 Tempo Matador
- Hindustan Ambassador
- Hindustan Contessa
- International Harvester "Metro-Mite" delivery truck
- Navigator 1500 marine engine
- 1958–60 TVR Grantura Mark I
- 1960–62 TVR Grantura Mark II & IIA
- 1958–59 Elva Courier

=== Twin-Cam engines ===
A special Twin-Cam (DOHC) version of the 1.6 L (1,588 cc) B-series engine was produced for the MGA. Output was 108 bhp (81 kW) at 6700 rpm in the high-compression (9.9:1) version and 100 bhp (75 kW) in the optional low-compression (8.3:1) version. The engine block was cast iron, but the crossflow eight-port cylinder head was of aluminium alloy. Drive to the twin camshafts was by chain from a gear-driven, half-speed shaft running in the space that would have been occupied by the conventional camshaft.

This engine gained a reputation for being unreliable in service, especially in the high-compression version which needed high-octane fuel, but this has now been largely overcome. The piston burning habits — thought to be the result of ignition timing — was later discovered to be due to a vibration induced lean burn situation involving the float bowls, easily correctable by flexibly mounting the carburettors. A total of 2,111 cars were built, in both coupé and roadster versions.

A very few engines with the special displacement of 1.8 L (1,762 cc) were produced for racing purposes.

Applications:

- 1958–60 MGA Twin-Cam

=== 1.6 litre engines ===
The engine was enlarged to 1.6 L (1,588 cc) in 1958 by increasing the bore to 75.4 mm (2.97 in).

Applications:

- 1959–61 MGA 1600
- 1960–62 TVR Grantura Mark II, IIA
- 1959-61 Elva Courier Mark II

=== 1.6 litre Mark II engines ===
The engine was enlarged to 1.6 L (1,622 cc) in 1961 with another bore increase, this time to 76.2 mm (3.00 in).

Applications:
- 1961–62 MGA Mark II
- 1961–69 Austin Cambridge A60
- 1961-67 Morris J2 1/2-ton vans
- 1961–71 Morris Oxford VI
- 1961–71 Wolseley 16/60
- 1961–69 Riley 4/72
- 1961–68 MG Magnette Mark IV
- 1961–67 Austin 152 & Morris J2 1/2-ton van
- 1974–78 Sherpa van
- 1962–64 Morris Major Elite
- 1963–66 Tempo Matador
- 1966–67 Hanomag Matador
- 1967–73 Hanomag F20, Hanomag F25, Hanomag F30, Hanomag F35
- 1970–73 Mercedes-Benz L206, Mercedes-Benz L306
- Navigator 1600 marine engine
- 1962–64 TVR Grantura Mark III
- 1963-64 Elva Courier Mark III

The 1.6 L (1,622 cc) B series also formed the basis of the "Blue Streak" engine developed by BMC Australia for use in the locally-built Austin Freeway and Wolseley 24/80 models, both in turn variants of the existing Austin A60 Cambridge. The "Blue Streak" was an inline-6 development of the B series, adding two extra cylinders to create a 2.4 L (2,433 cc) engine. Different market demands in Australia required the fitting of a six-cylinder engine to a car the size of BMC's mid-range Farina model and the corporate C-series engine would not fit, requiring the development of the unique "Blue Streak" engine. Both models were withdrawn in 1965 and no further use of the engine was made.

=== 1.8 litre engines ===
The engine was enlarged again to 1.8 L (1,798 cc) in 1962. Bore was 80.2 mm (3.16 in) and stroke was still 89 mm (3.5 in), power varied by application with typically 94 bhp (70 kW) at 5,500 rpm in twin carburettor format as used in the MGB and 85 bhp (63 kW) in single carburettor format as used in the Morris Marina. The engine at first had a three-bearing crankshaft with a five-bearing version appearing in 1964.

There was also a diesel version of this capacity, used in the Leyland Sherpa van with a power output of 56 bhp (42 kW) at 4,250 rpm, and built under license in Turkey for many years. It is still widely used on narrowboats on the canals of the UK.

Applications:
- 1969 Probe 16
- 1962–80 MGB
- 1964–75 BMC ADO17 ("Landcrab") Austin 1800
- 1967–72 BMC ADO17 ("Landcrab") Wolseley 18/85
- 1966–75 BMC ADO17 ("Landcrab") Morris 1800
- 1975–78 Princess 1.8
- 1971–78 Morris Marina 1.8
- 1964–67 TVR Grantura Mark III and IV
- 1964-65 Elva Courier Mark IV
- 1974–78 Leyland Sherpa van
- 1973–75 Hanomag F20, Hanomag F25, Hanomag F30, Hanomag F35 (de)
- 1973–77 Mercedes-Benz L207
- 1973–78 Mercedes-Benz L307

=== 2.0 litre engines ===
2-litre B-Series prototype was designed by BMC engine-man Stan Johnson in 1964–65. This unit displaced 1,998 cc, power output was 106 hp and featured siamesed cylinder bores and offset conrods in order to use the existing 1.2/1.5-litre cylinder block. This engine never went beyond the prototype stage.

=== 2.4 litre engines ===
There was a 2.4 L (2,433 cc) six-cylinder unit, named "Blue Streak", which was used in the Australian Austin Freeway and Wolseley 24/80.

== Engine numbering ==
There were two series of engine numbers used; BMC changed the system at the end of 1956.

=== Numbering system, 1936 to 1956 ===
As an example numbers were of the style "BP15GB" followed by the engines serial number, where:

- BP = B series engine with P for pushrod (Overhead Valve)
- 15 = capacity
- G = MG (for full list of codes see reference below)
- B = This final letter denotes the engine version.

=== Numbering system, 1957 to 1970 ===
As an example numbers were of the style "15GB-U-H" plus a serial number, where:

- 15 = capacity
- G = MG (other letters were: A = Austin, B = Industrial, H = Miscellaneous, J = Commercial, M = Morris, R = Riley, V = Vanden Plas and W = Wolseley )
- B = B series engine
- U = Central gear change (other letters were: A = Automatic, M = Manumatic clutch, N = Column change, O = Overdrive, P = Police, DA = Close ratio gearbox. Note letter A is in a smaller font size).
- H = High compression (alternatively L = Low compression)

=== Numbering system, 1970 onwards ===
Beginning in the early 1970s the numbering system was simplified to "18 V" plus a serial number, where 18 represents the capacity and V = vertical, i.e. longitudinal (in-line, not vee-arranged) engine with rear-wheel drive, and H = Horizontal, i.e. transverse engine with front-wheel drive.

There was sometimes a country indicator after the first part of the code, e.g. "18V-Z" was used for some United States (except California) MG MGB engines.

== See also ==
- BMC A-series engine
