= MG MGA =

MGA
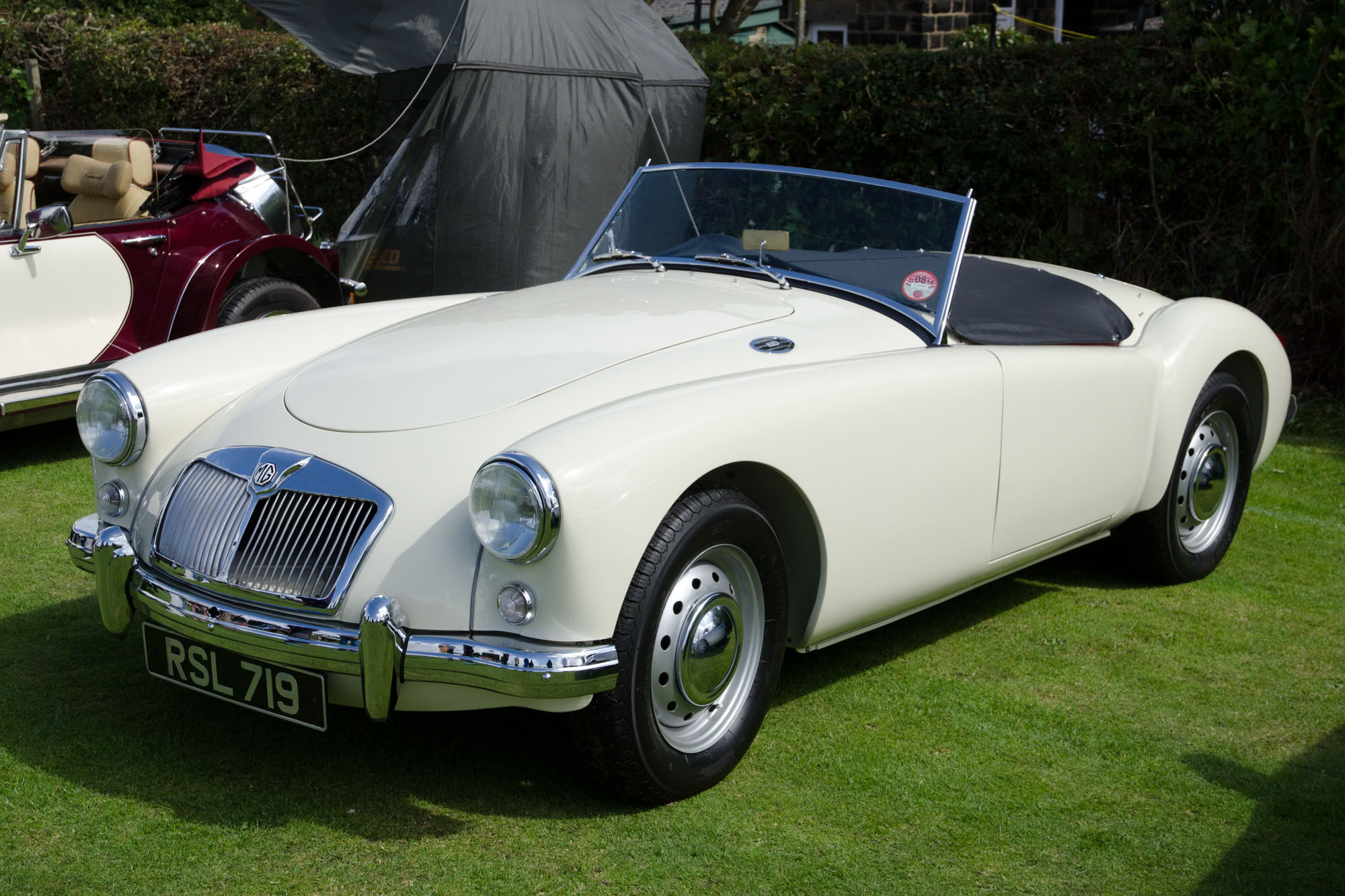
- 1956 MGA 1500

Overview
- Manufacturer: MG (BMC)
- Production: 1955–1962
- Assembly: United Kingdom: Abingdon, England; Australia: Enfield (BMC Australia)
- Designer: Syd Enever

Body and chassis
- Class: Sports car
- Body style: 2-door roadster 2-door coupe
- Layout: FR layout

Dimensions
- Wheelbase: 94 in (2,388 mm)
- Length: 156 in (3,962 mm)
- Width: 58 in (1,473 mm)
- Height: 50 in (1,270 mm)
- Curb weight: 1988 pounds (902 kg)

Chronology
- Predecessor: MG TF Midget
- Successor: MGB

The MGA is a sports car that was produced by MG from 1955 until 1962.

The MGA replaced the MG TF 1500 Midget and represented a complete styling break from MG's earlier sports cars. Announced on 26 September 1955 the car was officially launched at the Frankfurt Motor Show. A total of 101,476 units were marketed by the end of production in July 1962, the vast majority of which were exported. 5869 cars were sold on the home market, and the MGA was replaced by the MGB.

== Design ==
The MGA design dates back to 1951, when MG designer Syd Enever created a streamlined body for George Philips' TD Le Mans car. The new bodywork traded the MG TF's articulated fenders and running board for ponton styling, with a single styled envelope fully enclosing the width and uninterrupted length of a car.

The TF featured a high driver seating position. A new chassis was designed with the side members further apart and the floor attached to the bottom rather than the top of the frame sections. A prototype was built and shown to the BMC chairman Leonard Lord. He turned down the idea of producing the new car as he had just signed a deal with Donald Healey to produce Austin-Healey cars two weeks before. Falling sales of the traditional MG models caused a change of heart, and the car, initially to be called the UA-series, was brought back. As it was so different from the older MG models it was called the MGA, the "first of a new line" to quote the contemporary advertising. Rather than the originally intended XPAG unit, the car was fitted with the new straight-4 "BMC B series" engine from the MG Magnette saloon, coupled to a four-speed gearbox. Unlike the coupe, the convertible had no exterior door handles.

It was a body-on-frame design, and suspension was independent with coil springs and wishbones at the front and a rigid axle with semi-elliptic springs at the rear. Steering was by rack and pinion. The car was available with either wire-spoked or steel-disc road wheels.

While the make (or marque) is MG, the model was named MGA by John Thornley in 1954.

== MGA ==
MG MGA
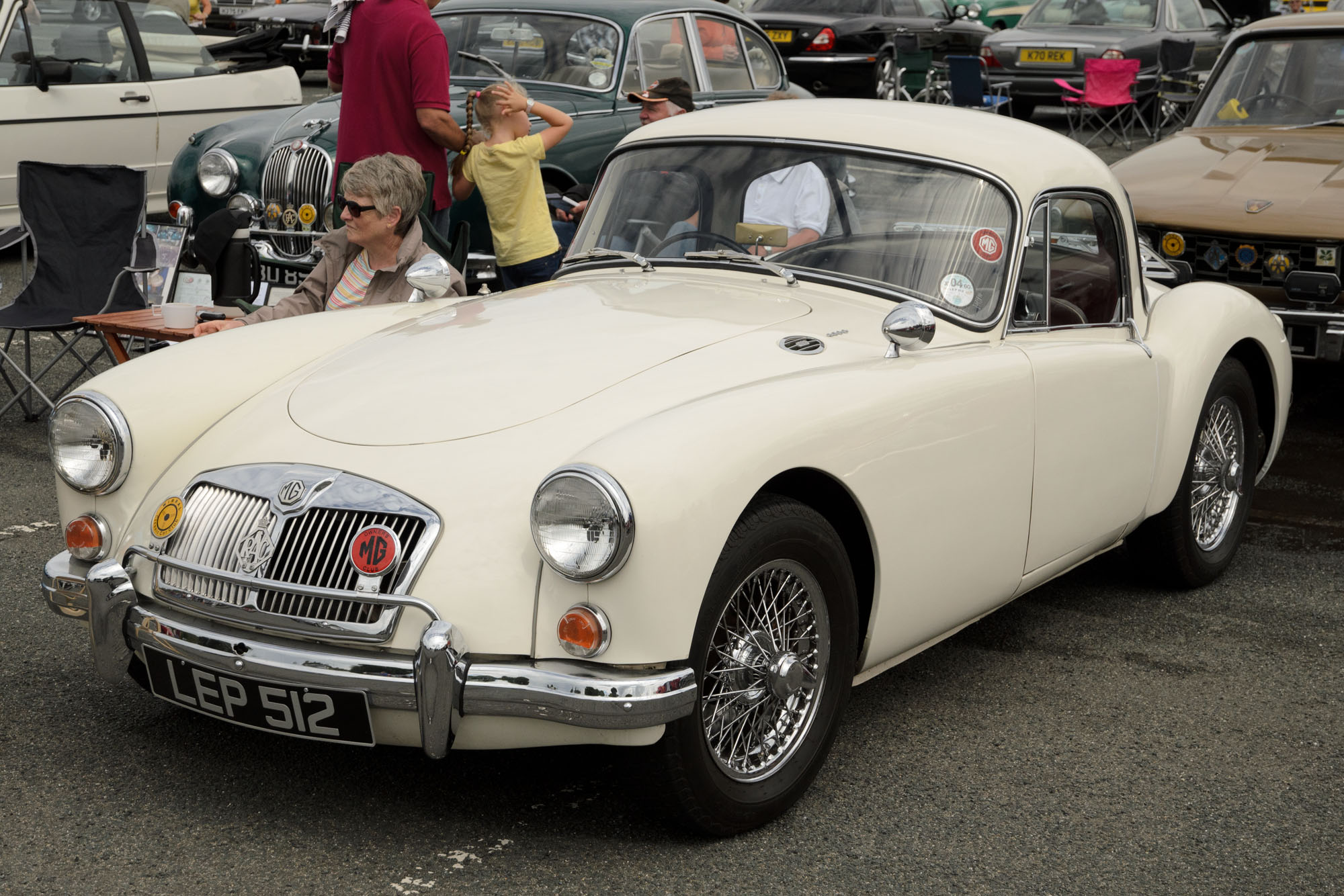

Overview
- Production: 1955–1959

Powertrain
- Engine: 1,489 cc (1.5 L) B-Series I4

The 1489 cc engine fitted with twin H4 type SU Carburettors produced 68 hp (51 kW) at first, but was soon uprated to 72 hp (54 kW). Lockheed hydraulic drum brakes were used on all wheels. A coupé version was also produced, bringing the total production of standard MGAs to 58,750.

An early open car tested by British magazine The Motor in 1955 had a top speed of 97.8 mph (157.4 km/h) and could accelerate from 0–60 mph (97 km/h) in 16.0 seconds. A fuel consumption of 26.7 miles per imperial gallon (10.6 L/100 km; 22.2 mpg_{‑US}) was recorded. The test car cost £844 including taxes.

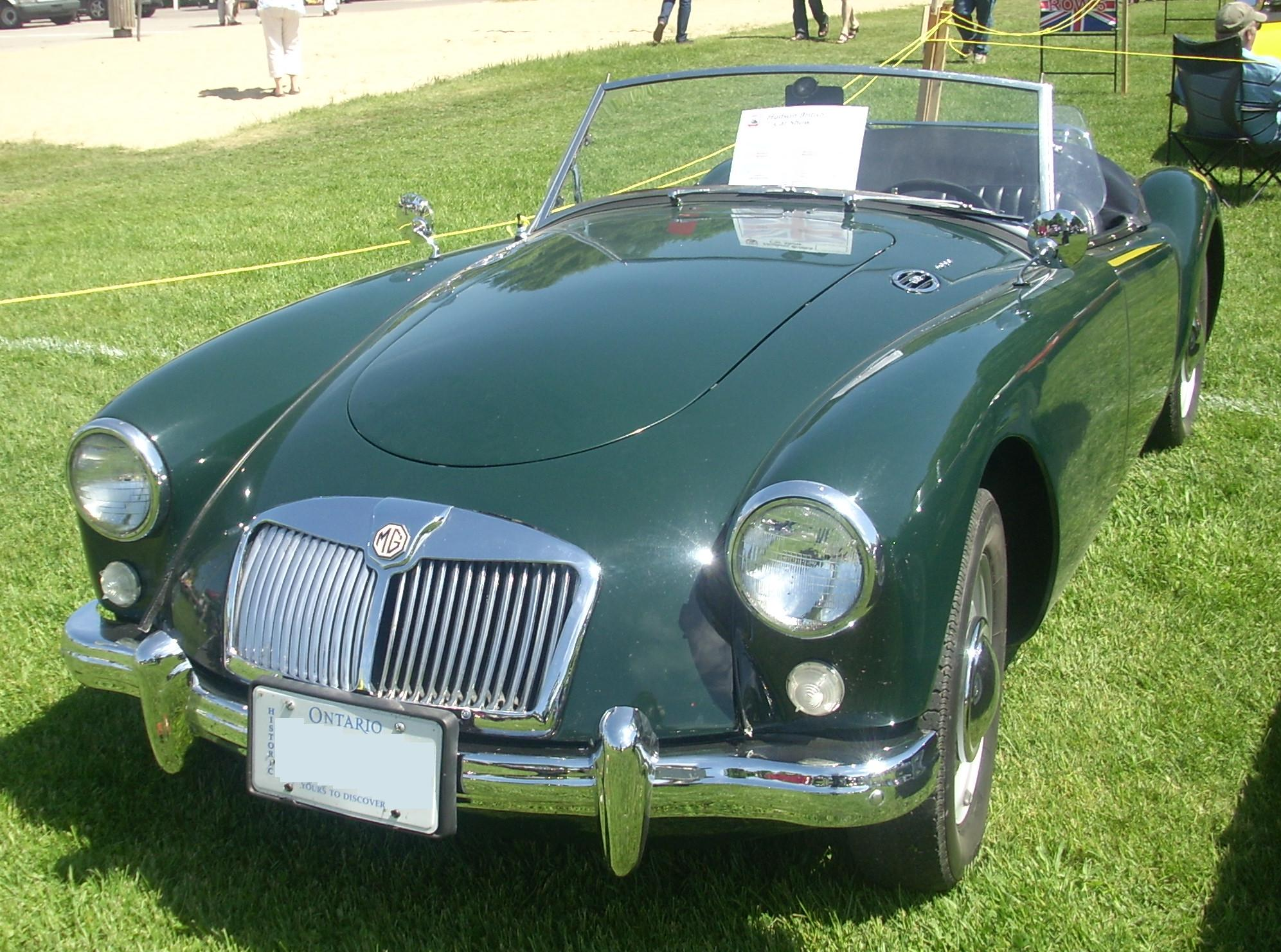
1958 MG MGA roadster (North America)

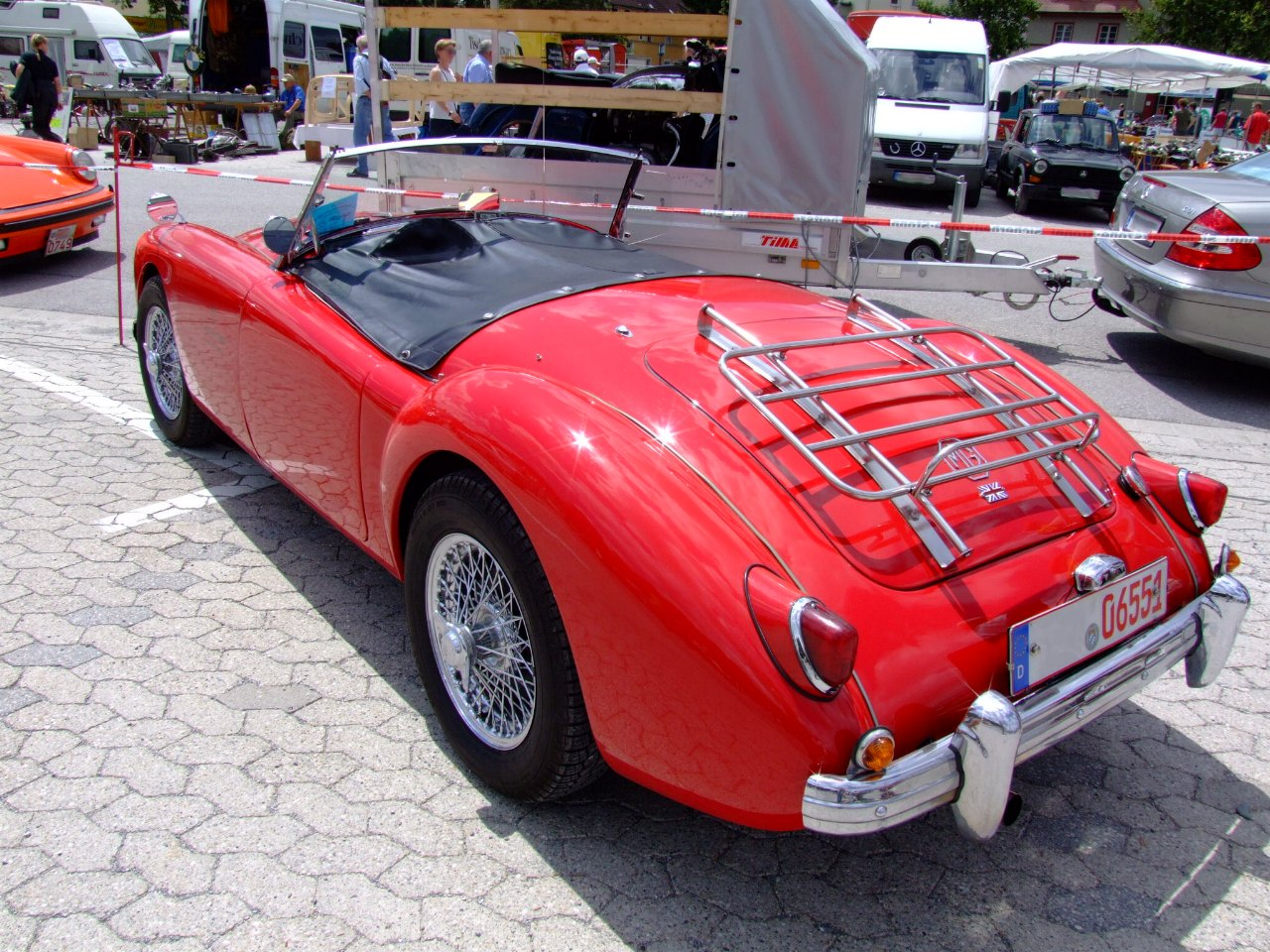
MGA 1500 from rear quarter

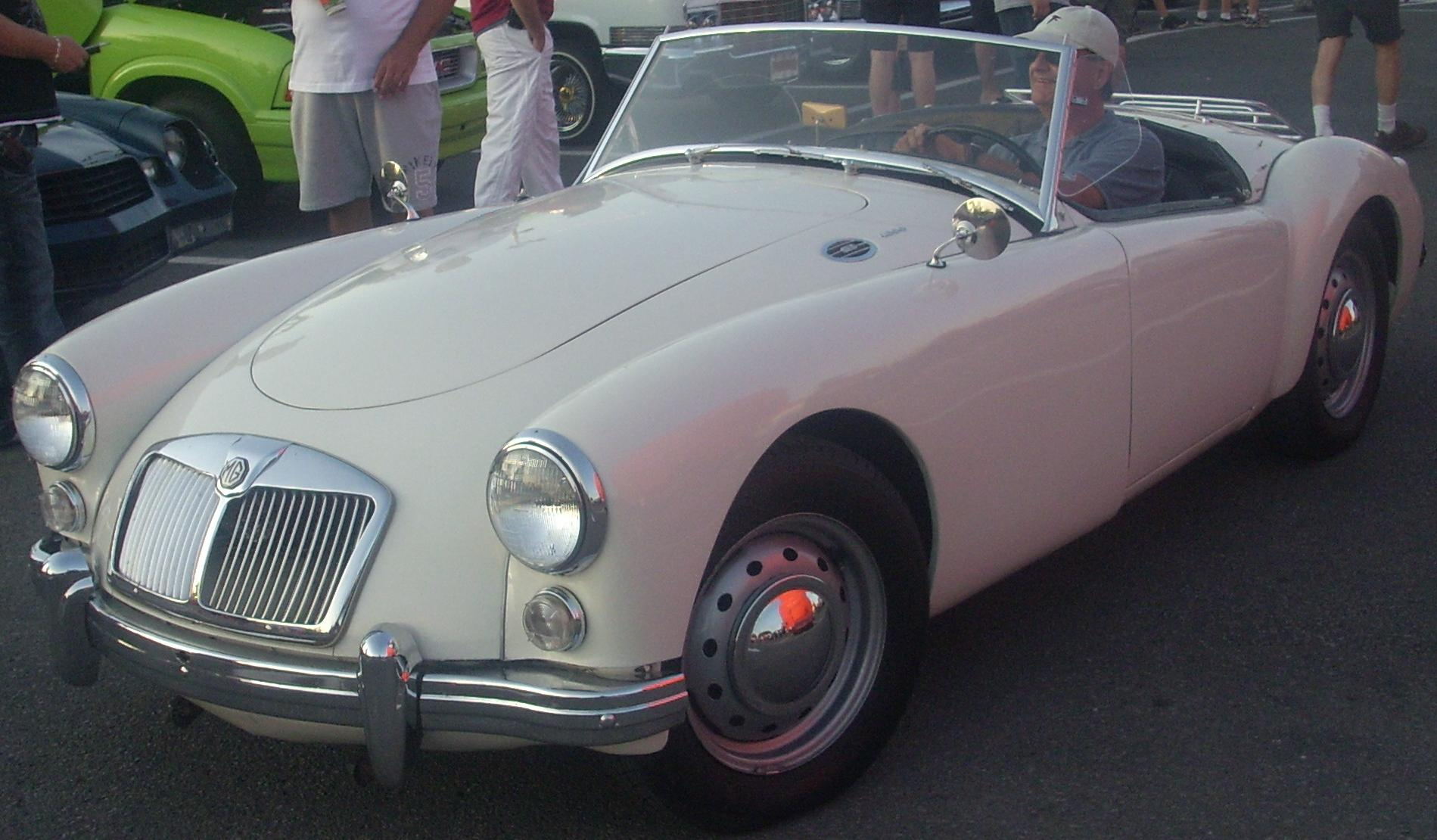
MG MGA with pressed steel wheels (North America)

== Twin-Cam ==
MG MGA Twin Cam
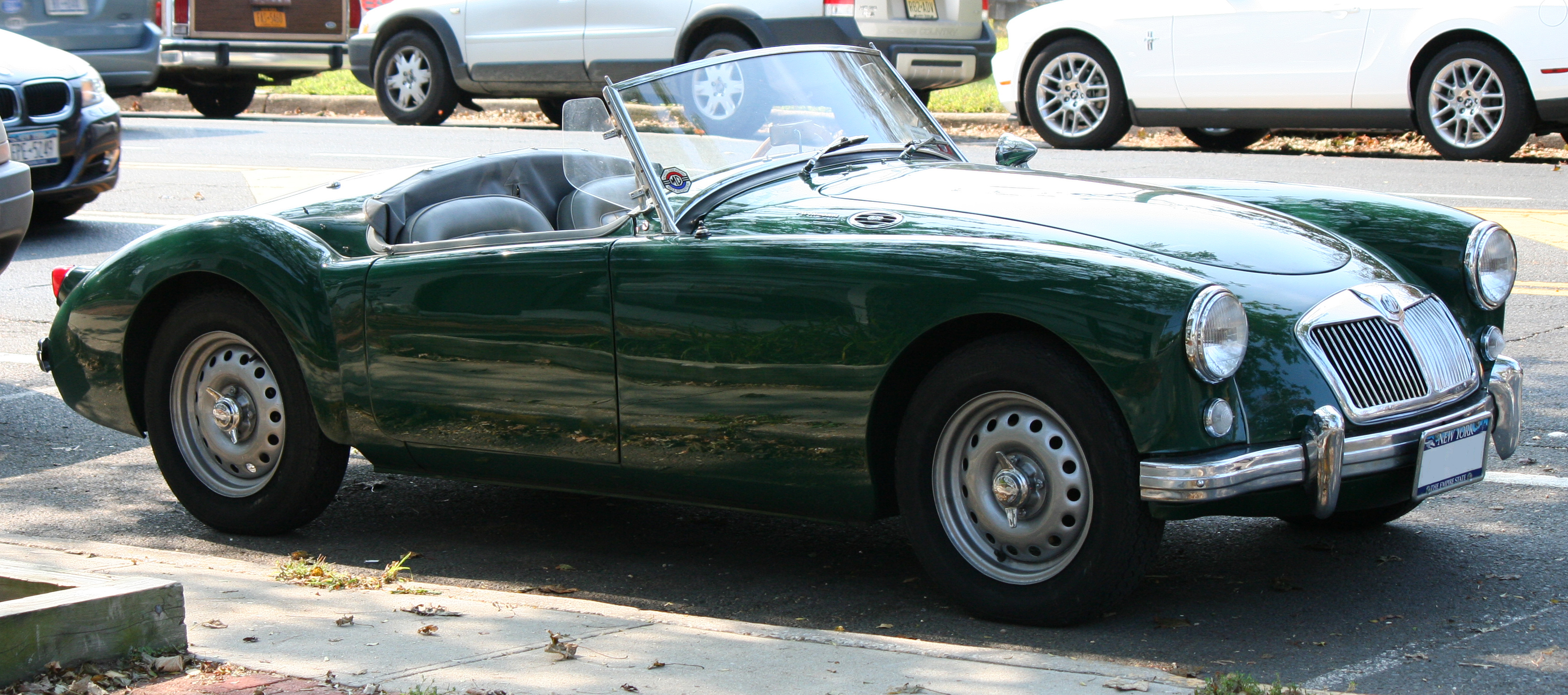

Overview
- Production: 1958–1960

Powertrain
- Engine: 1,588 cc (1.6 L) B-Series DOHC I4

A high-performance Twin-Cam model was added for 1958. It used a high-compression (9.9:1 later 8.3:1) DOHC aluminium cylinder head version of the B-Series engine producing 108 hp (81 kW; 109 PS). Four-wheel disc brakes by Dunlop were fitted, along with Dunlop peg drive knock-off steel wheels similar to wheels used on racing Jaguars, unique to the Twin-Cam and "DeLuxe" MGA 1600 and 1600 MkII roadsters. These wheels and chassis upgrades were used on a small number of the "DeLuxe" models built after Twin-Cam production came to a halt. Aside from the wheels, the only outside identifier was a "Twin-Cam" logo near the vent aside the bonnet.

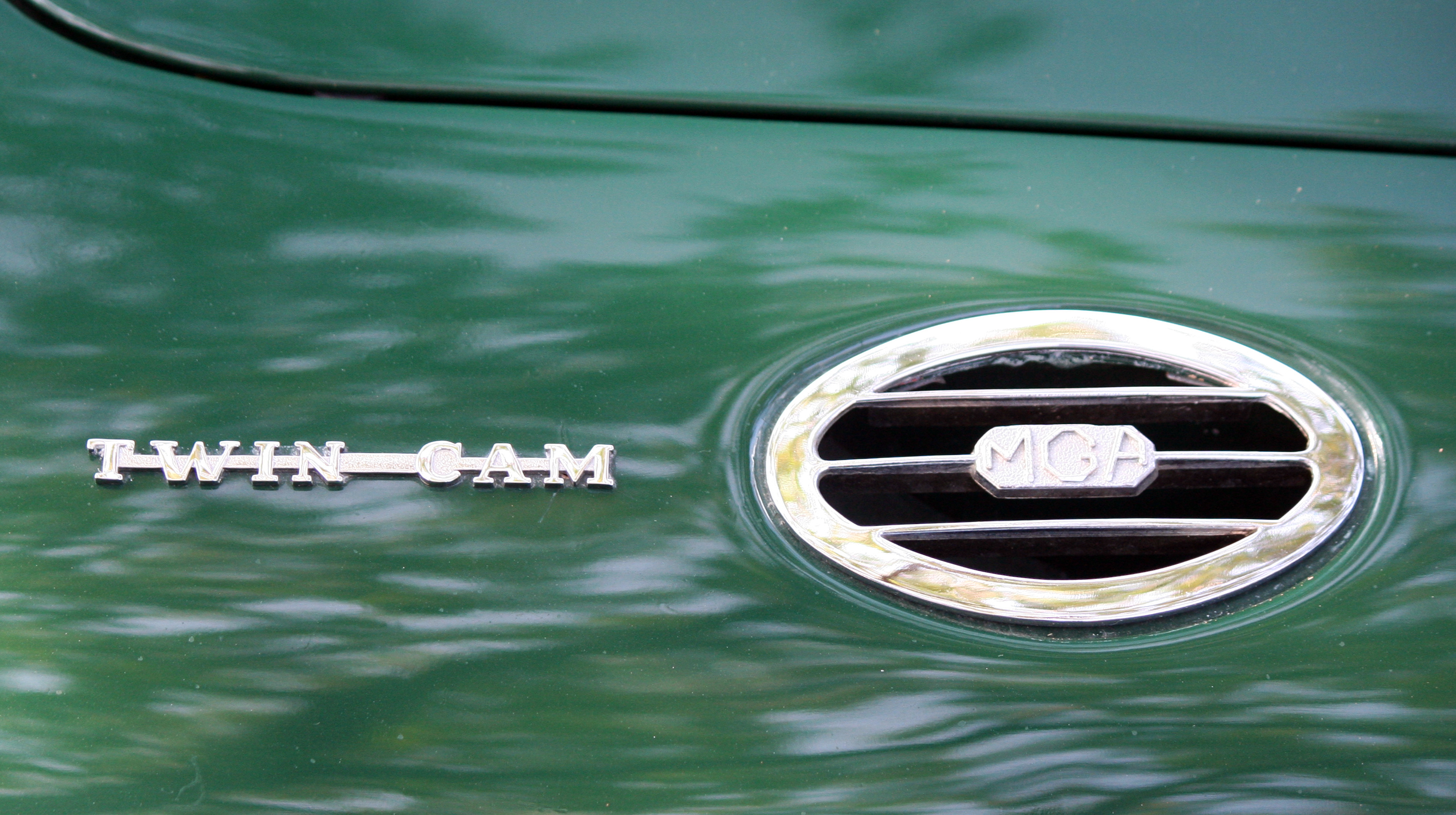
Twin-Cam logo next to vent

The temperamental engine was notorious for warranty problems during the course of production, and sales dropped quickly. The engine suffered from detonation and burnt oil. Most of the problems with the engine were rectified with the introduction of a 100 bhp (75 kW; 101 PS) low-compression version, but by then the reputation had been tarnished. The Twin-Cam was dropped in 1960 after 2,111 (2,210 according to some) had been produced. Production ended in April 1960, but had slowed to a trickle long before.

An open car was tested by The Motor magazine in 1958 and was found to have a top speed of 113 mph (182 km/h), acceleration from 0–60 mph (97 km/h) in 9.1 seconds and a fuel consumption of 27.6 miles per imperial gallon (10.2 L/100 km; 23.0 mpg_{‑US}) was recorded. The test car cost £1,283 including taxes of £428.

Oddly, an open MGA Twin Cam (index PMO 326), road tested by The Autocar magazine in its 18 July 1958 edition only recorded a 0-60 time of 13.3secs with the standing quarter mile of 18.6secs. The mean maximum speed was 113.5 mph, with a best of 114.0 mph.

== 1600 and 1600 De-Luxe ==
MG MGA 1600
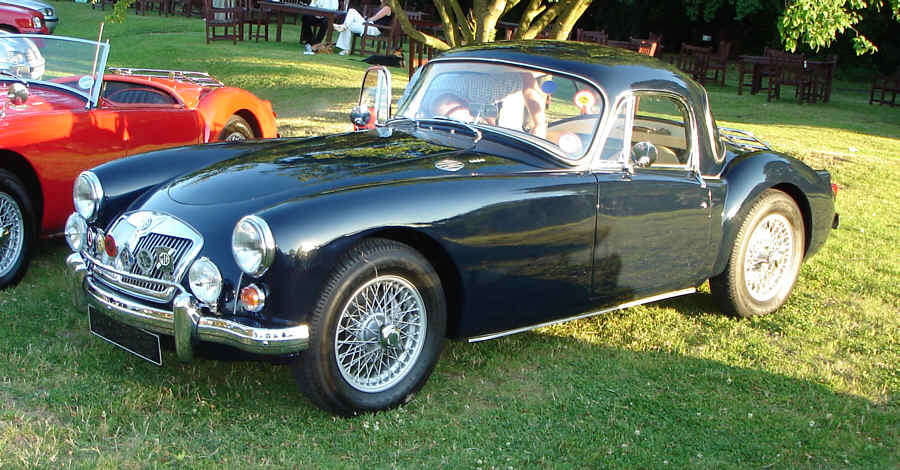

Overview
- Production: 1959–1960

Powertrain
- Engine: 1,588 cc (1.6 L) I4

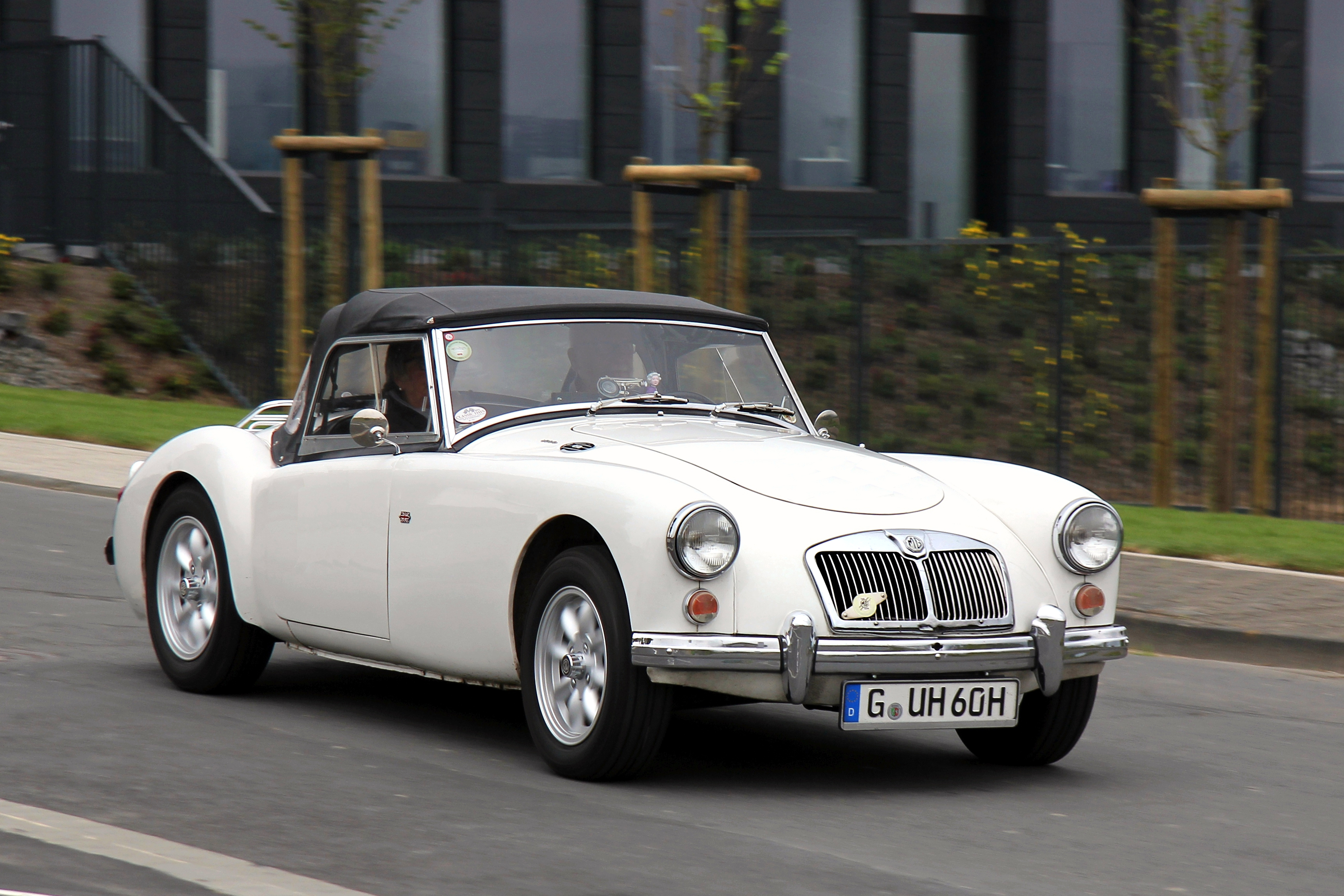
1960 MG A Mk I Roadster

In May 1959 the standard cars also received an updated engine, now at 1588 cc producing 79.5 bhp (59 kW; 81 PS) . At the front disc brakes were fitted, but drums remained in the rear.

31,501 were produced in less than three years.

Externally the car is very similar to the 1500 with differences including: amber or white (depending on market) front turn indicators shared with white parking lamps, separate stop/tail and turn lamps in the rear, and 1600 badging on the boot and the cowl.

A number of 1600 De Luxe versions were produced with leftover special wheels and four-wheel disc brakes of the departed Twin-Cam, or using complete modified Twin-cam chassis left redundant by the discontinuance of that model. Seventy roadsters and 12 coupés were built.

A 1600 open car was tested by The Motor in 1959. It had a top speed of 96.1 mph (154.7 km/h) and could accelerate from 0–60 mph (97 km/h) in 13.3 seconds. A fuel consumption of 29.7 miles per imperial gallon (9.5 L/100 km; 24.7 mpg_{‑US}) was recorded. The test car cost £940 including taxes of £277.

== Mark II and Mark II De-Luxe ==
MG MGA 1600 Mark II
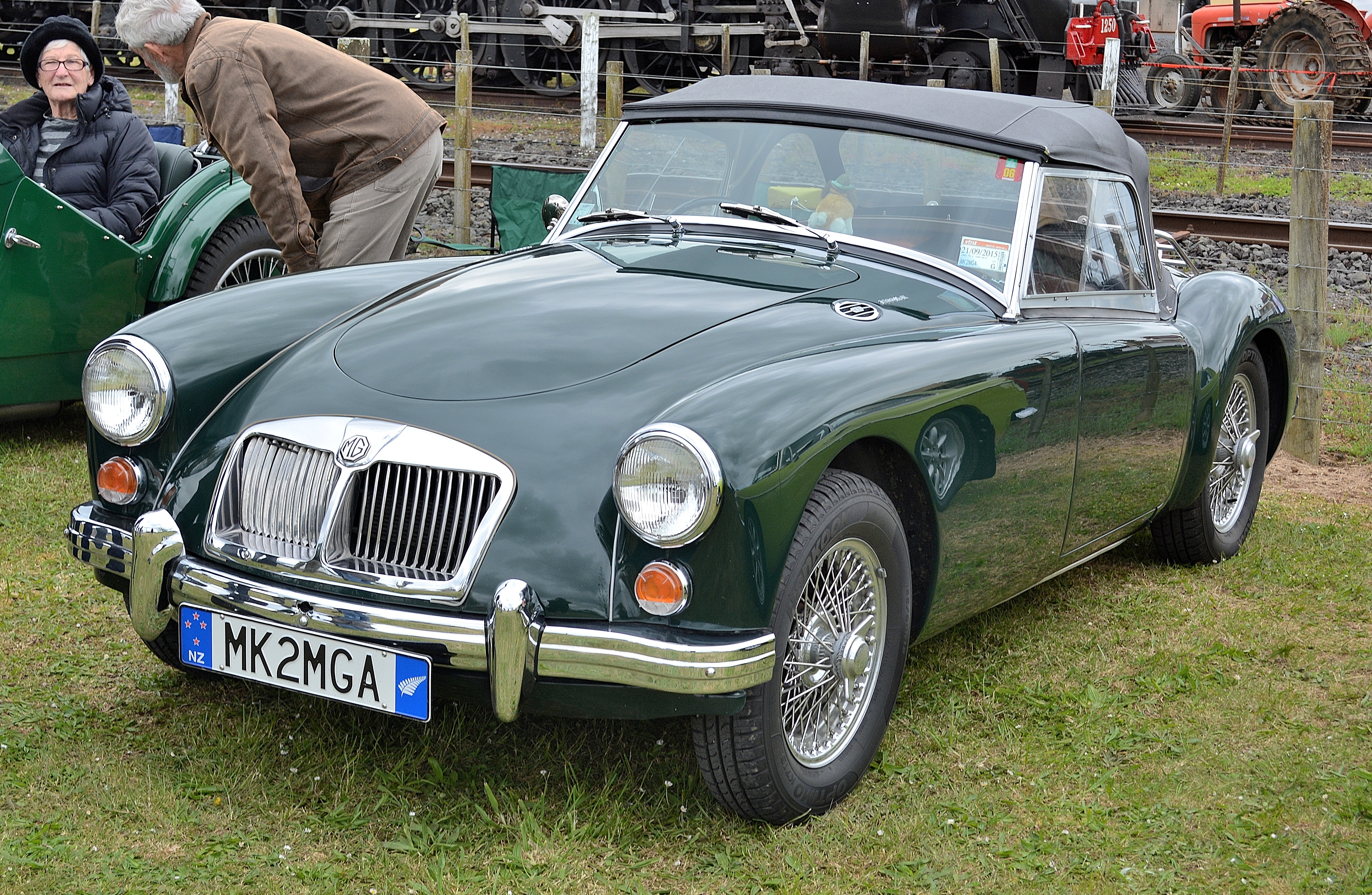

Overview
- Production: 1960–1962

Powertrain
- Engine: 1,622 cc (1.6 L) I4

The engine size was increased again to 1622 cc by increasing the bore from 75.4 mm (2.97 in) to 76.2 mm (3.00 in) for the 1961 Mark II MGA. The cylinder head was also revised with larger valves and re-engineered combustion chambers. Horsepower increased to 90 bhp. It also had a higher ratio 4:1 rear axle, which made for more relaxed high-speed driving. An inset grille and Morris Mini tail lamps appearing horizontally below the deck lid were the most obvious visual changes. 8,198 Mark II roadsters and 521 coupés were built.

Road & Track magazine reviewed the MG A 1600 Mark II in the September 1961 issue and reported an estimated top speed of 105 mph and a 0-60 mph acceleration of 12.8 seconds.

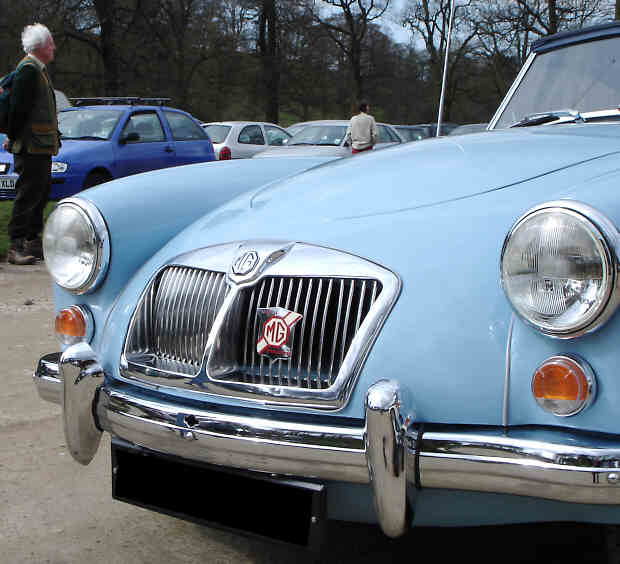
The inset grille fitted to the 1600 Mark II

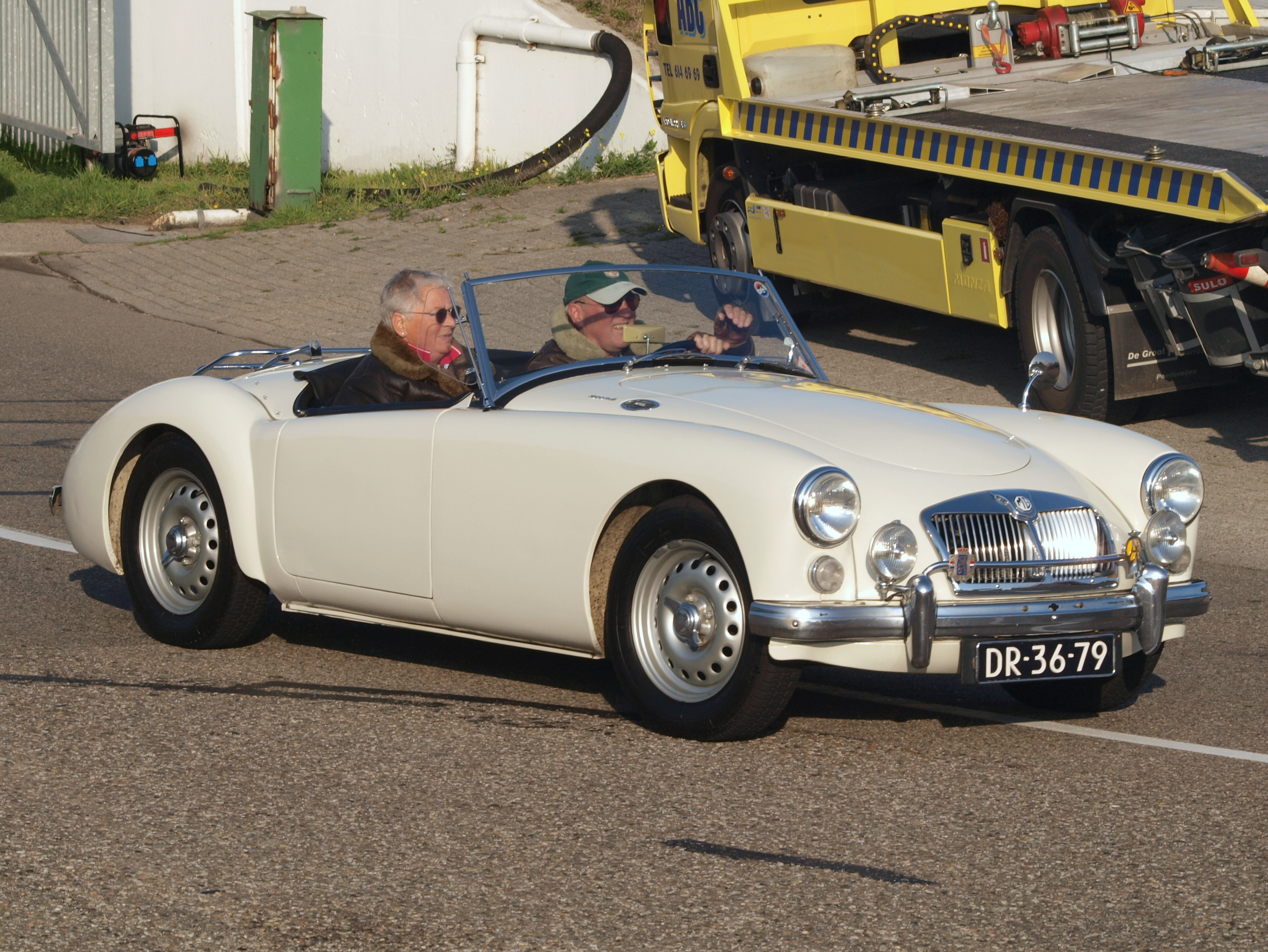
1600 Mark II DeLuxe Roadster, with knock-off steel wheels

As with the 1600 De Luxe, there were also some Mark II De Luxe versions; 290 roadsters and 23 coupés were produced.

== Competition history ==
The MGA's bodywork was based largely on that of a one-off MG TD specially built by the MG factory at the request of racing privateer George Phillips for the 1951 24 Hours of Le Mans. Later, a new chassis was designed so as to seat the driver lower in the car with even cleaner bodywork resulting in the EX 175 prototype.

The later MG prototype EX 182 was very close to the final production MGA and was the car actually raced at Le Mans in 1955. Three MGA prototypes were entered in the 1955 24 Hours of Le Mans. Two of the cars finished the race placing 12th and 17th overall, proving the worth of the new car. The third car crashed with serious injuries to the driver, Dick Jacobs.

The MGA has been raced extensively in the U.S. since its 1955 introduction and with considerable success. In Sports Car Club of America competition the MGA has won numerous regional and national championships. It has also been a favourite choice of those competing in vintage racing. Kent Prather has been the most successful American MGA driver to date with G Production wins at the SCCA national championships in 1986, 1990, 1995, 2002, 2003, and 2005. Prather and his MGA accomplished this despite the fact that his MGA was often the oldest vehicle competing among several hundred race cars at the SCCA Runoffs.

In the United States, the MGA was used in NASCAR from 1960 to 1963 in the Grand National Series, failing to win a single race. After production ended of the MGA, MG (which at that point was the last foreign automaker in NASCAR) decided not to field another entry in the circuit, which resulted in a de facto oligopoly of the NASCAR circuit by Detroit's Big Three. Aside from a brief period in the 1970s when American Motors fielded the AMC Matador in NASCAR competition, not another non-Detroit automaker—let alone a non-American automaker—would enter NASCAR until 2007, when Toyota entered NASCAR competition with the Camry.
