= Austin Freeway =

Australian car model

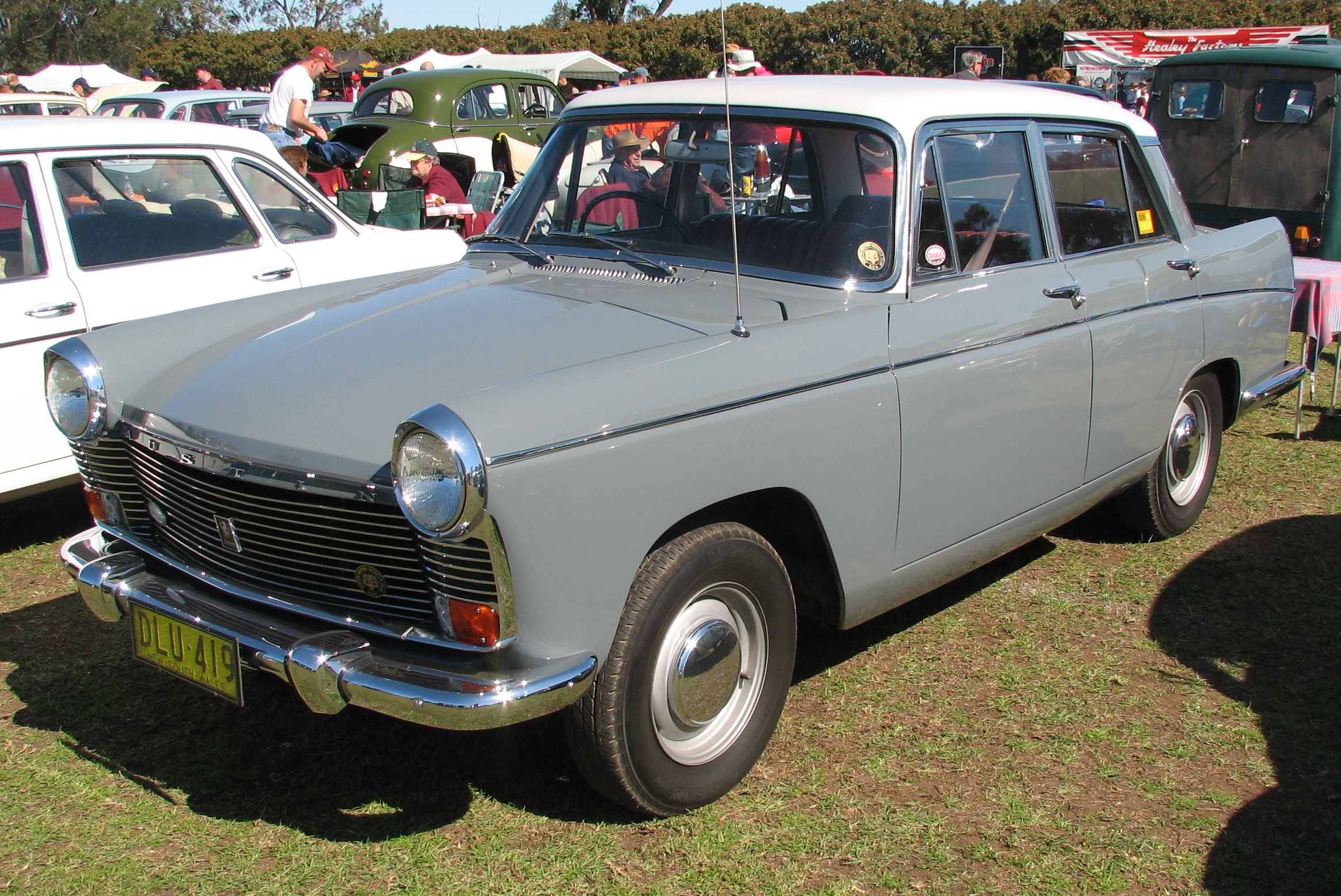
- Austin Freeway Sedan

Overview
- Manufacturer: BMC Australia
- Also called: Morris Freeway (New Zealand)
- Production: 1962–1965
- Assembly: Australia

Body and chassis
- Body style: 4-door sedan 5-door station wagon
- Layout: FR
- Related: Austin A60 Cambridge; Wolseley 24/80

Powertrain
- Engine: 2,433 cc I6
- Transmission: 3-speed manual 3-speed automatic

Chronology
- Successor: Austin 1800 (ADO17)

The Austin Freeway is an automobile which was developed by BMC Australia, based on the British Austin A60 Cambridge. Introduced in 1962, it was marketed under the Austin name in both four-door sedan and five-door station wagon body styles.

Using the locally built 2433 cc six-cylinder "Blue Streak" engine, it represented the first attempt by BMC to challenge the dominant Holden and Ford Falcon models in the lucrative six-cylinder family car class with a locally developed vehicle. The engine was a direct development of the company's 1622cc B-series unit, cylinder dimensions in the six-cylinder unit being identical to those of its four-cylinder counterpart.

An upmarket variant, the Wolseley 24/80 sedan was also offered.

Although more expensive than its opposition, the Freeway was well equipped by contemporary standards, offering features such as windscreen washers and a fresh air heater/demister. The sedan combined a new full-width grille with the rear-end styling of the British MG Magnette and Riley 4 models. The station wagon utilised the Austin A60 Cambridge rear-end styling. 3,090 units were sold in its first year but volumes fell well short of those of its Holden and Ford Falcon rivals and of the much more powerful six-cylinder Chrysler Valiant, introduced in Australia earlier the same year.

The original Freeway (designated ADO40) was replaced by the Freeway Mk II (YDO3) in October 1964. The revised model featured a more powerful engine, power brakes, improved rear suspension and improved seating.

Declining sales saw the Freeway discontinued in 1965 with production ceasing in September of that year after approximately 27,000 cars had been built. The Freeway was replaced by the Austin 1800 with Australian production commencing in 1966.

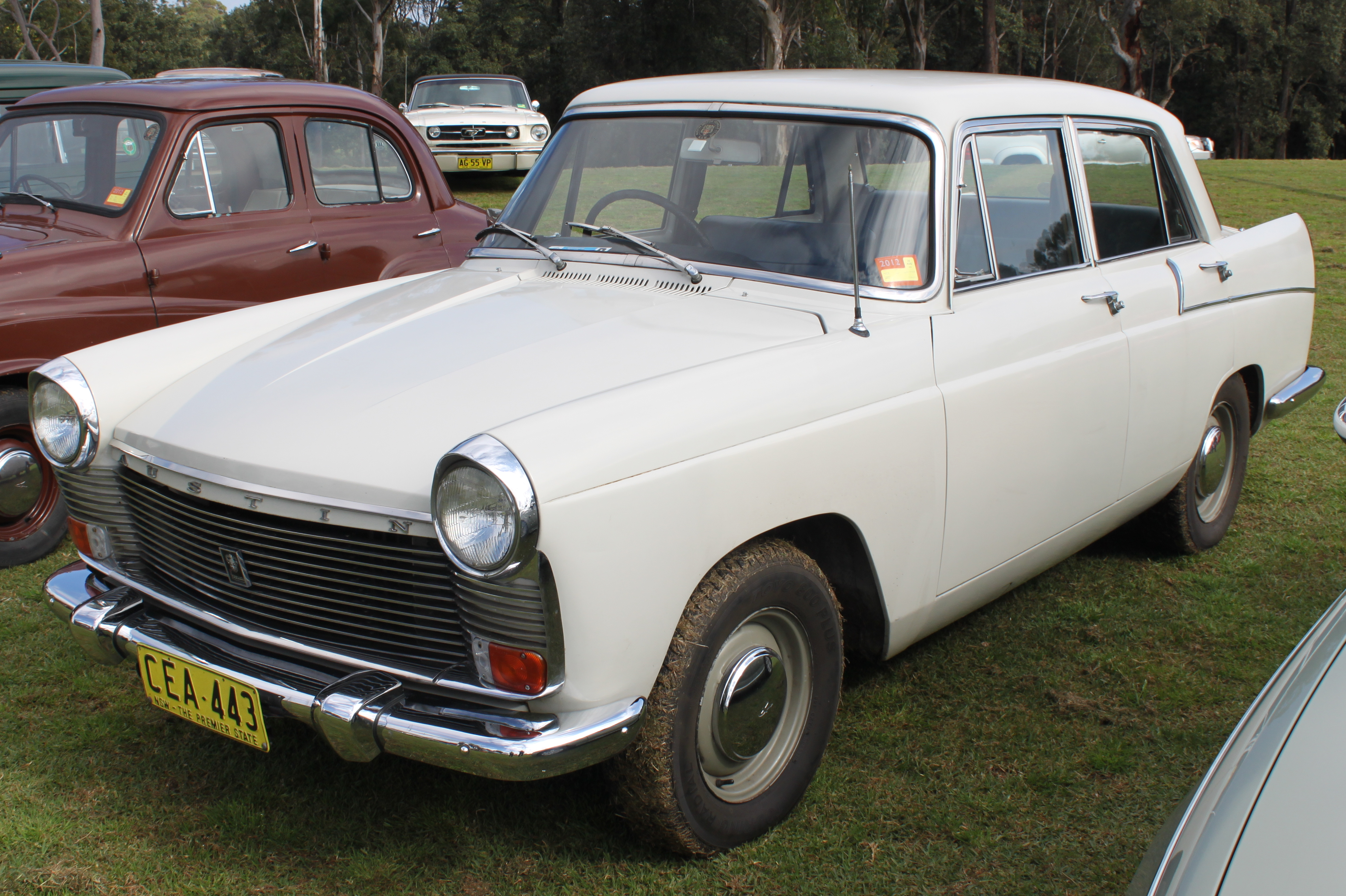
Austin Freeway Sedan

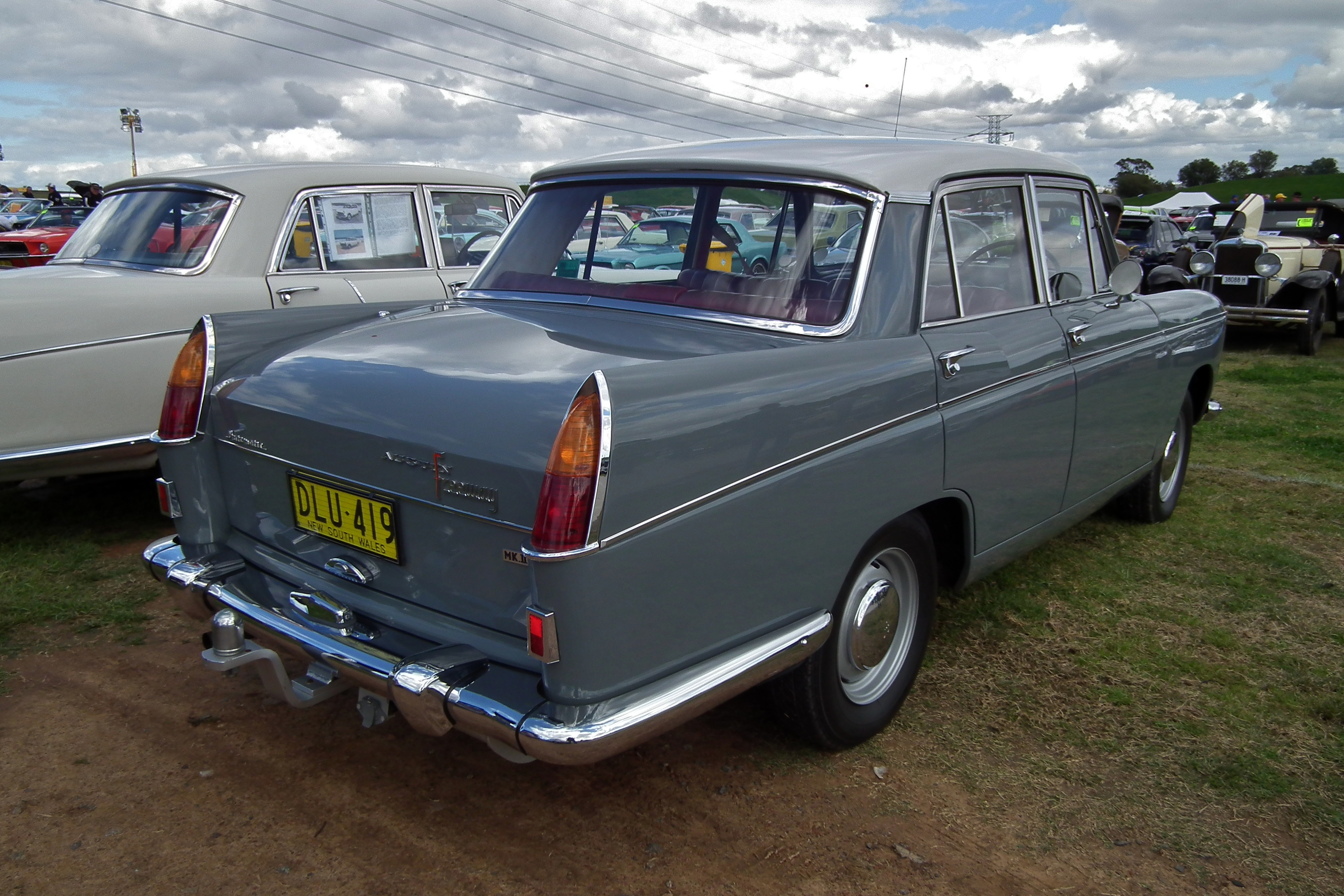
Austin Freeway Mk II Sedan

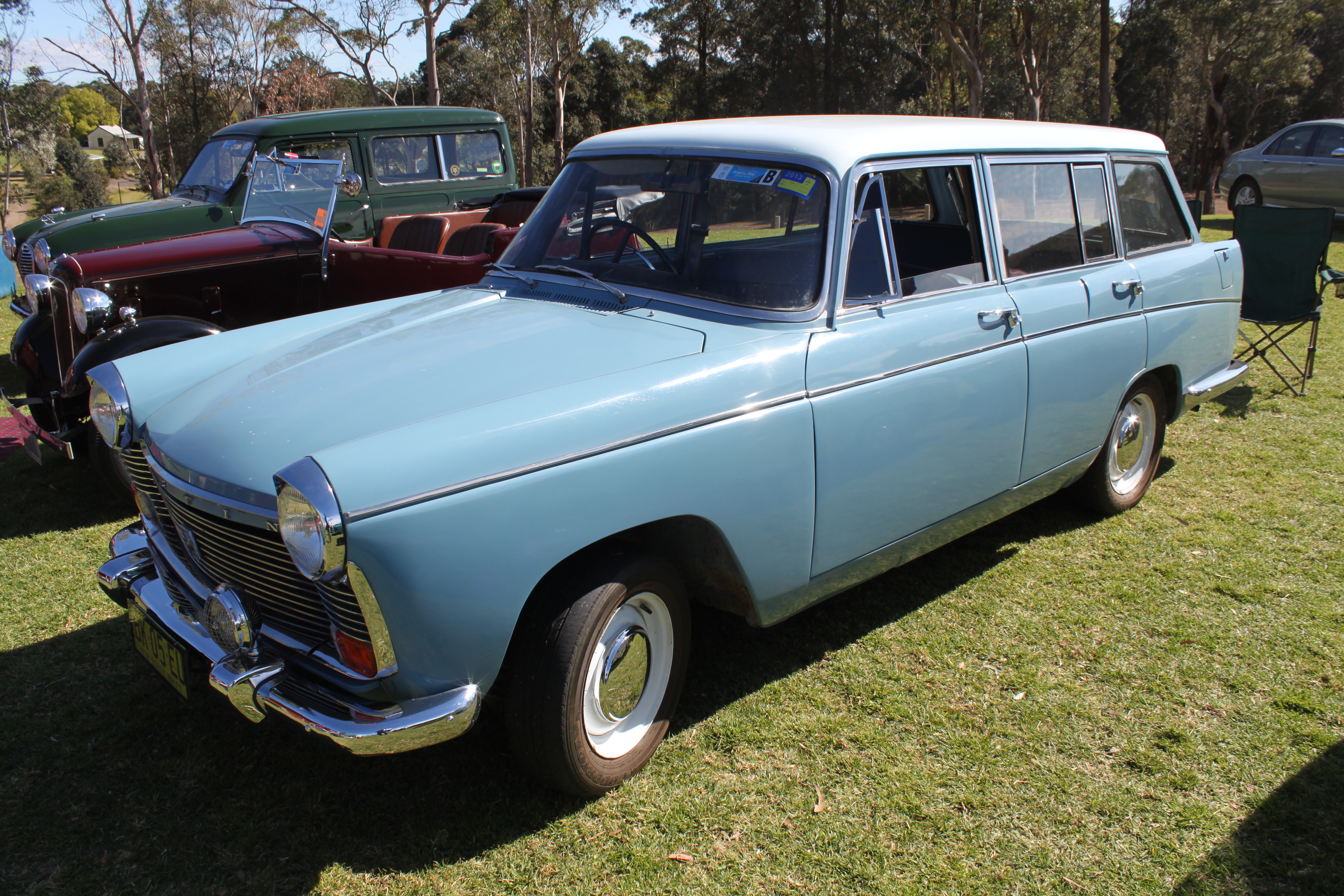
Austin Freeway Station Wagon

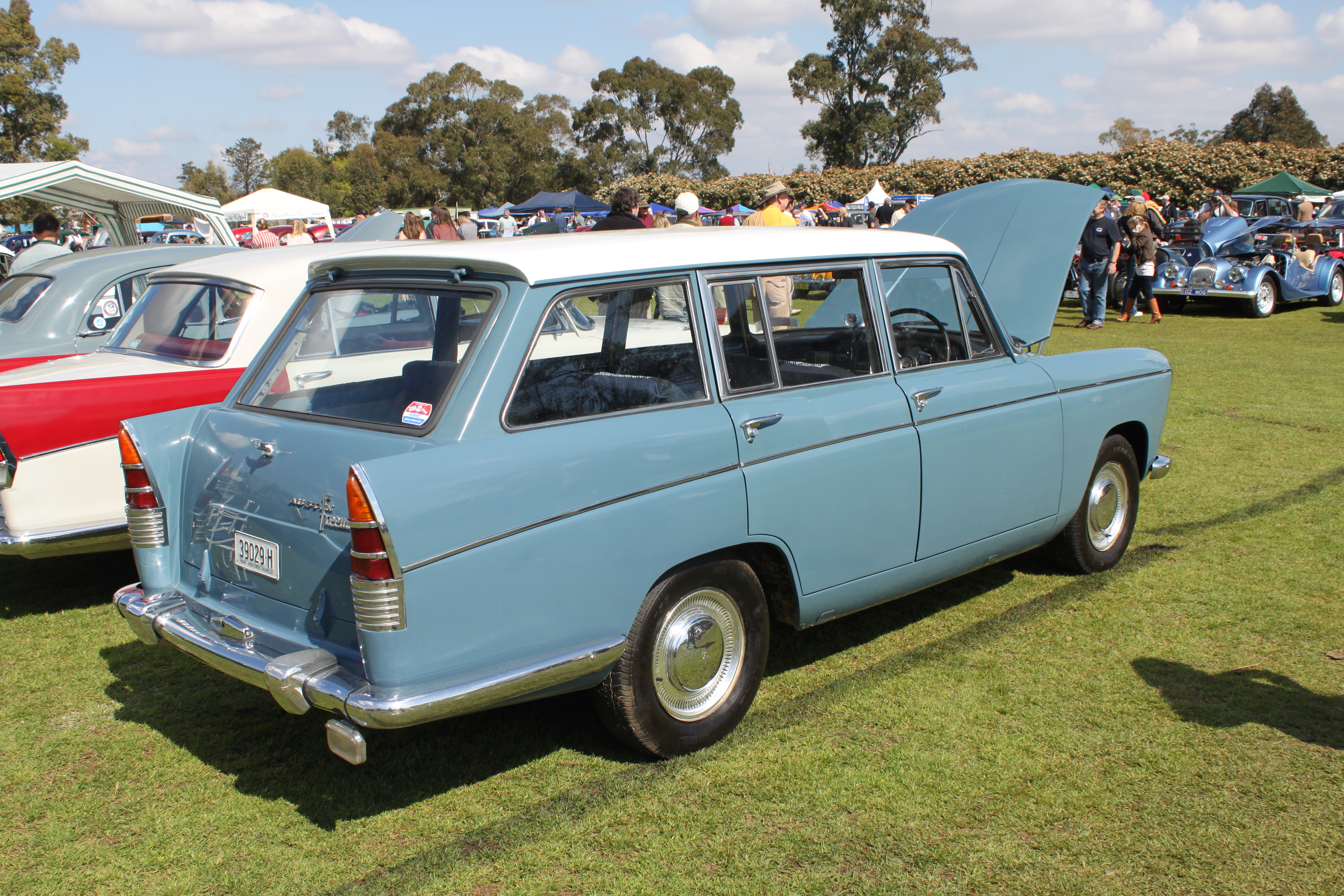
Austin Freeway Station Wagon

== New Zealand market ==
The Freeway was marketed in New Zealand as both the Austin Freeway and the Morris Freeway, allowing the separate Austin and Morris dealerships in that country to sell the model.

The Freeway name was subsequently used on the New Zealand market for the BMC ADO17, (with the BMC brand instead of Austin or Morris this time around).

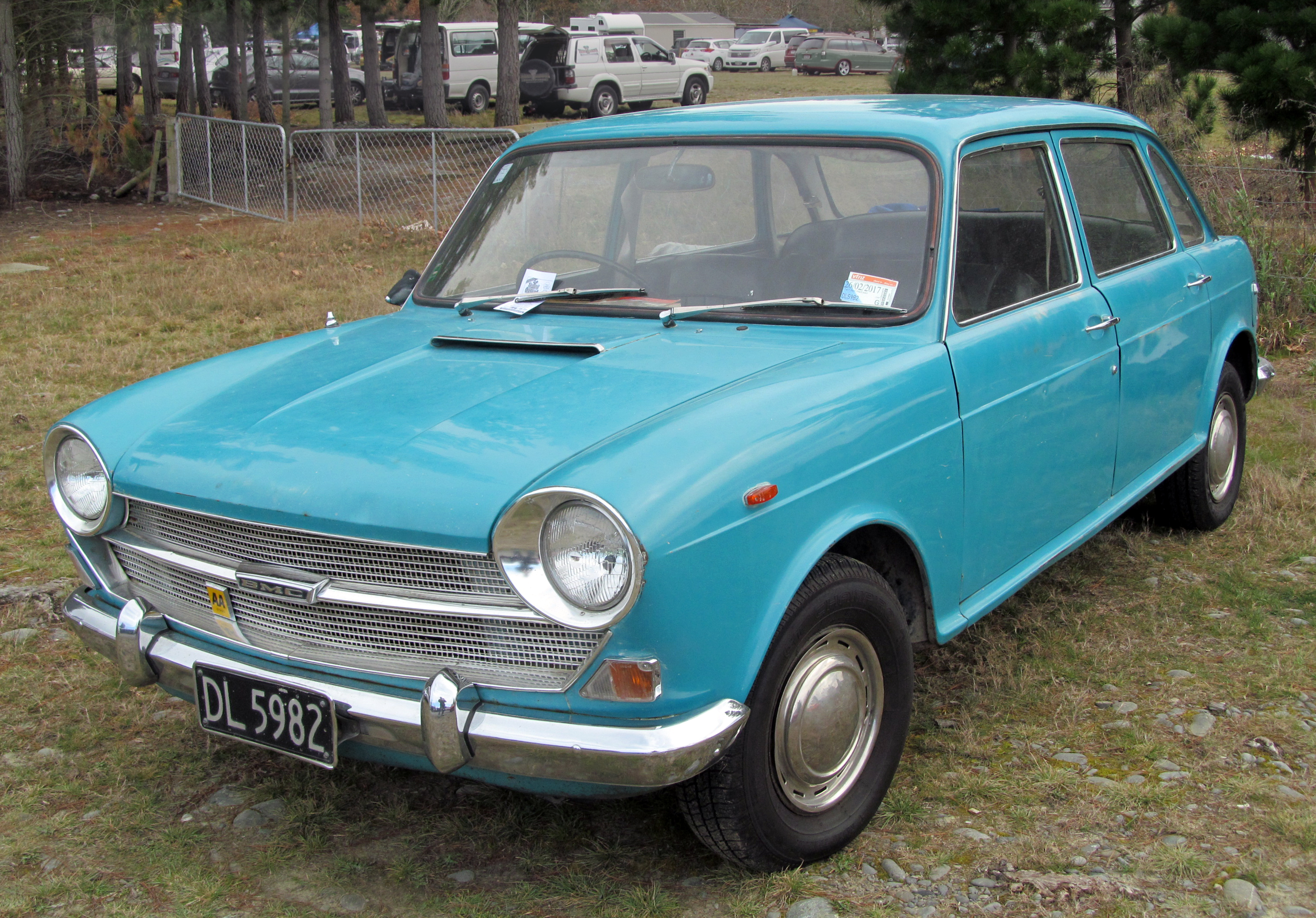
1967 BMC Freeway

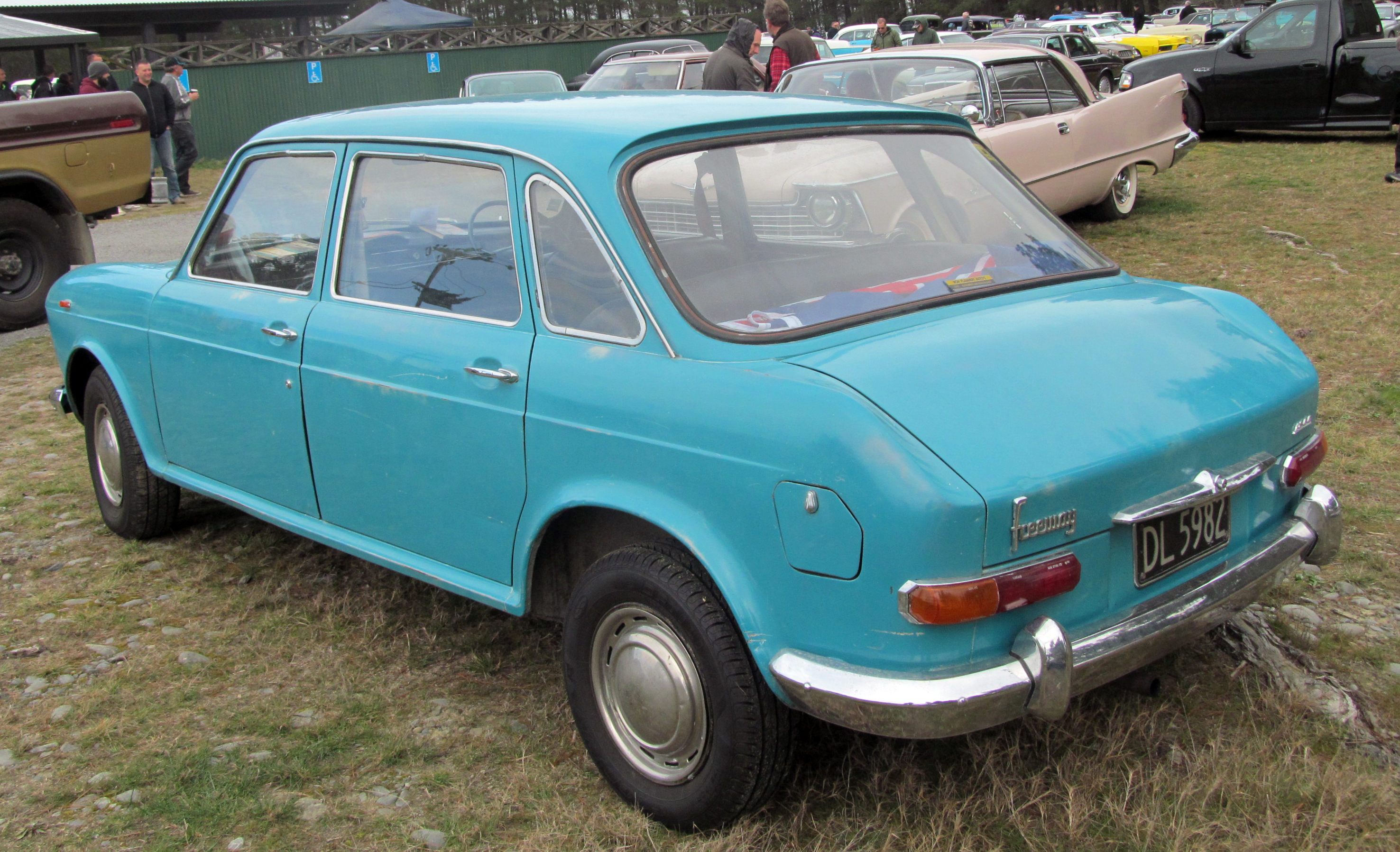
1967 BMC Freeway
