= Wolseley 24/80 =

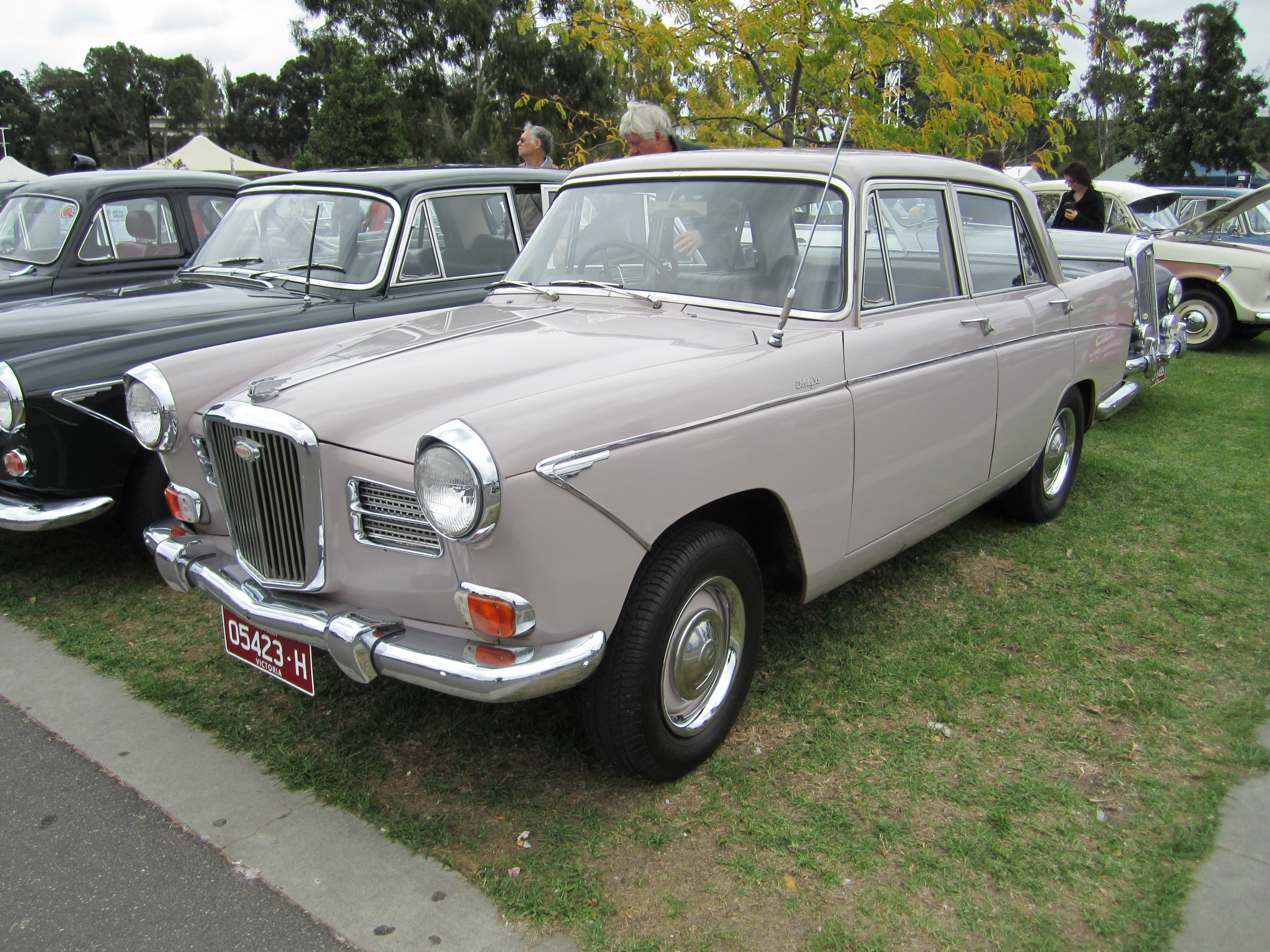

Overview
- Manufacturer: BMC Australia
- Production: 1962–1965

Body and chassis
- Body style: 4-door sedan
- Related: Austin Freeway; Wolseley 15/60; Wolseley 16/60

Powertrain
- Engine: 2.4 L I6

Chronology
- Predecessor: Wolseley 15/60 (in Australian markets)
- Successor: None

The Wolseley 24/80 is an automobile produced by British Motor Corporation (Australia) from May 1962 to October 1965, based on the British four-cylinder Wolseley 15/60 model.

It was externally identical to the Wolseley 15/60. The car was also an up-market version of the contemporary Austin Freeway, employing different frontal and rear styling in order to maximise the perceived differences between the two cars and therefore, it was hoped, attract additional buyers away from the General Motors-Holden competition. This reflected BMC's policy of badge engineering in the 1950s and 1960s.

== Specifications ==
- Power was by a six-cylinder version of the 1,622 cc (99.0 cu in) B-series engine, known as the "Blue Streak" straight-six engine with a capacity of 2,433 cc (148.5 cu in) and developing 80 bhp (60 kW; 81 PS) at 4,350 rpm.
- A three-speed manual gearbox was installed, adapted from the Nash Metropolitan, with synchromesh on the upper two ratios and a steering column gear change. The 15/60 had a four speed manual gearbox with a floor-change.
- Later, a Borg Warner 35 three-speed automatic transmission was offered as an option.
- The rear axle ratio was raised from 4.55 to 1 in the 15/60 to 3.91 to 1 in the 24/80.
- To accommodate the longer engine, the radiator was moved forward to a position in front of the bonnet-locking bar. In the 15/60, it was behind the bonnet-locking bar.
- Compared to the 15/60 the wheelbase was 1" longer, and the track was increased 2" in the front and 1.5" in the rear.
- With the exception of the steering column gear change, the interior was the same as in the 15/60.

== Wolseley 24/80 Mark II ==
The Mark II model was released in July 1964 with identical styling to the British Wolseley 16/60. Updates to the 24/80 Mark I specification were:

- Power was increased from 80 bhp (60 kW; 81 PS) at 4,350 rpm to 85 bhp (63 kW; 86 PS) at 4,400 rpm.
- A vacuum operated PBR power brake servo was fitted.
- Many minor mechanical improvements were adopted.
- The rear fins were lower compared to the by now dated Mark I rear fins.
- The interior trim was now in soft expanded vinyl rather than the leather used in the original model.

== End of production ==
Production of the Mark II was discontinued in October 1965, although unsold stocks lasted until late 1966. The 24/80 Mark II became the last Wolseley model to be assembled in Australia. The factory changed over to production of the Austin 1800.

The last Wolseleys to be exhibited at the Melbourne Motor Show were two 24/80 Mark IIs along with a fully imported Wolseley 6/110 in February 1966. No Wolseleys were exhibited the following year. The Wolseley 6/110 was the last Wolseley to be sold new in Australia. The last being first registered in 1968.

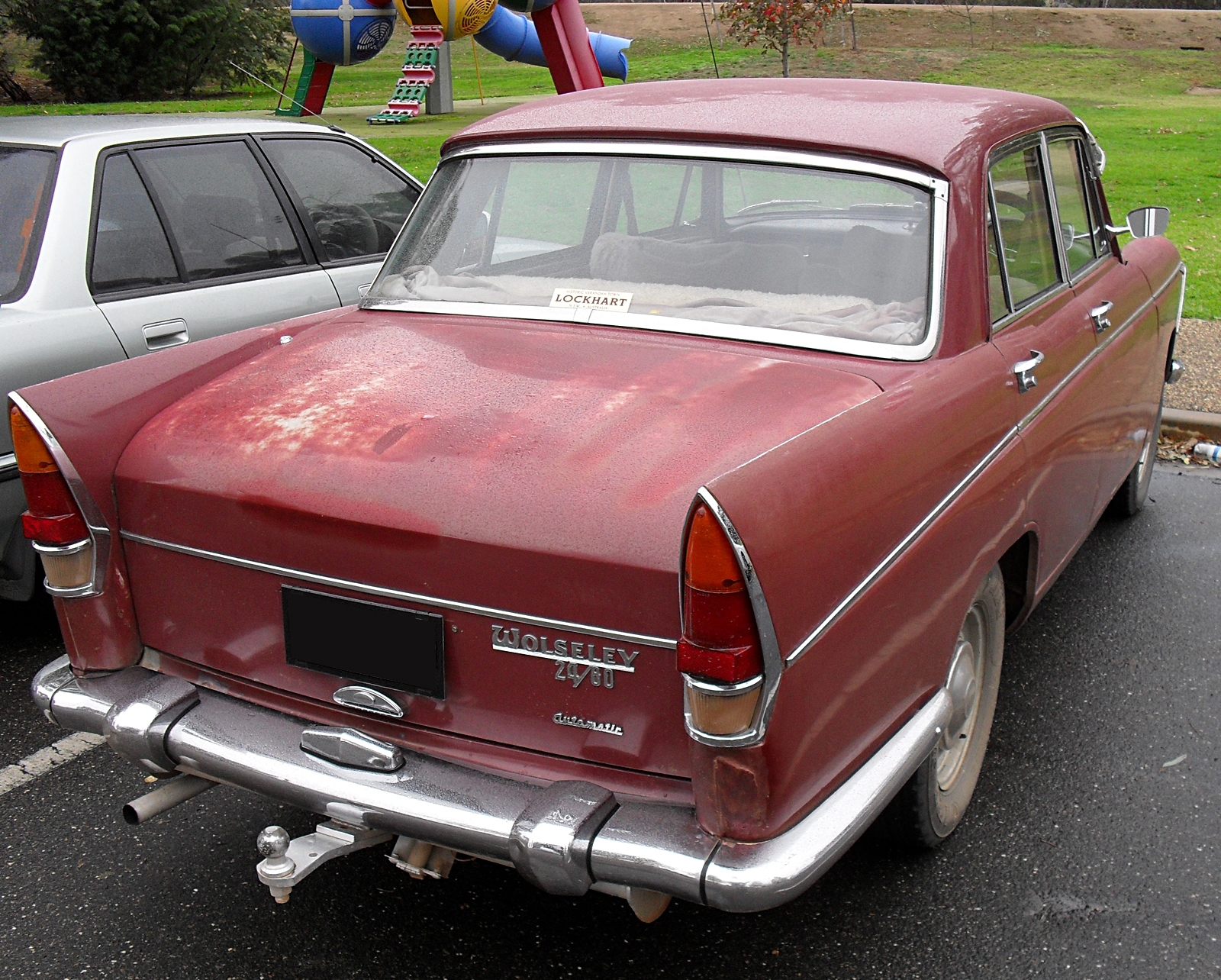
Wolseley 24/80 "Mark 1"

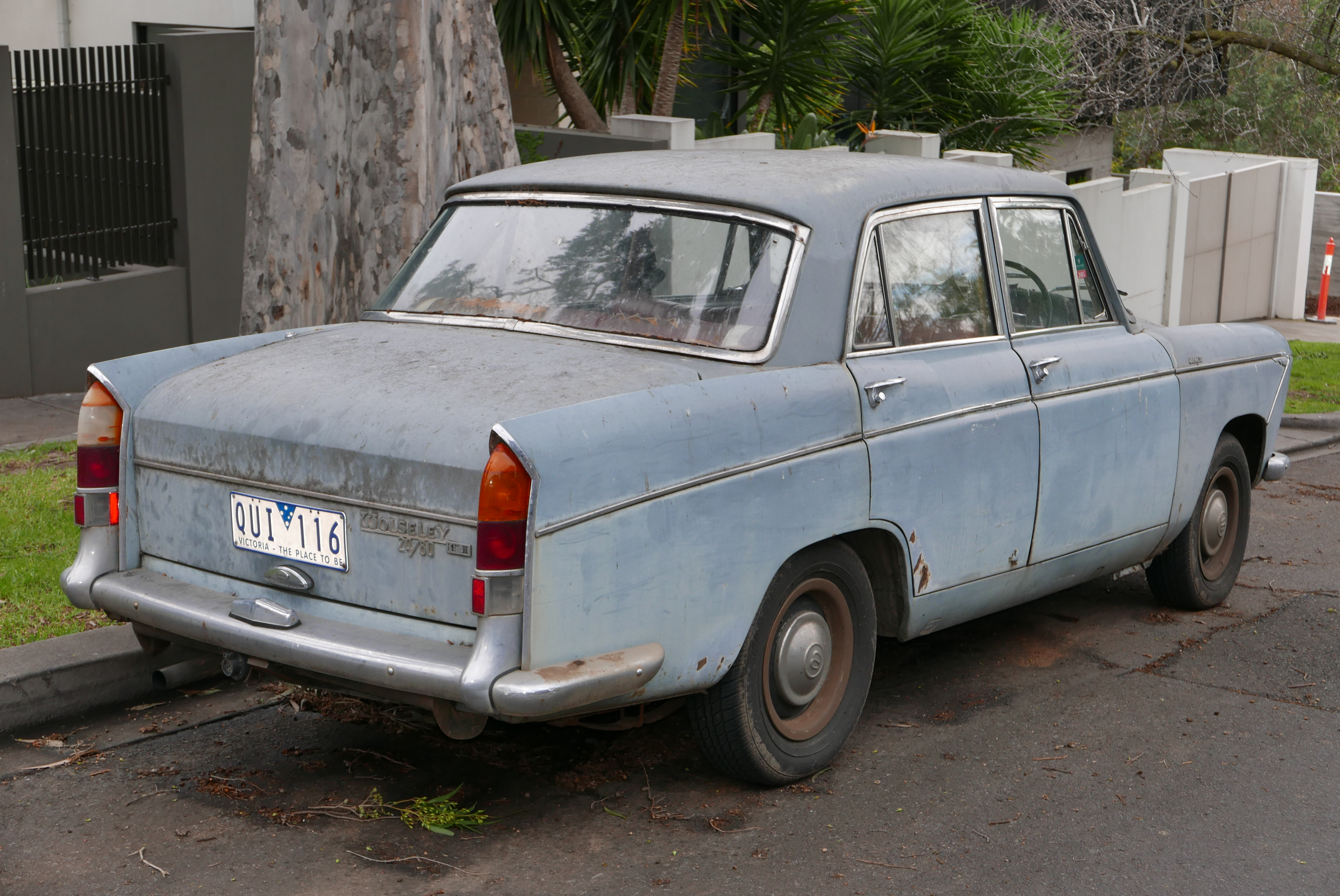
The Mark II of 1964–65 featured smaller tail fins than those of the original "Mark I"
