= Morris Oxford Farina =

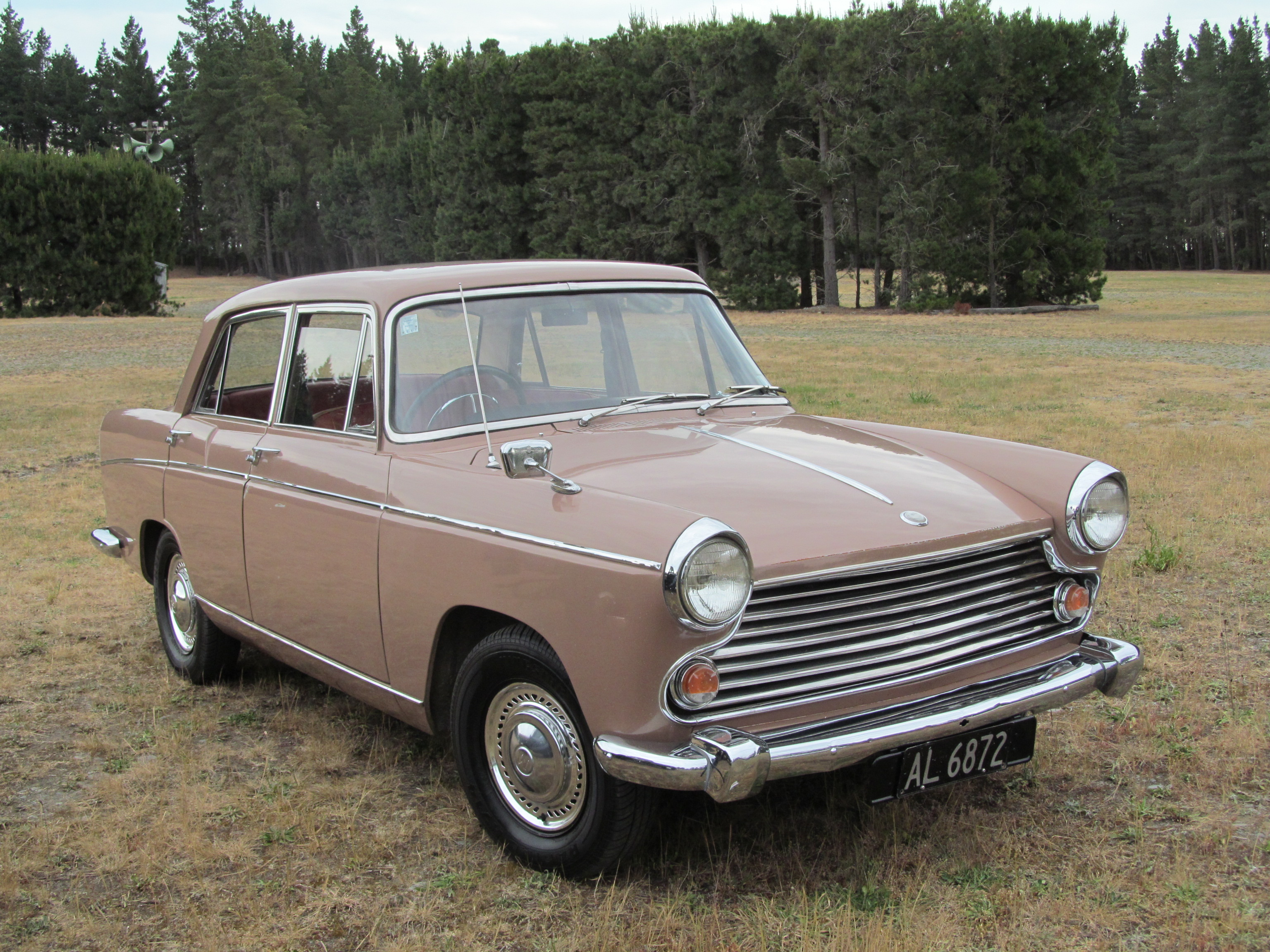
- Oxford Series VI Saloon 1963

Overview
- Manufacturer: Morris (British Motor Corporation, later British Leyland)
- Production: 1959–1971
- Designer: Pinin Farina

Body and chassis
- Class: Family car

The Morris Oxford Farina is a series of motor car models that were produced by Morris of the United Kingdom from 1959 to 1971. The Farina name coming from the Italian design studio employed for styling.

Named by William Morris after the university town in which he grew up, the manufacture of Morris's Oxford cars had helped to turn the south-side of Oxford into a thriving industrial area.

Like its predecessors, the Morris Oxford for the 1960s was a four-cylinder mid-size family car. The Oxford Farina competed with cars such as the badge-engineered A55/A60 Austin Cambridge, the Singer Gazelle, the Vauxhall Victor, and the Ford Cortina.

== Oxford Series V (1959–1961) ==
Oxford Series V
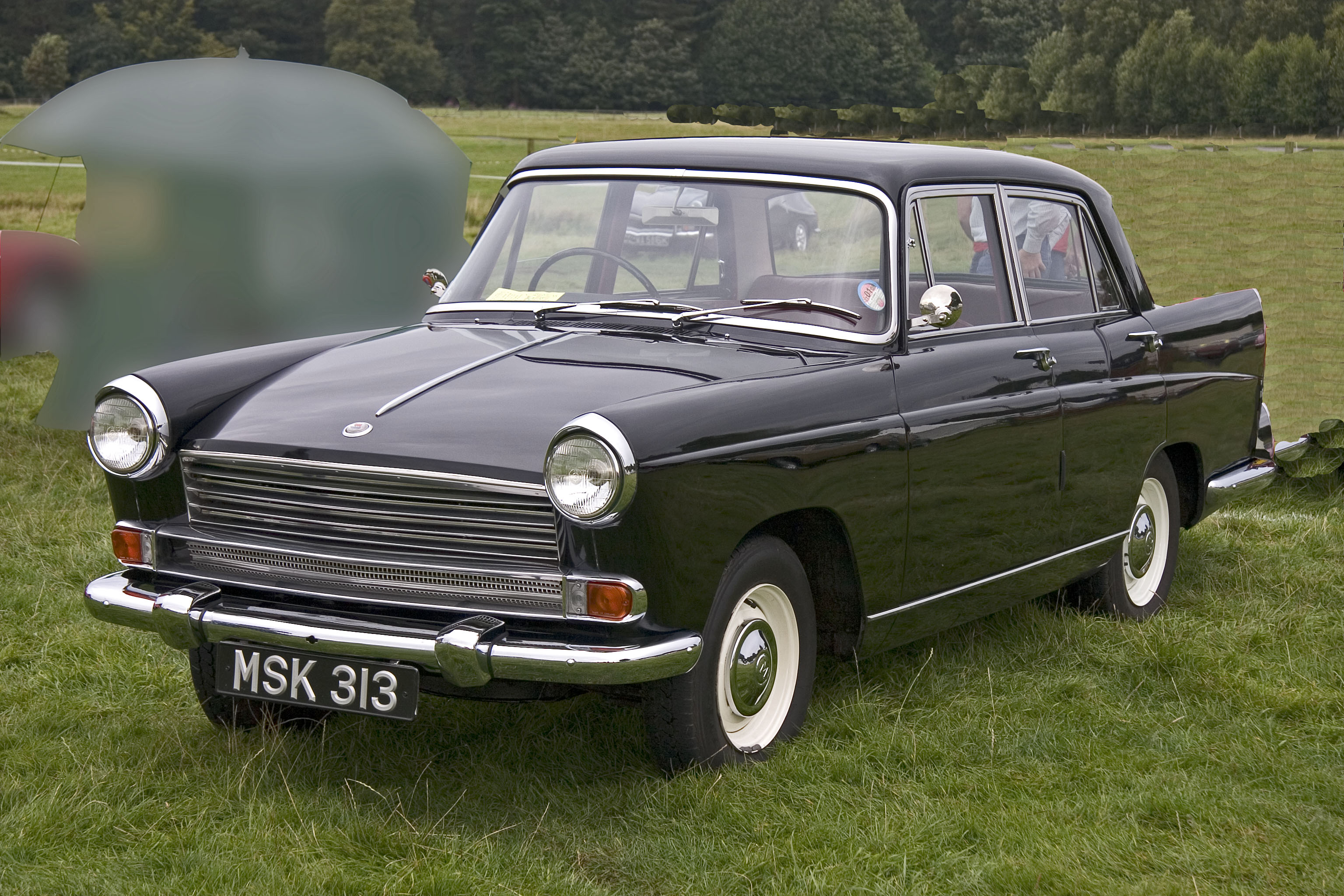
- Oxford Series V

Overview
- Production: 1959–1961; 87,432 produced
- Assembly: United Kingdom; Australia

Body and chassis
- Body style: 4-door saloon 4-door estate
- Related: Austin A55 Cambridge; Riley 4/68; MG Magnette III; Wolseley 15/60

Powertrain
- Engine: 1489 cc BMC B-Series engine I4

Dimensions
- Wheelbase: 99 in (2,500 mm); 108 in (2,700 mm)
- Length: 175.5 in (4,460 mm)
- Width: 63.5 in (1,610 mm)

Chronology
- Predecessor: Morris Oxford Series III
- Successor: Morris Oxford Series VI

For 1959, the Oxford, announced on Lady Day 25 March 1959, was merged into the mid-sized Pinin Farina-designed BMC Farina range along with a half-dozen other previously announced models, including the 1958 Wolseley 15/60 and 1959 Riley 4/68, Austin A55 Cambridge Mark II, and MG Magnette Mark III. The Austin and Morris cars were nearly identical but were produced in separate factories. Differences in the Morris included some of the chrome and interior trim, and the rear lights. Inside, a front bench seat and special dashboard fitted with speedometer, oil pressure gauge, coolant temperature gauge, fuel gauge and clock (optional) were used. A choice of floor or column gear change was available. The handbrake was floor-mounted to the side of the seat. The 1.5 L B-Series engine continued. Drum brakes of 9 in (230 mm) diameter were fitted front and rear and the steering used a cam and peg system. The suspension was independent at the front using coil springs and had a live axle and semi-elliptic leaf springs at the rear.

=== Traveller ===
The Series IV Traveller was still listed till September 1960, by which time a Series V Traveller had been introduced.

Tested by The Motor magazine the car had a top speed of 78 mph (126 km/h) and could accelerate from 0–60 mph (97 km/h) in 25.4 seconds. A "touring" fuel consumption of 29.8 miles per imperial gallon (9.5 L/100 km; 24.8 mpg_{‑US}) was recorded.

Both standard and de-luxe versions were offered. The de-luxe package included a heater, manual screen washer, twin sun visors, twin horns, bumper over-riders, a clock and leather-covered seat. A two-tone paint scheme and a radio were available as options.

On the home market the Standard version cost £815 and the de-luxe £844 including taxes.

A Traveller estate car version of the Series V Farina body was announced 28 September 1960. The new body now provided a double bed size sleeping compartment about 6 ft long and 4 ft wide. The back of the car had a tail-board hinged at the bottom and an upper panel hinged at the top. The Morris version had a single bench front seat and cost £10 more than the equivalent Austin Countryman.

In all, 87,432 Series V Oxfords were built.

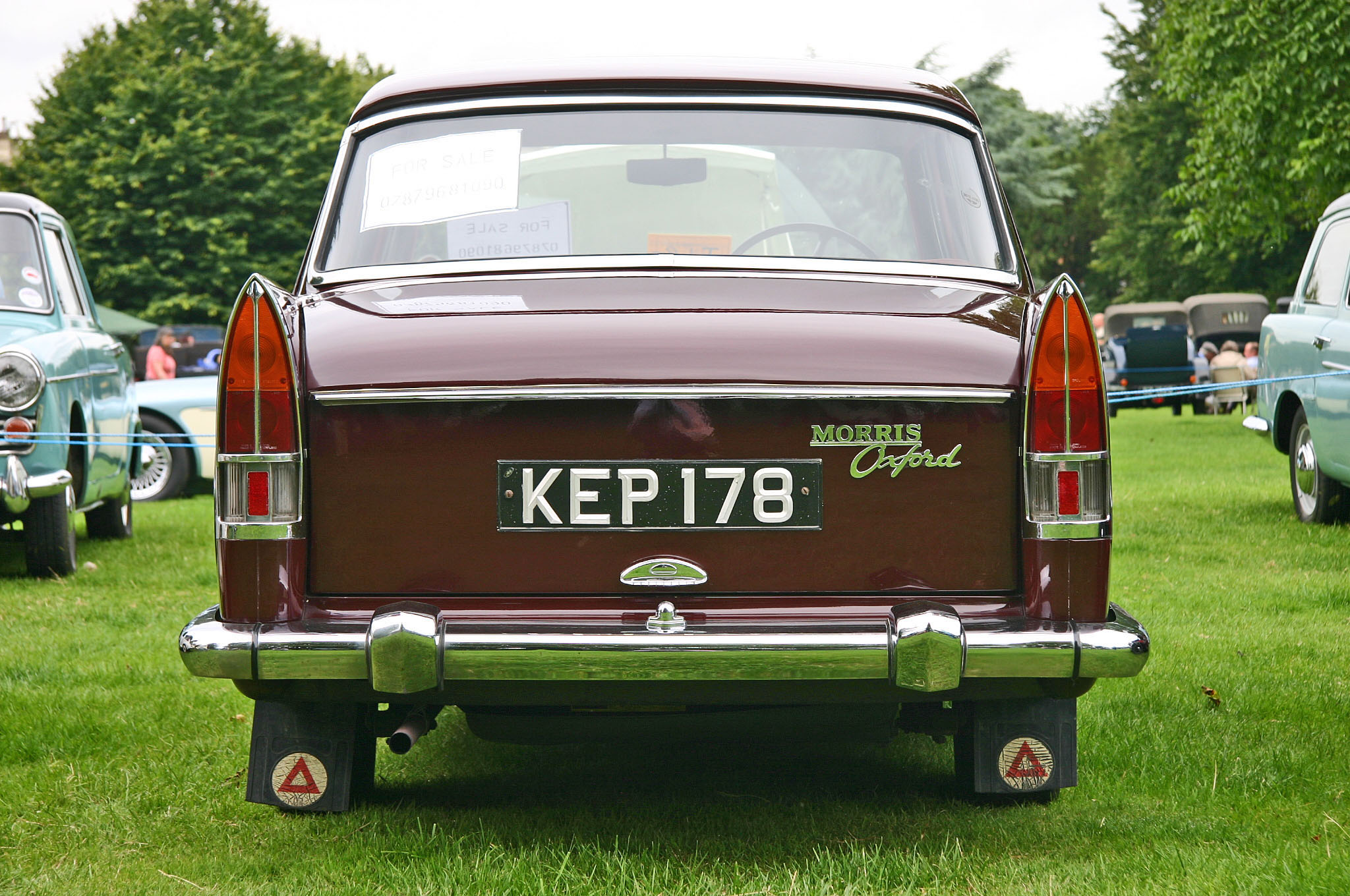
Oxford Series V

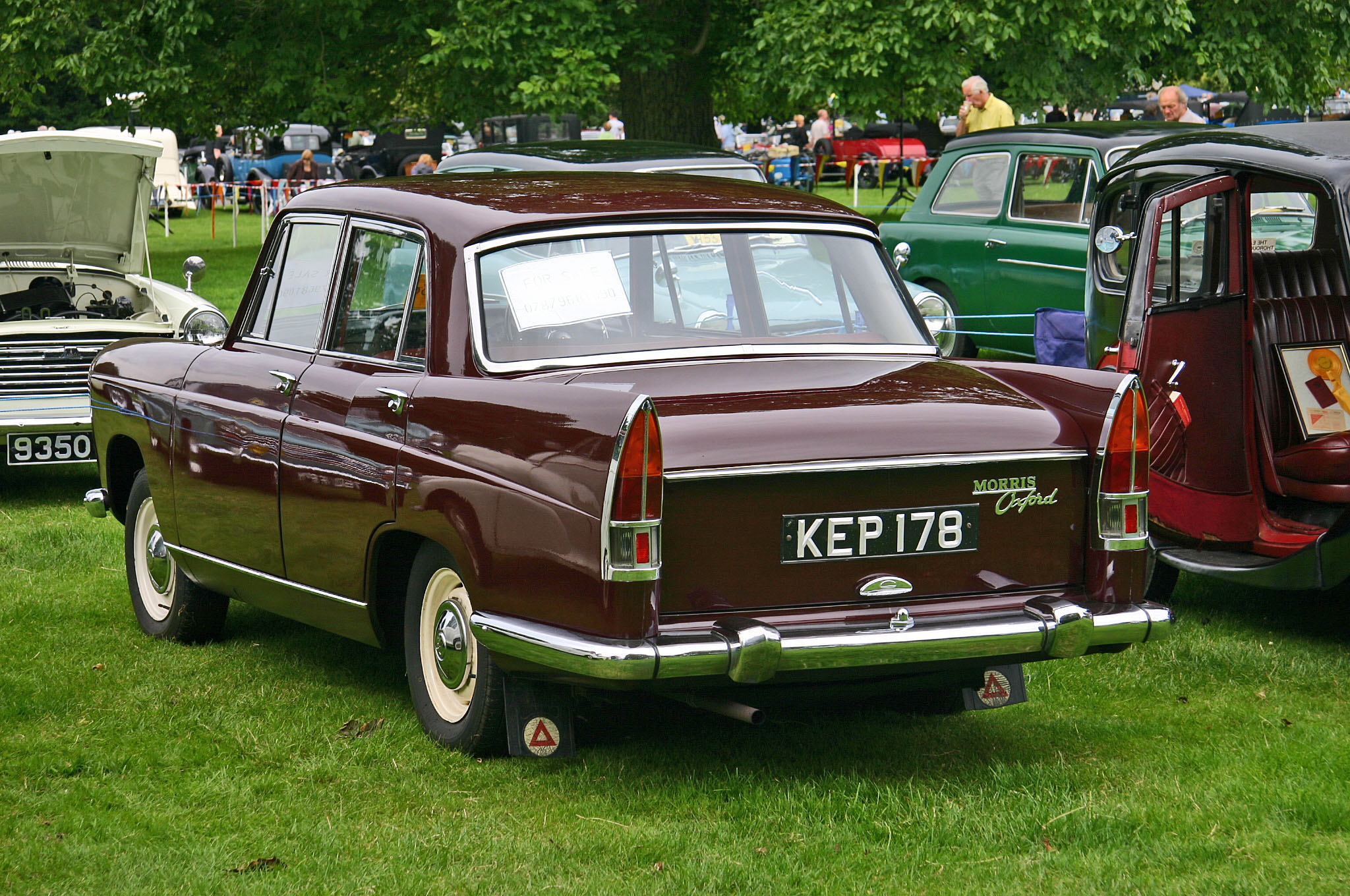
Note the large tail fins of the original Farina series

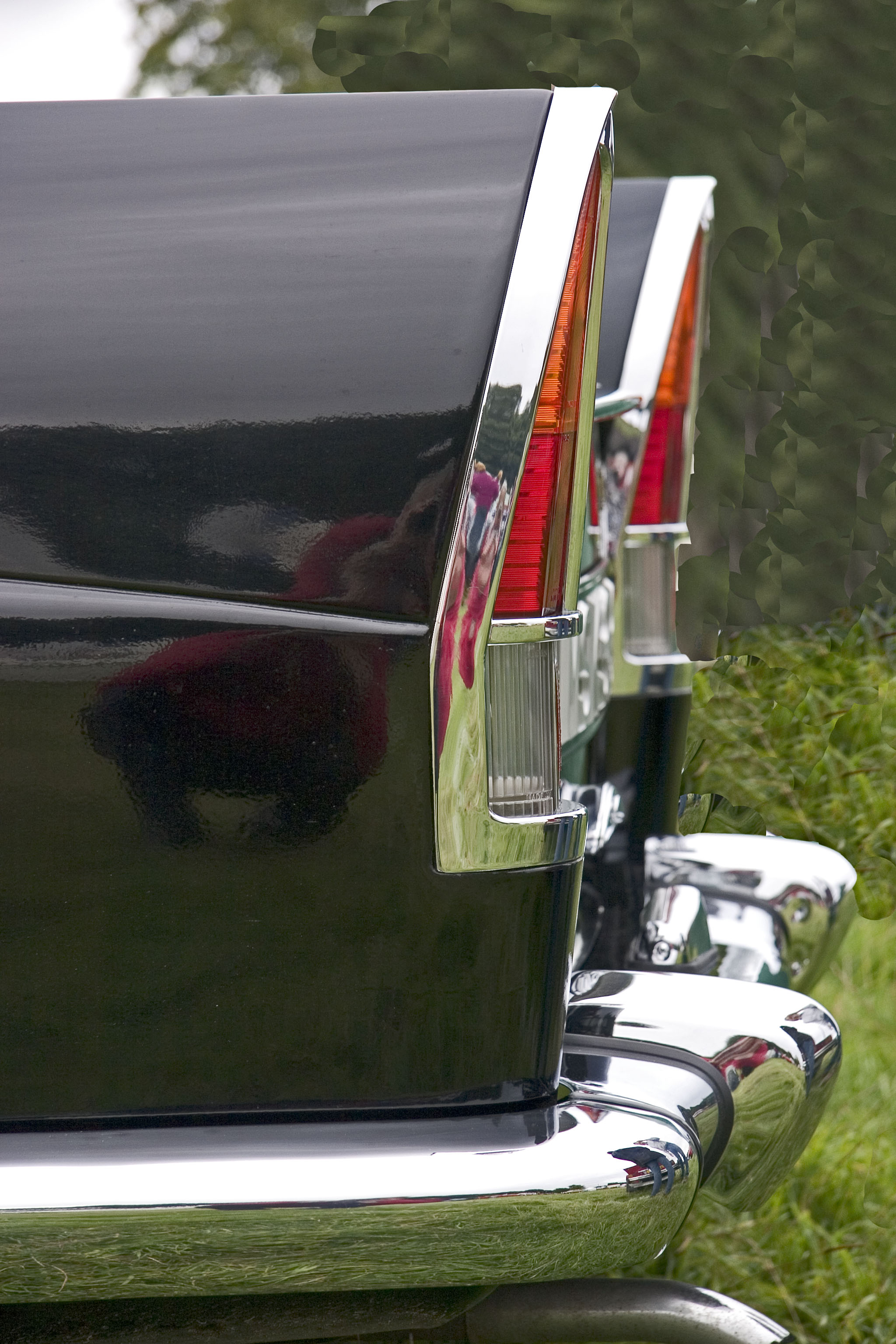
Detail of rear fins

== Oxford Series VI (1961–1971) ==
Oxford Series VI
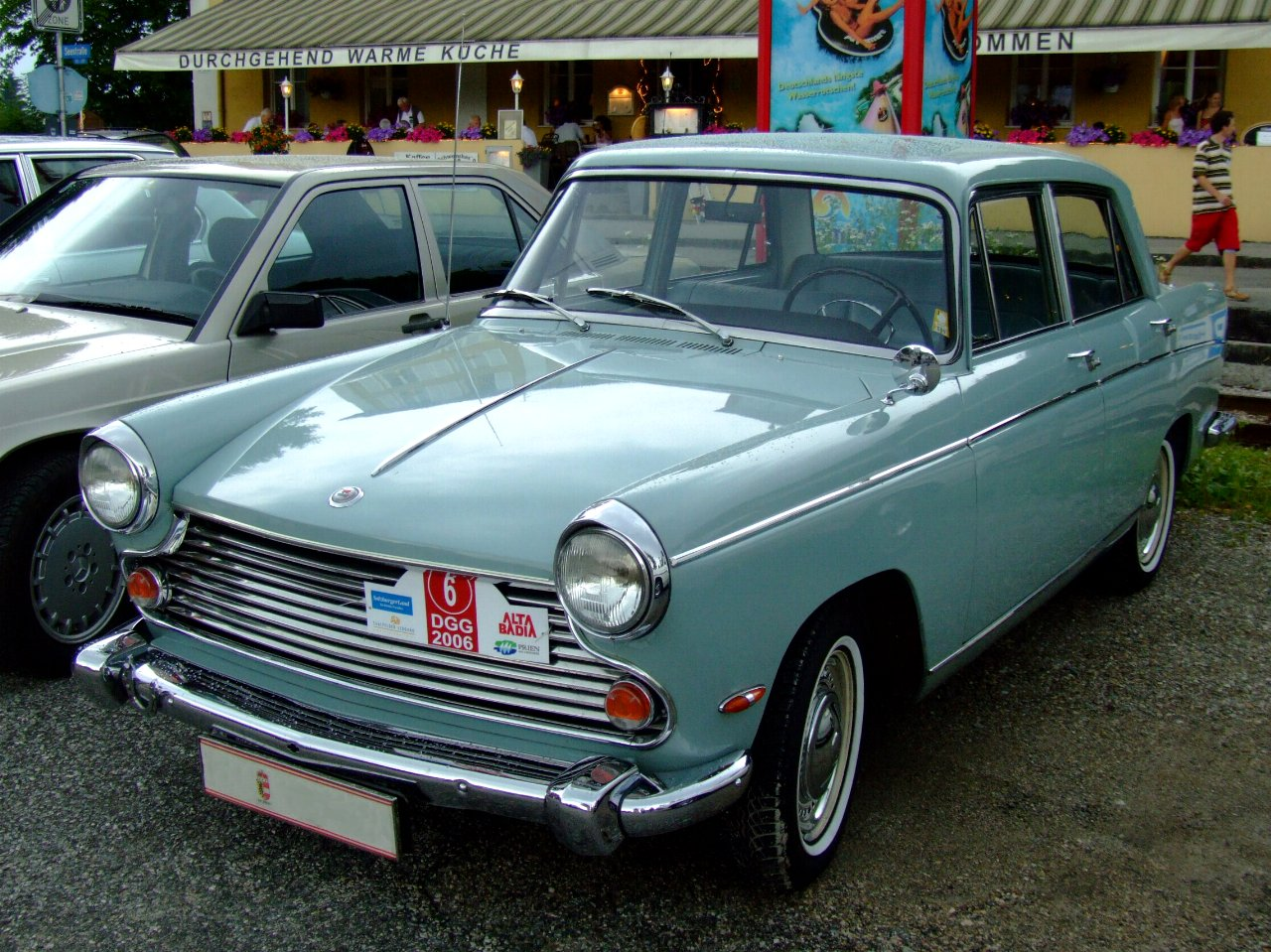
- Oxford Series VI 1965

Overview
- Production: 1961–1971; 208,823 produced

Body and chassis
- Body style: 4-door saloon 4-door estate
- Related: Austin A60 Cambridge; Riley 4/72

Powertrain
- Engine: 1622 cc BMC B-Series engine I4

Dimensions
- Wheelbase: 100 in (2,500 mm)
- Length: 174 in (4,400 mm)
- Width: 63.5 in (1,610 mm)

Chronology
- Predecessor: Morris Oxford Series V
- Successor: Morris 1800; Morris Marina

All five Farina cars were updated in October 1961 with a new 1.6 L (1622 cc/98 in^{3}) version of the B-Series engine, longer wheelbase and a new revised look. The tail fins had been trimmed and there were still detail changes between the marques. The Morris retained the Series V dash, while the Austin had an all-new fake woodgrain design.

=== Traveller ===
The Morris Oxford Traveller (estate) Series V was replaced by a Series VI, although little changed apart from the front grille.

=== Diesel ===
A diesel engined Oxford Series VI, introduced shortly after the 1961 update, was popular as a taxi. Variants of the same diesel engine enjoyed a long life in marine applications.

The Oxford VI remained in production until 1971 with 208,823 produced. The Oxford range was to have been replaced by the 1967 Morris 1800 (a badge-engineered 1964 ADO17 Austin 1800), but in the event both were built in parallel until 1971 because in terms both of pricing and of interior space the 1800 fell into the market segment of a slightly larger car. The ADO17 1800 continued until 1975, when it was succeeded by the Princess. The car that took the Oxford's place at the smaller end of the market segment was the Morris Marina, which also succeeded the yet smaller Minor.

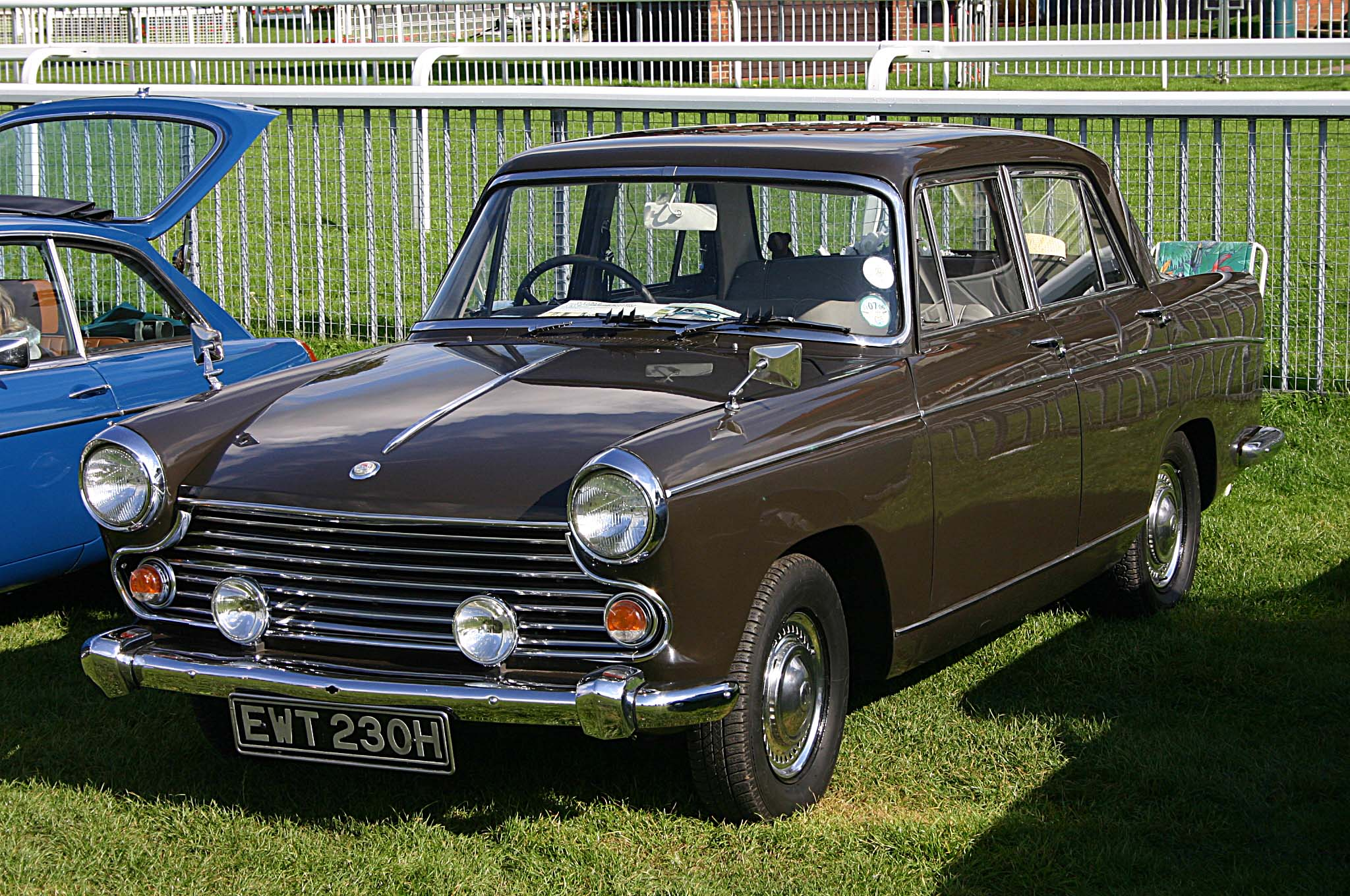
Series VI saloon

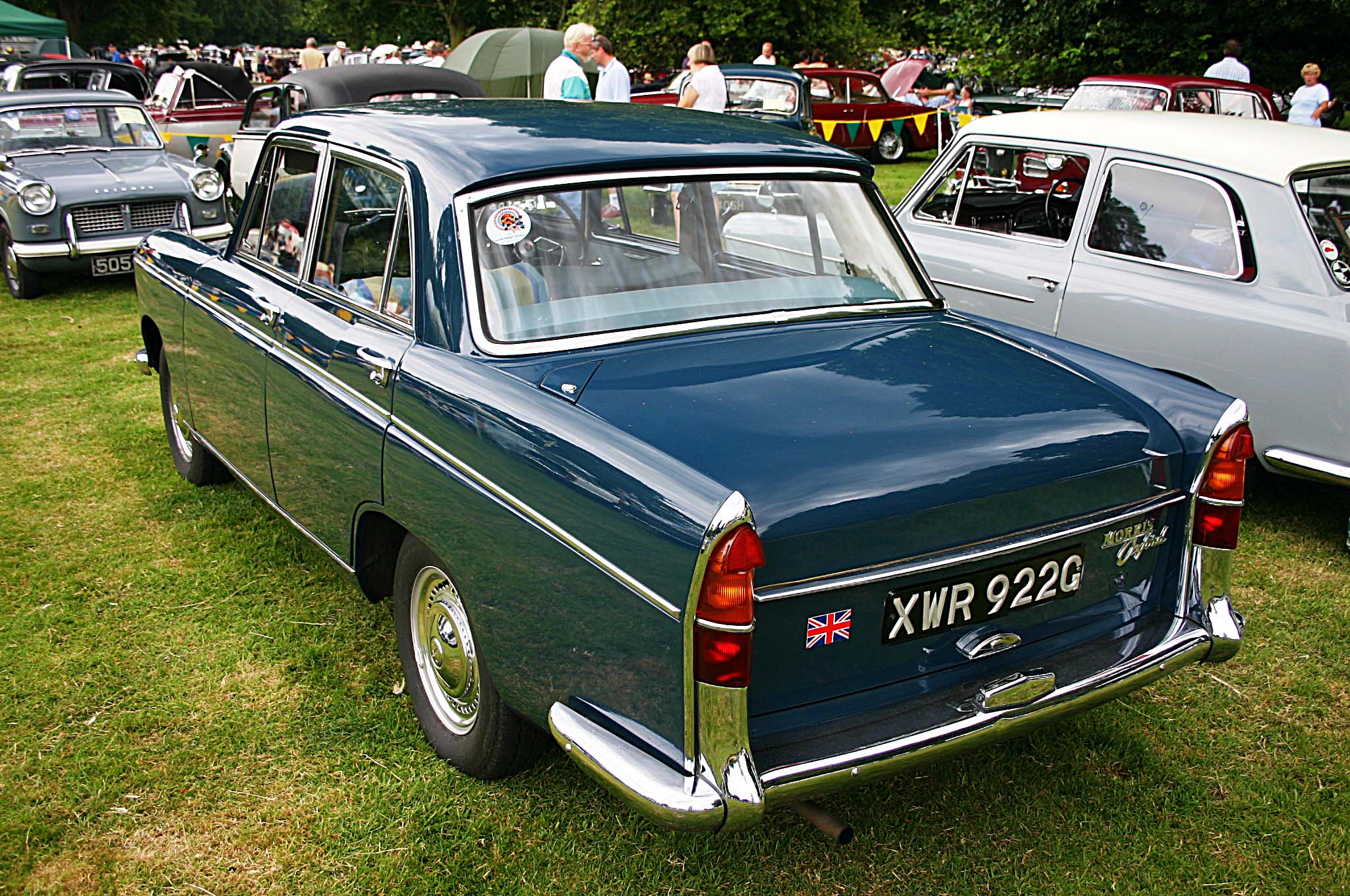
Note the reduced tail fins for the saloon
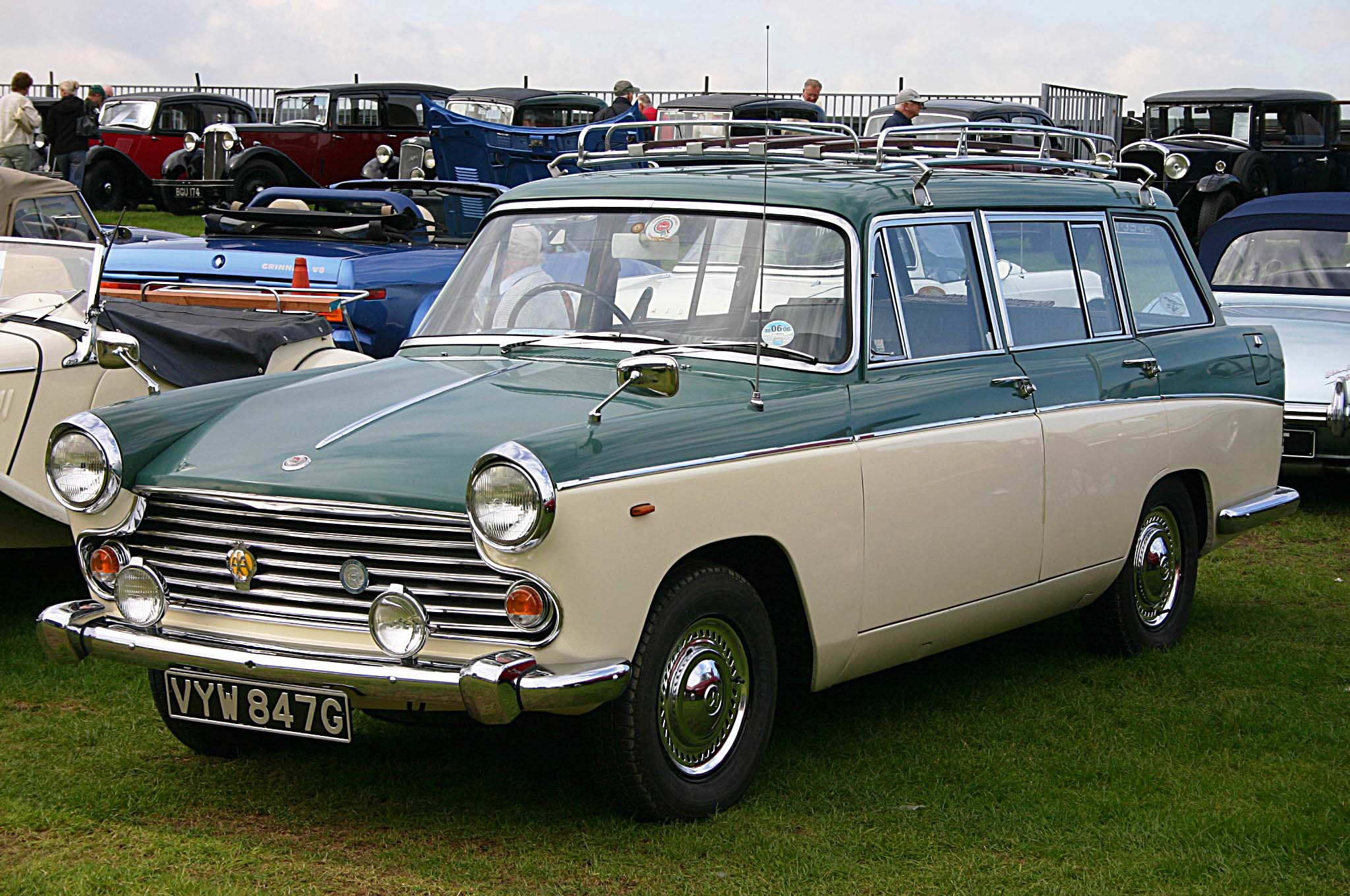
Series VI Traveller

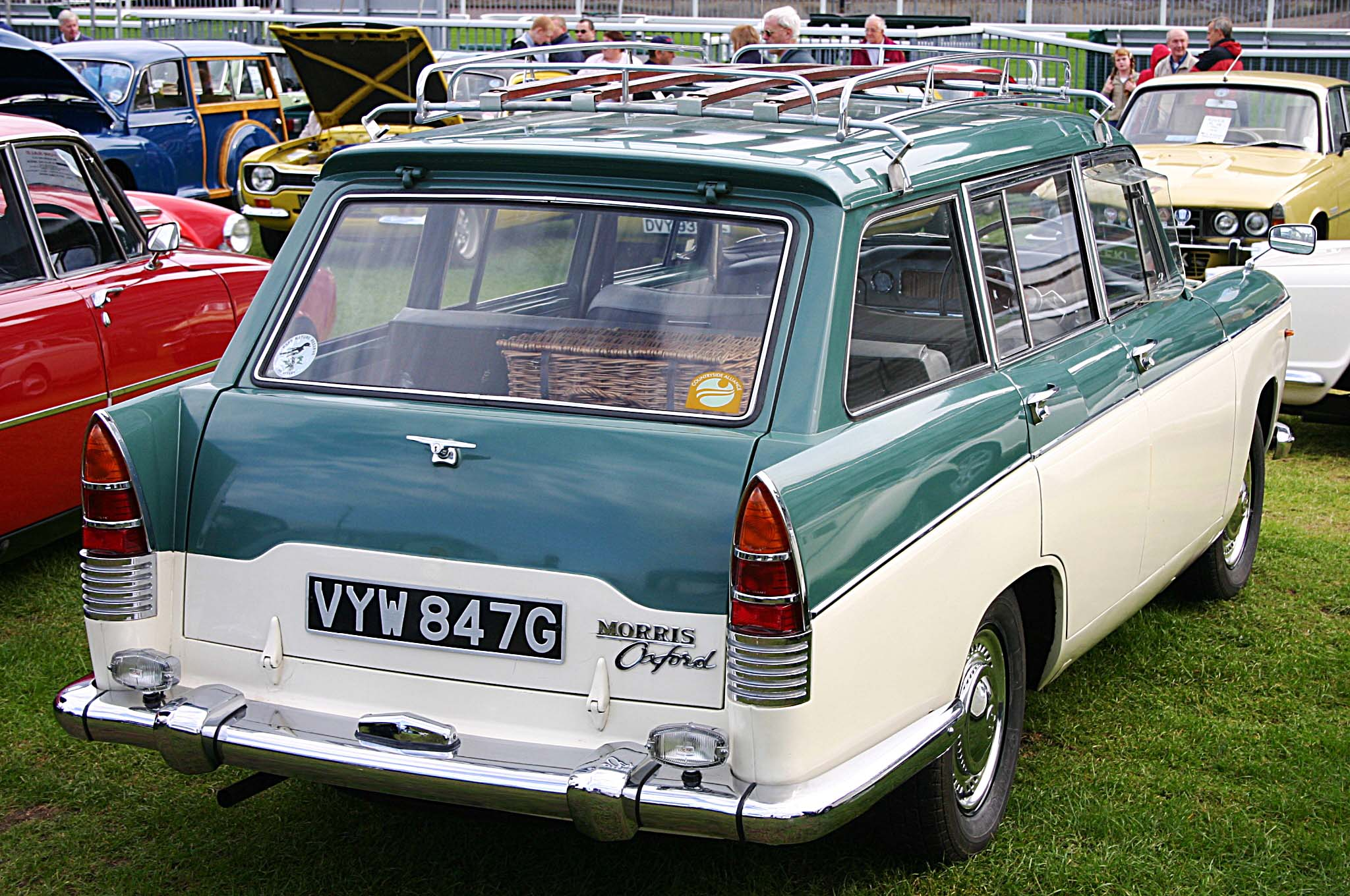
Fins unchanged for Series VI Traveller (estate) version
