= Wolseley 15/60 =

Wolseley 15/60 and 16/60
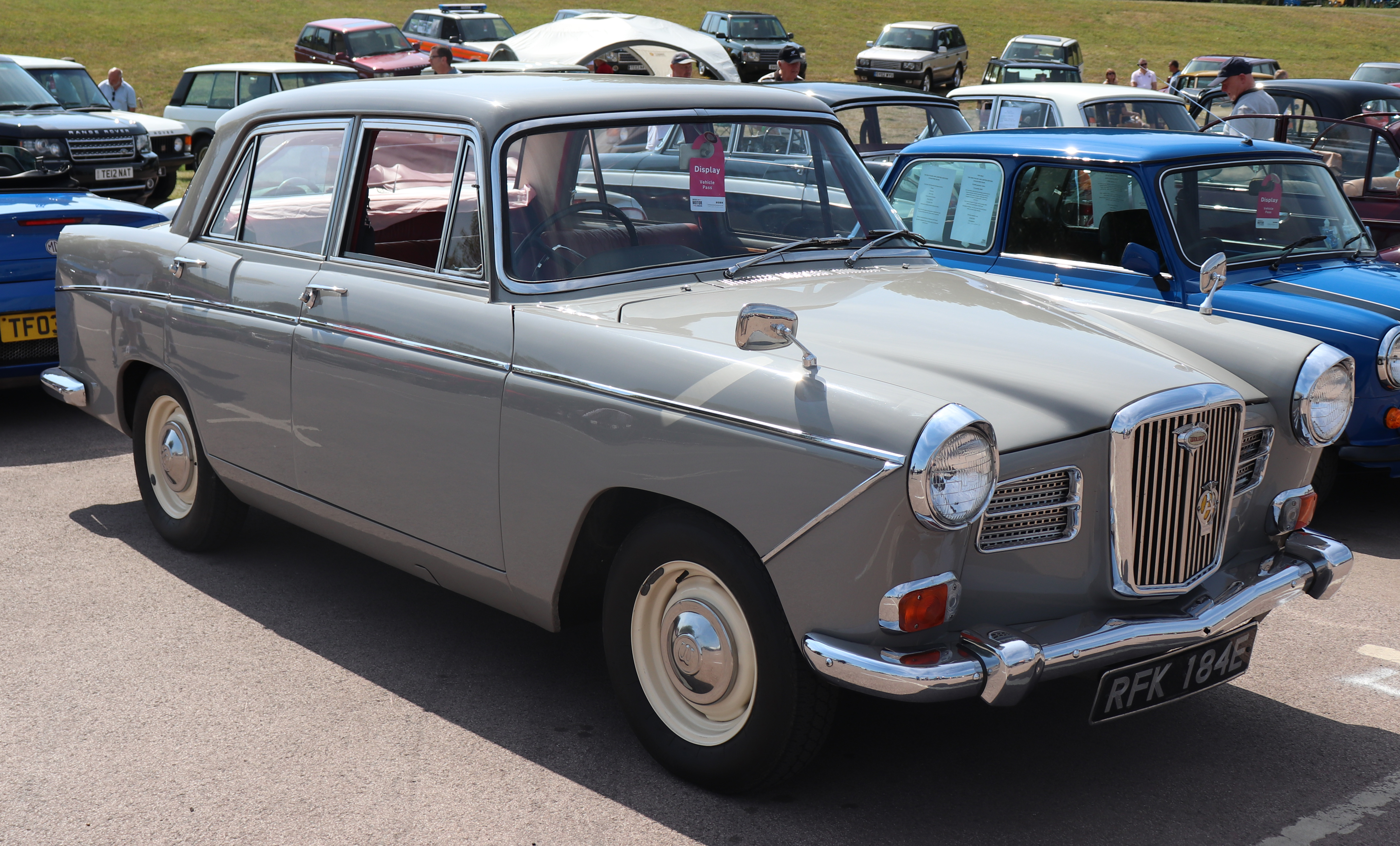
- 1967 Wolseley 16/60

Overview
- Manufacturer: BMC
- Production: 1958–1971; 87,661
- Designer: Pinin Farina

Body and chassis
- Class: Mid-size car
- Body style: 4-door saloon
- Layout: FR layout

Chronology
- Predecessor: Wolseley 15/50
- Successor: Wolseley 18/85

The Wolseley 15/60 is a mid-size automobile produced by the British Motor Corporation (BMC) from 1958 to 1961. Introduced in December 1958 as part of BMC's Wolseley marque, it was the first of a family of mid-size cars designed by Pinin Farina. The design was also used for models sold under the Austin, Morris, MG and Riley marques.

In 1961, the 15/60 was updated with a larger engine, chassis modifications and styling revisions to become the Wolseley 16/60. Production of the 16/60 continued until 24 April 1971.

Note that several other Farina-styled car lines were launched by BMC around the same time.

Introduction date	Farina model
September 1958	Austin A40
December 1958	Wolseley 15/60
January 1959	Austin A55 Cambridge Mark II
February 1959	MG Magnette Mark III
March 1959	Morris Oxford Series V
April 1959	Riley 4/Sixty-Eight
July 1959	Austin A99 Westminster
July 1959	Wolseley 6/99

== Wolseley 15/60 ==
Wolseley 15/60
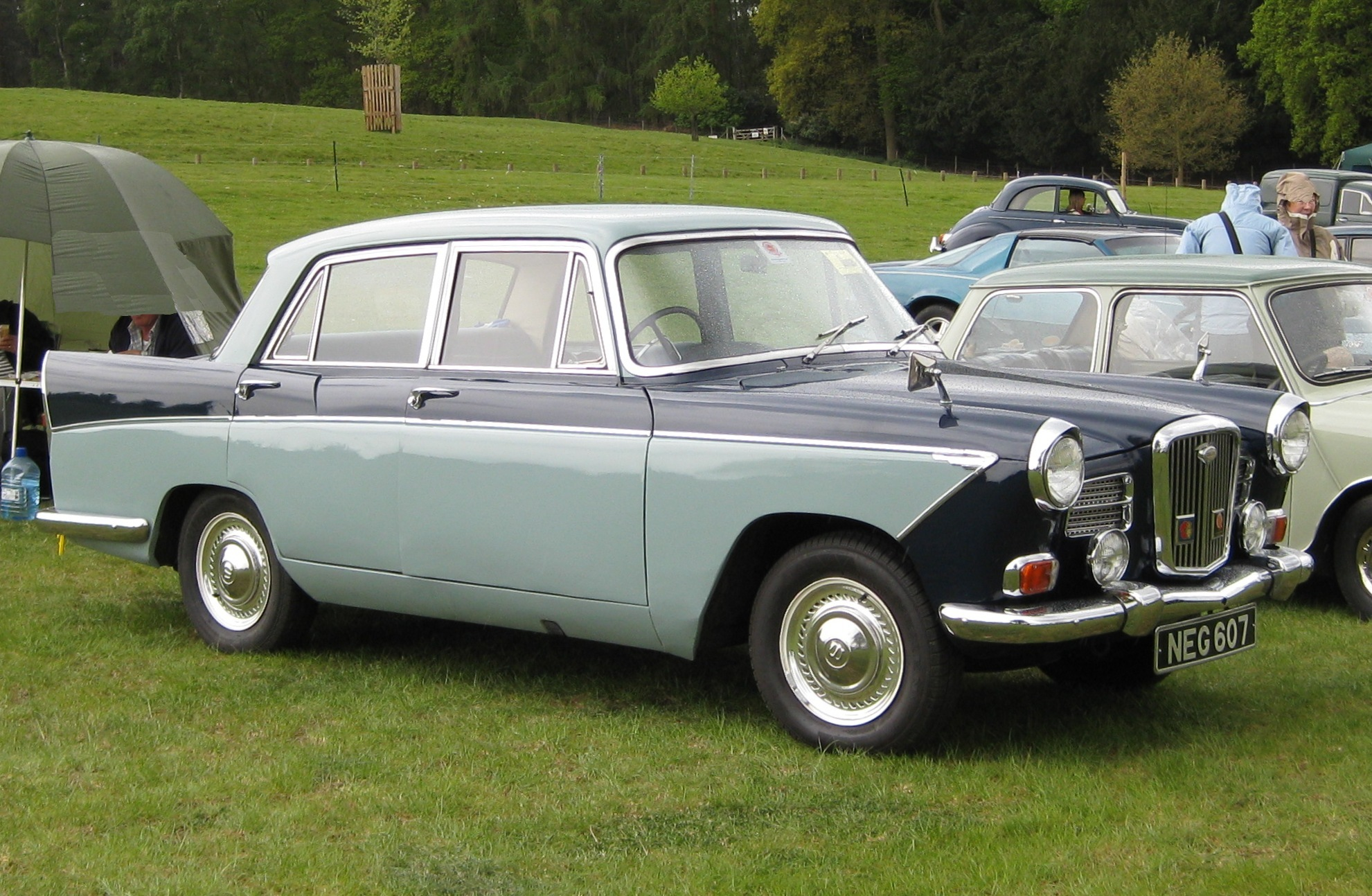

Overview
- Manufacturer: BMC
- Production: 1958–1961; 24,579
- Assembly: United Kingdom; Australia

Body and chassis
- Related: Austin A55 Cambridge; MG Magnette Mk. III; Morris Oxford V Riley 4/68; Di Tella 1500

Powertrain
- Engine: 1.5 L B-Series I4

Dimensions
- Wheelbase: 2,514 mm (99.0 in)
- Length: 4,520 mm (178.0 in)
- Width: 1,600 mm (63.0 in)
- Height: 59.25 in (1,505 mm)

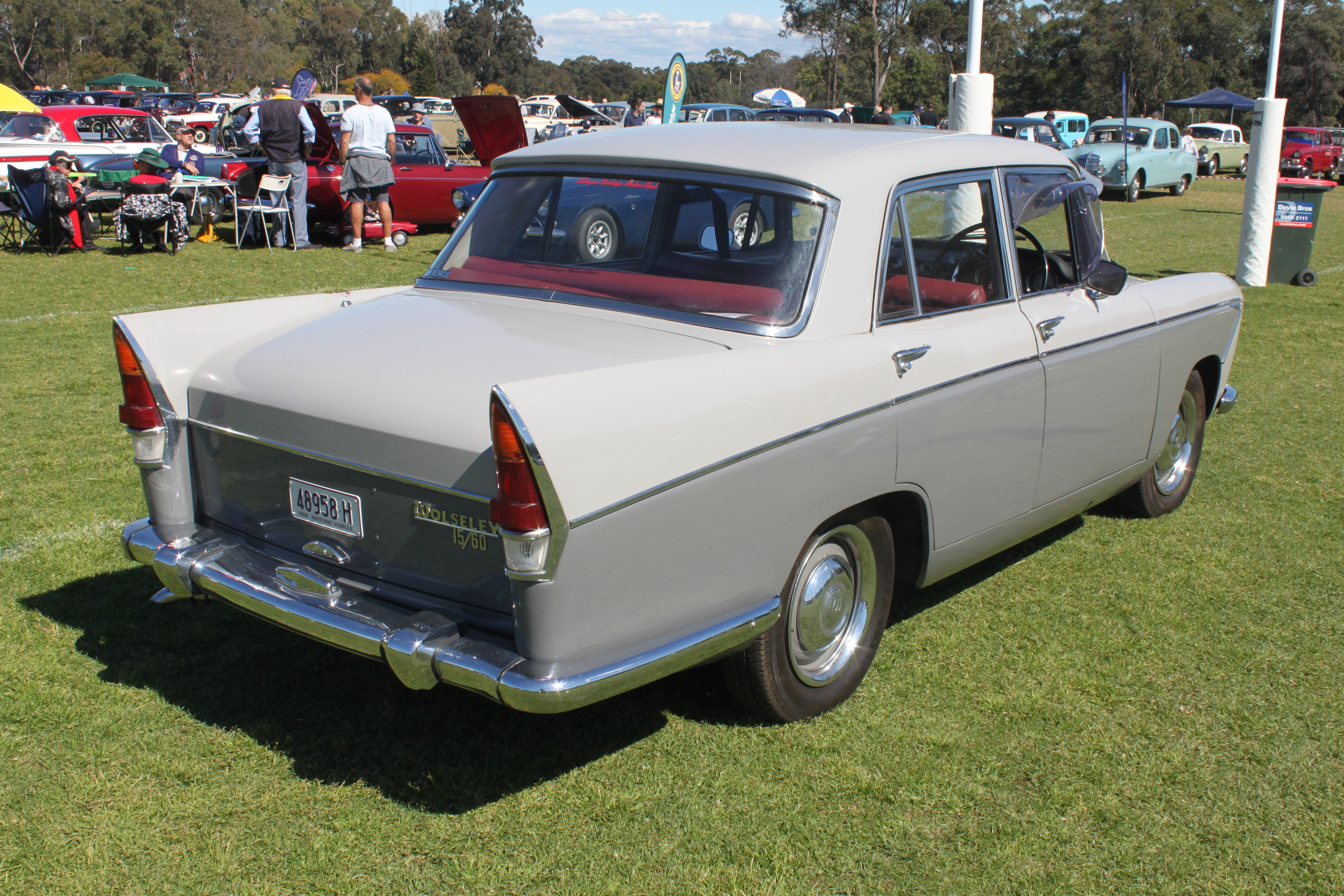
1961 Wolseley 15/60

The first generation of the mid-sized unitary construction Farinas was introduced with the Wolseley 15/60. Within months, the similar Riley 4/68, Austin A55 Cambridge Mark II, MG Magnette Mark III, and Morris Oxford V appeared as well. With its leather seats and polished wooden dashboard the Wolseley was positioned as the up-market non-sporting version in the range.

All five cars used the 1.5 L (1489 cc) B-Series inline-four engine, though different tuning gave varying power output. The Wolseley, together with the Austin Cambridge and the Morris Oxford, was at the bottom and with its single SU carburettor gave just 52 hp (39 kW; 53 PS). The front suspension was independent using coil springs with a live axle and semi elliptic leaf springs at the rear. The brakes were by Girling, hydraulically operated, with 9 in. (229 mm) drums. A cam and peg steering system was used.

The upholstery was in leather and had individual front seats that were set closely together to allow a central passenger to be carried allowing the car to be advertised as seating six although there was a floor mounted gear lever. The handbrake was between the driver's seat and the door. The rear seat had a folding central armrest. Wood veneer was used on the fascia and door cappings. A Smiths heater was fitted as standard. Either single or, as an option, two colour paint was used.

The Wolseley version was particularly easy to identify on the roads after dark thanks to the small illuminated badge on its grille, a feature shared with other Wolseleys of the period.

Later, the Farina design was licensed in Argentina and produced as the Di Tella 1500, Traveller, and Argenta.

A car tested by The Motor magazine in 1959 had a top speed of 76.6 mph (123.3 km/h) and could accelerate from 0-60 mph (97 km/h) in 25.6 seconds. A fuel consumption of 31.0 miles per imperial gallon (9.1 L/100 km; 25.8 mpg_{‑US}) was recorded. The test car cost £991 including taxes of £331.

== Wolseley 16/60 ==
Wolseley 16/60
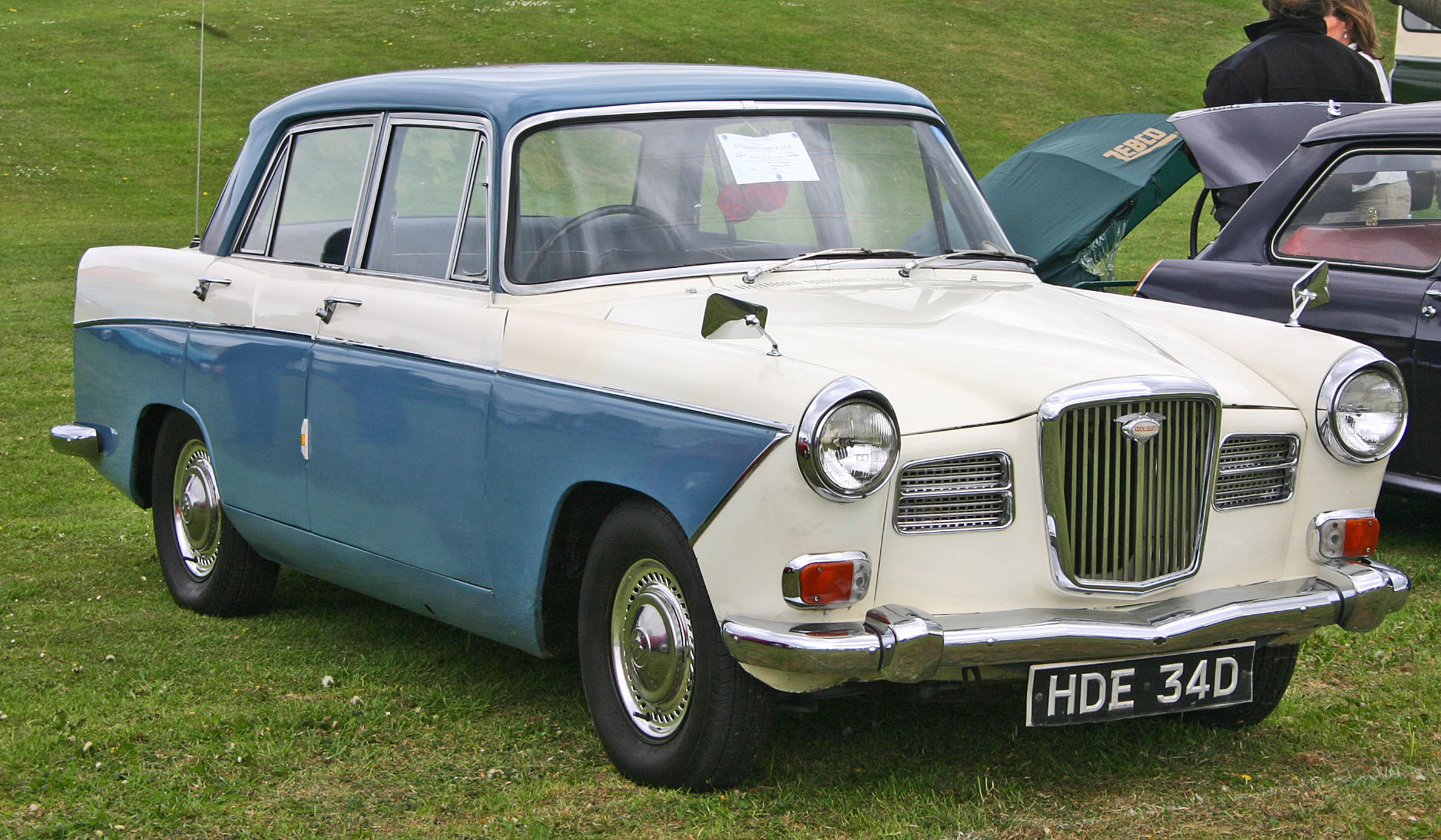

Overview
- Manufacturer: BMC
- Also called: Wolseley 4/60 (Netherlands)
- Production: 1961–1971; 63,082

Body and chassis
- Related: Austin A60 Cambridge; MG Magnette Mark IV; Morris Oxford VI; Riley 4/72

Powertrain
- Engine: 1.6 L B-Series I4
- Transmission: 4-speed manual automatic

The 15/60 was replaced by the Wolseley 16/60 in October 1961. There were four major changes:

1. More powerful engine, with displacement increased from 1,489 cc to 1,622 cc.
2. Automatic transmission introduced as an option.
3. Chassis modifications to improve road holding and handling.
4. Tail fins reduced in height with modified tail lamps and bumpers.

For some buyers, the most important change was the availability of Borg Warner 35 automatic transmission. Buyers choosing the four-speed manual transmission version may have been disappointed to find that the 1961 16/60 still came without synchromesh on first gear. By this time all-synchromesh gear-boxes were the norm for most competitor vehicles in the UK.

Viewed from the outside, the most obvious change to the Wolseley 16/60 was the reduction in the height of its tail fins. The rear bumper overriders were less prominent than those on the earlier model, while the tail lamp clusters were redesigned to complement the revised tail-fin profile.

The 1,622 cc Farina models remained in production until 1971. Production of the MG models ended in 1968, followed by the Austin and Riley models in 1969, while the Wolseley and Morris models remained in production until 1971.

The 16/60 models generally used the 1.6 L (1622 cc) B-Series engine, with an optional diesel also being offered in some markets. The Wolseley shared its 61 hp (45 kW; 62 PS) single carburettor engine with the Austin and Morris versions, while the MG and Riley with two SU carburettors had 68 hp (51 kW; 69 PS).

== Production Figures ==
Model	Production Years	Total Production
15/60	1958–1961	24,579
16/60	1961–1971	63,101

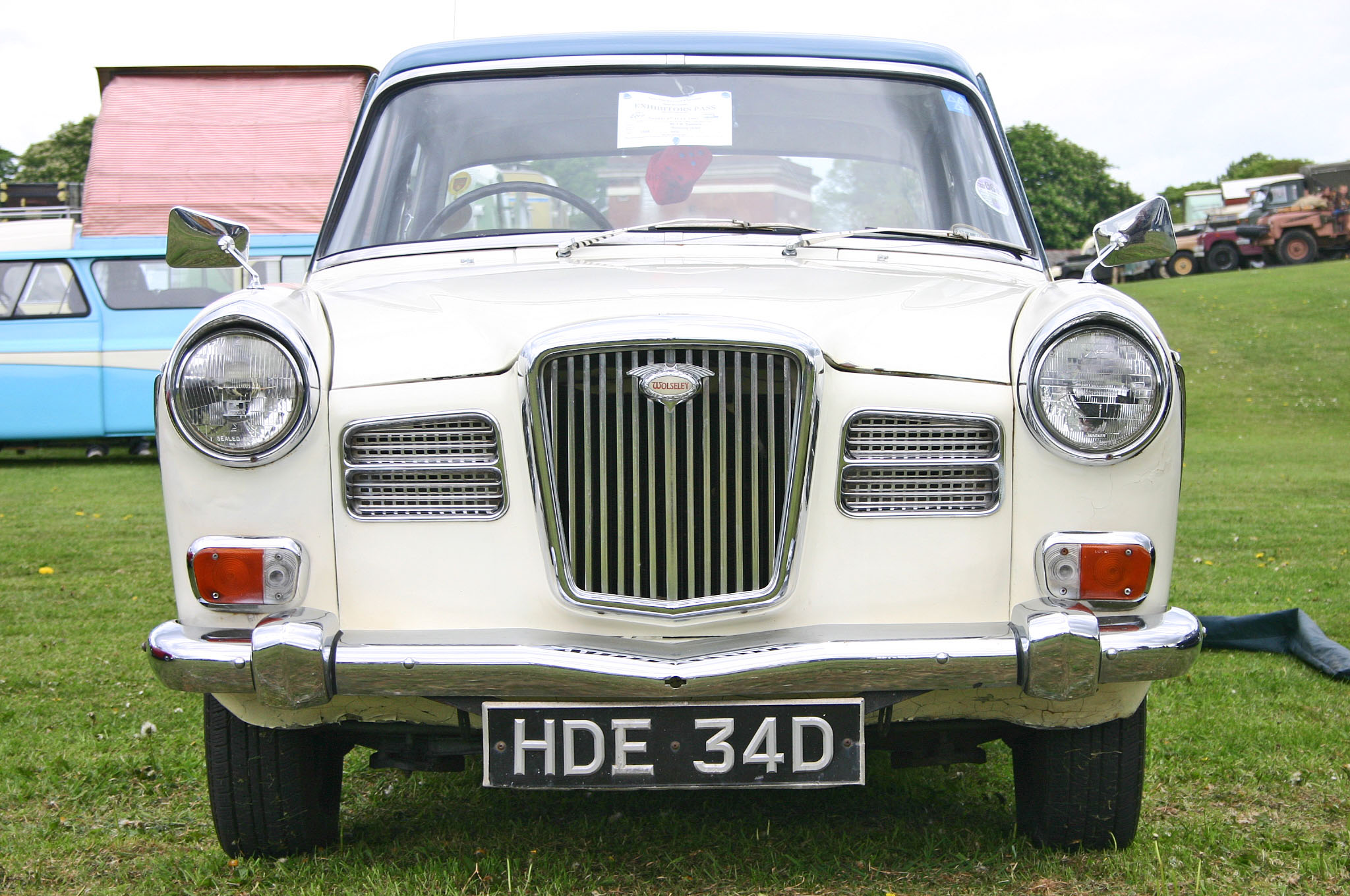
Wolseley 16/60

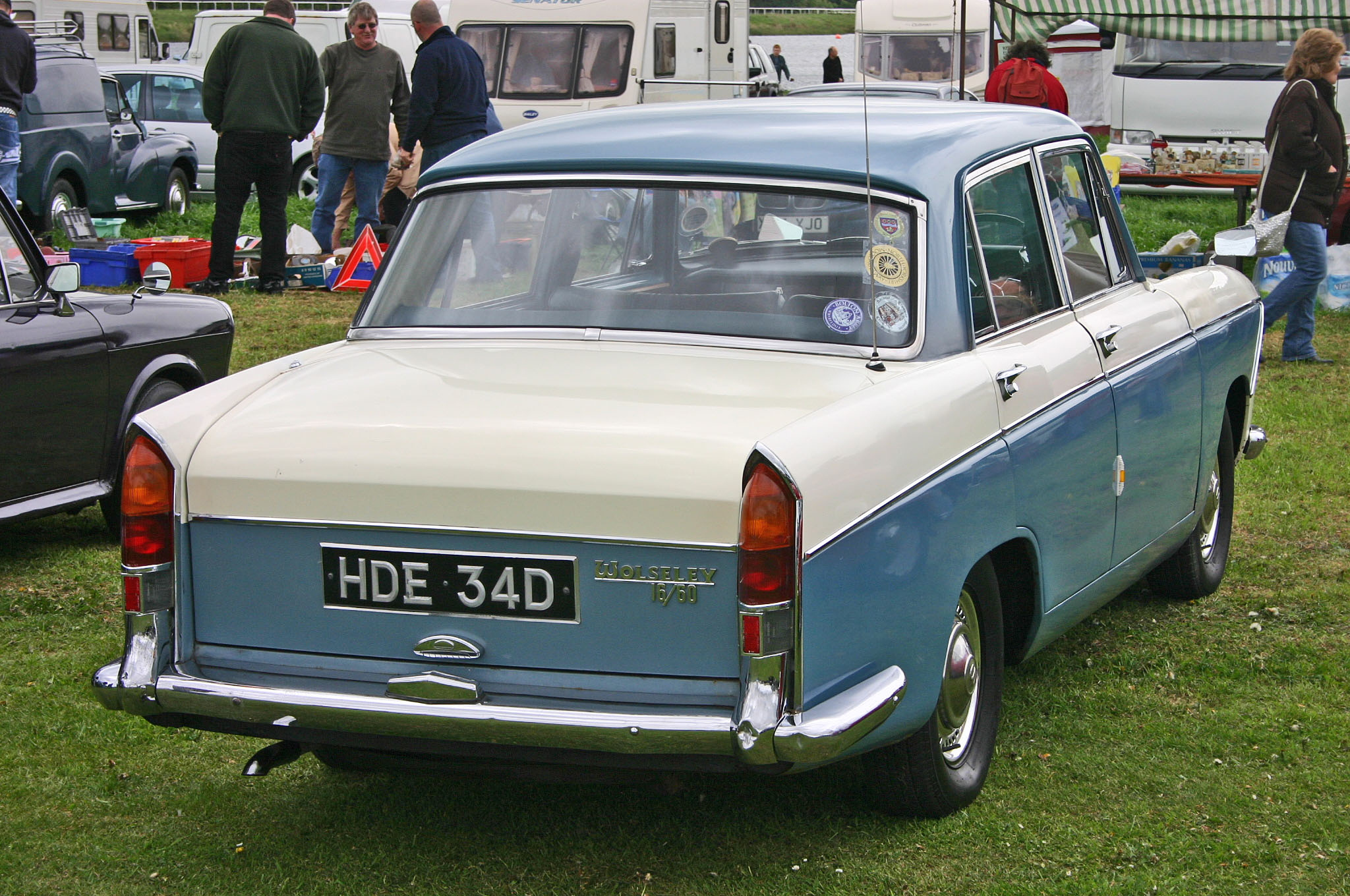

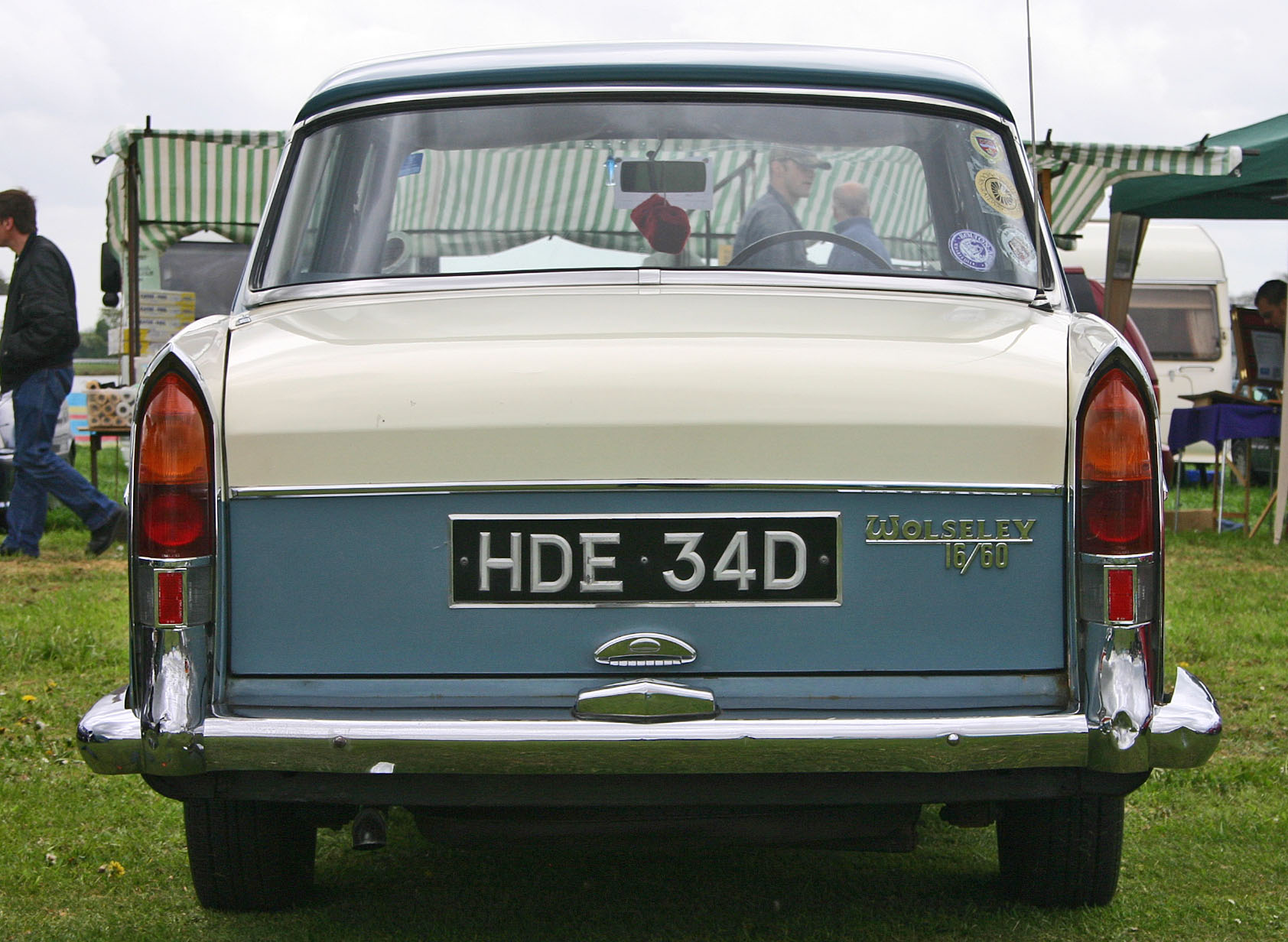

== See also ==
- Wolseley 24/80 — a six-cylinder car derived from the British model and produced in Australia between 1962 and 1965.
