= Riley 4 =

Riley 4 Farina-styled B-series
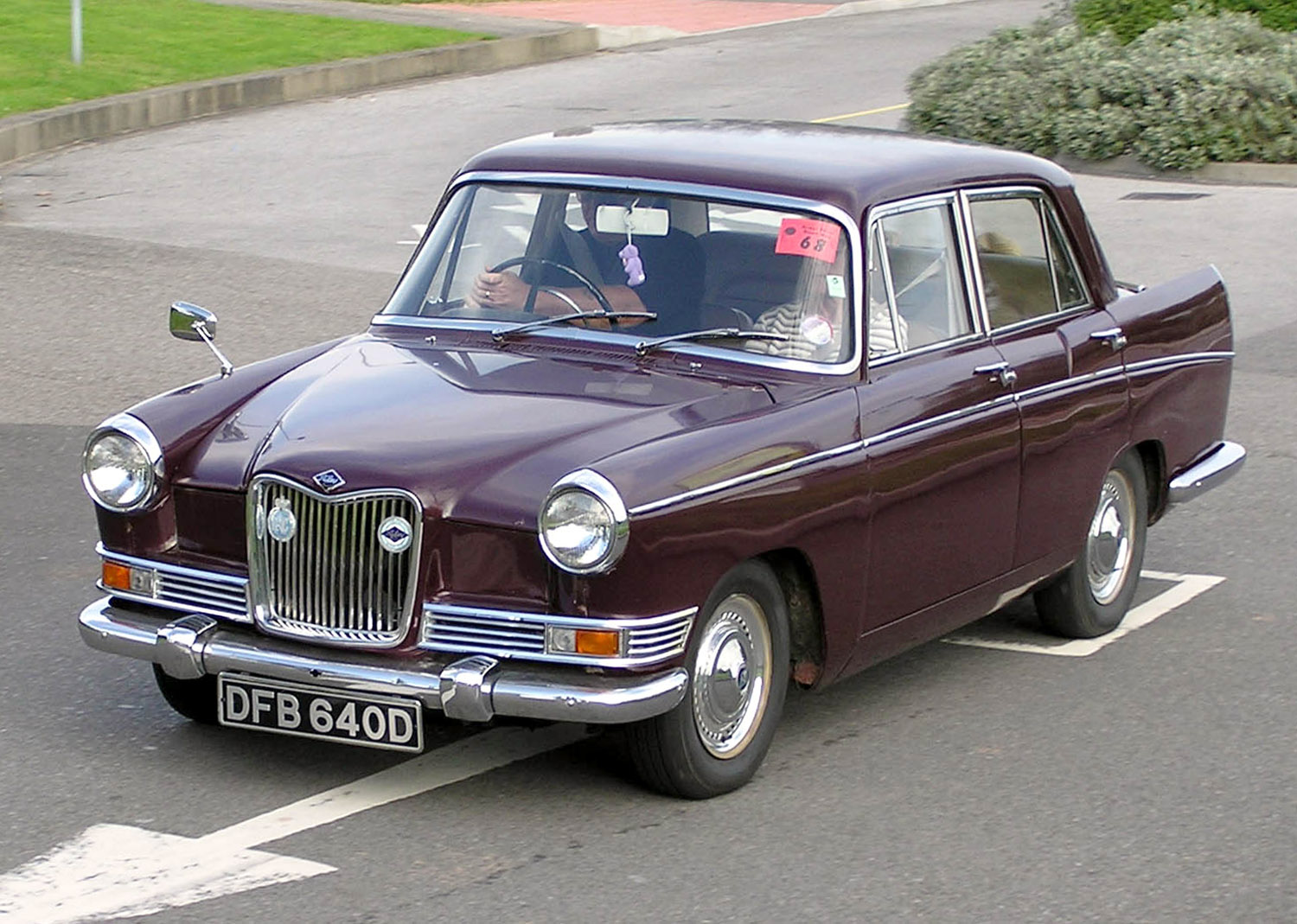
- Riley 4 / Seventy Two sports saloon 1622cc first registered 4 May 1966

Overview
- Manufacturer: BMC
- Production: 1959–1969; 25,091 made

Body and chassis
- Class: full-size car
- Related: MG Magnette Mark III; Wolseley 15/60; Austin A55 Cambridge Mark II; Morris Oxford V Siam Di Tella 1500 (Argentina)

Chronology
- Predecessor: Riley RME (1945–1955)
- Successor: none

The Riley 4 / Sixty Eight and Riley 4 / Seventy Two are cars produced by BMC from 1959 to 1969, under the Riley marque. They are closely related to the Pinin Farina-designed MG Magnette Mark III and Wolseley 15/60 and the simpler Austin A55 Cambridge Mark II, Morris Oxford V pair, sharing the MG's rear styling and engine (with a milder cam). This Riley was the most expensive car in that series.

This model's introduction, using the same engine, did not affect production of the smaller-bodied 1½-litre Riley One-Point-Five sports saloon which continued until 1965.

== Riley 4 / Sixty Eight ==
Riley 4 / Sixty Eight
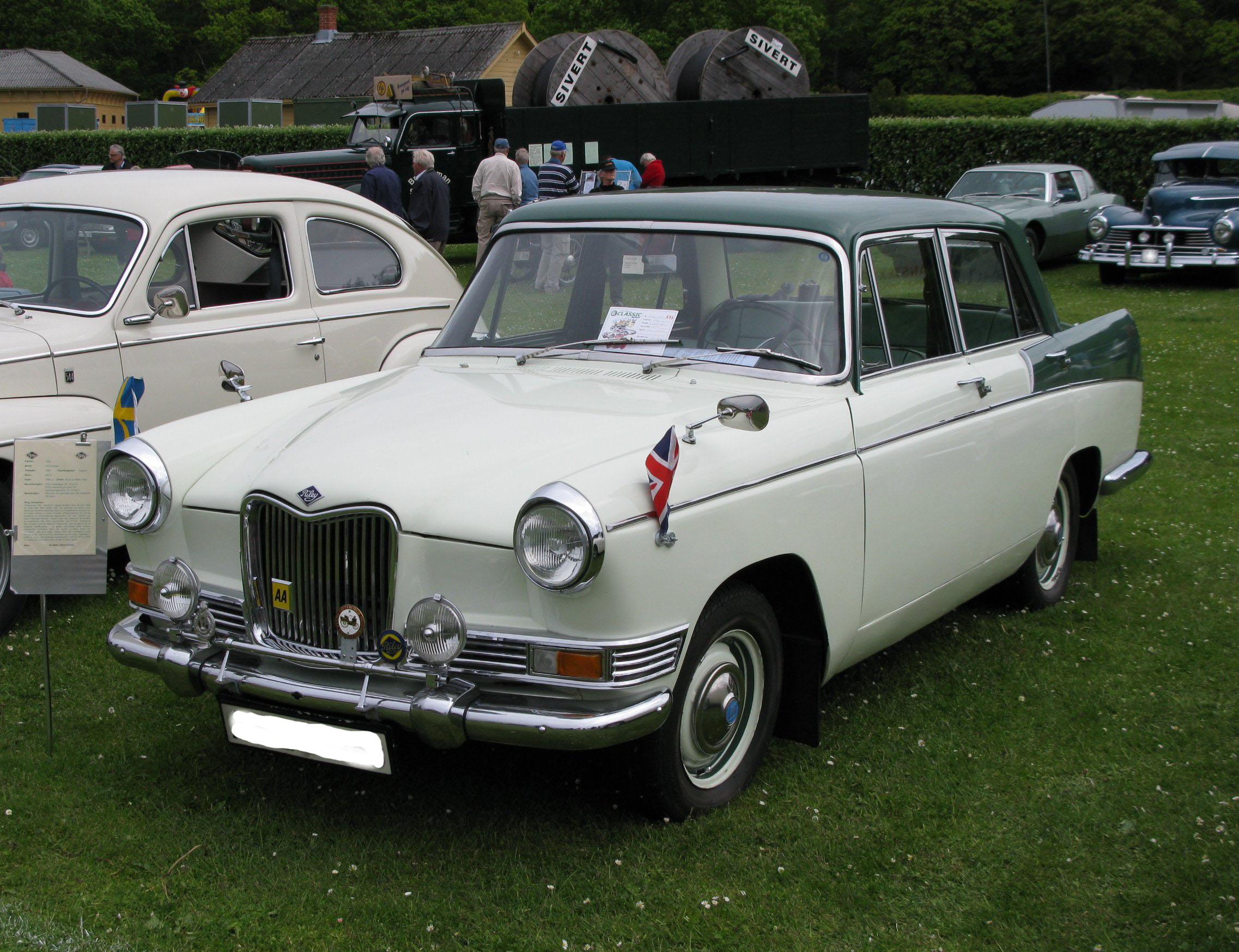
- Riley 4 / Sixty Eight sports saloon

Overview
- Also called: Riley Fordor (Spain); Siam Di Tella 1500 (Argentina)
- Production: 1959–1961; 10,940 made
- Designer: Pinin Farina

Body and chassis
- Body style: 4-door saloon station wagon (Argentina); 2-door pick-up (Argentina)

Powertrain
- Engine: 1,489 cc (90.9 cu in) B-Series Straight-4

Dimensions
- Wheelbase: 99.25 in (2,521 mm) track
- Length: 178 in (4,521 mm)
- Width: 63.5 in (1,613 mm)
- Height: 57 in (1,448 mm)
- Kerb weight: 36 cwt 2,604 lb (1,181 kg)

Launched in April 1959, the 4 / Sixty Eight was the last of the five B series BMC Pininfarina cars to be released. The Riley used the twin-carburettor B-Series straight-4 engine in the form already familiar to drivers of the MG Magnette III, producing 64 bhp (48 kW). This was 6 hp (4.5 kW) more than the similar Wolseley 15/60.

From the outside the car was distinguished from its siblings by a Riley grille on the front and (apart from the MG with which it shared its tail treatment) slightly less acute tail fins at the back. Inside, the fascia was relatively well equipped: this was the only one of the five cars to come with a rev counter as standard equipment.

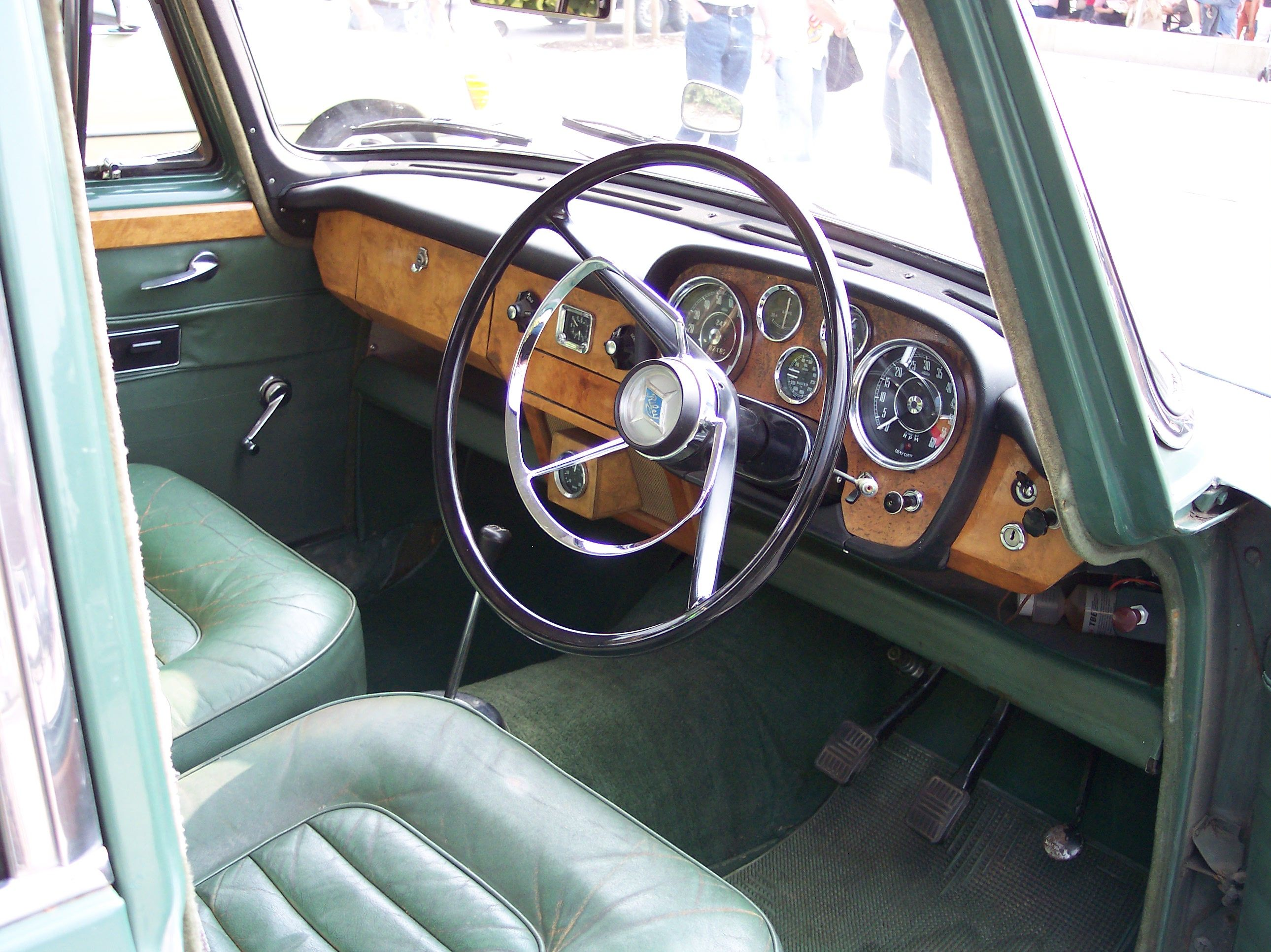
Instrument panel Riley 4 / Seventy Two sports saloon

=== On the road ===
A car was tested by the British magazine The Motor in 1959 and had a top speed of 88.2 mph (141.9 km/h) and could accelerate from 0-60 mph (97 km/h) in 18.8 seconds. A fuel consumption of 27.3 miles per imperial gallon (10.3 L/100 km; 22.7 mpg_{‑US}) was recorded. The test car cost £1028 including taxes.

It was intended to be the most luxurious of the Farina-styled B-series cars and was priced accordingly. A brief road test was published under the headline: "Comfort not Sacrificed to Appearance in New Riley". The motoring correspondent of The Times reported the more expensive Riley shared a similar specification with the MG Magnette Mark III but the Riley had different points of styling and its very full equipment list included a tachometer. The driver sat upright and gained a sense of mastery of the car steering from the well-furnished interior which had the right combination of leather, walnut veneer and pile carpet. Gear changing was easy through a well-placed central lever.

== Riley 4 / Seventy Two ==
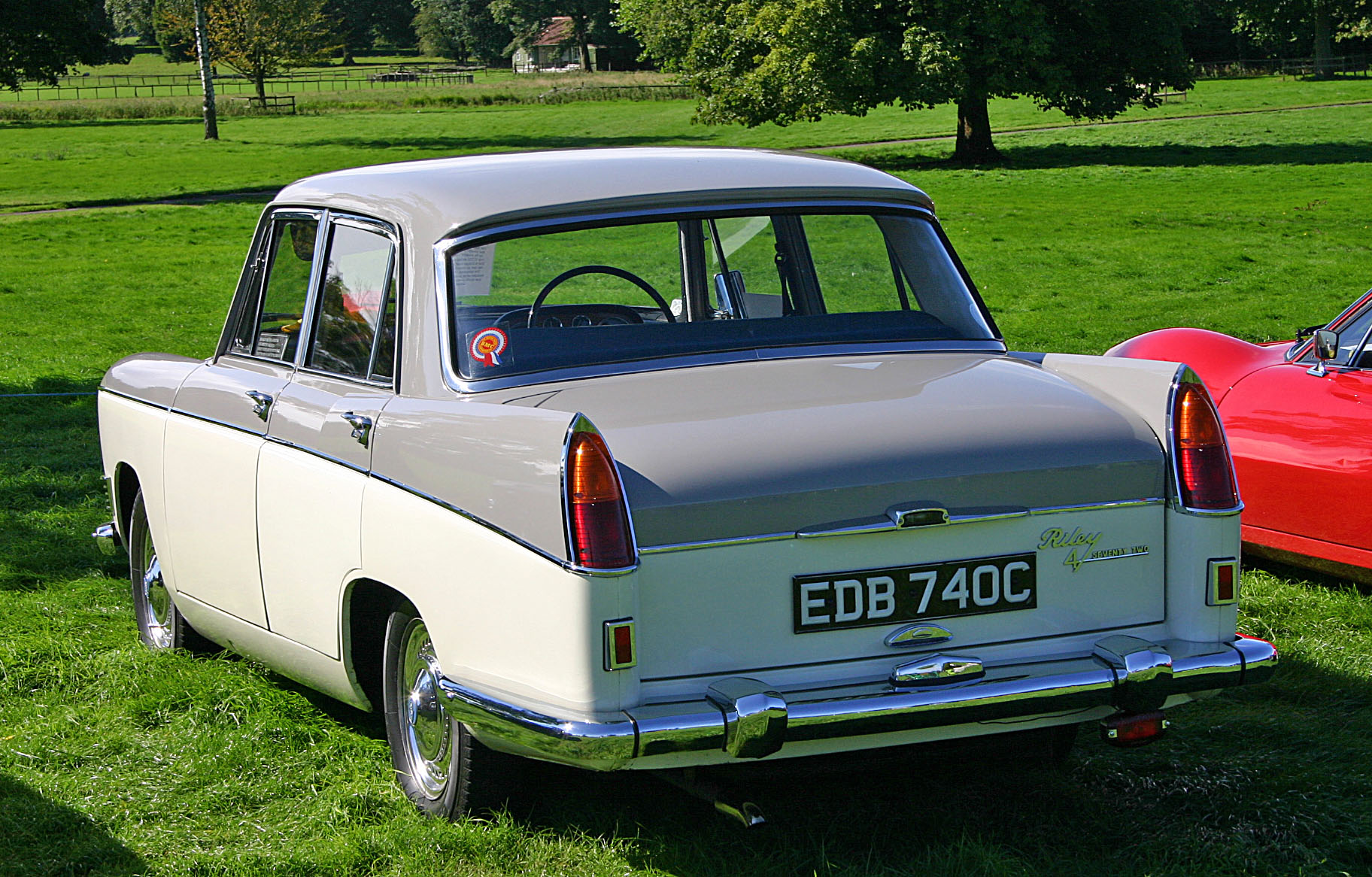
1965 Riley 4/72

Riley 4 / Seventy Two
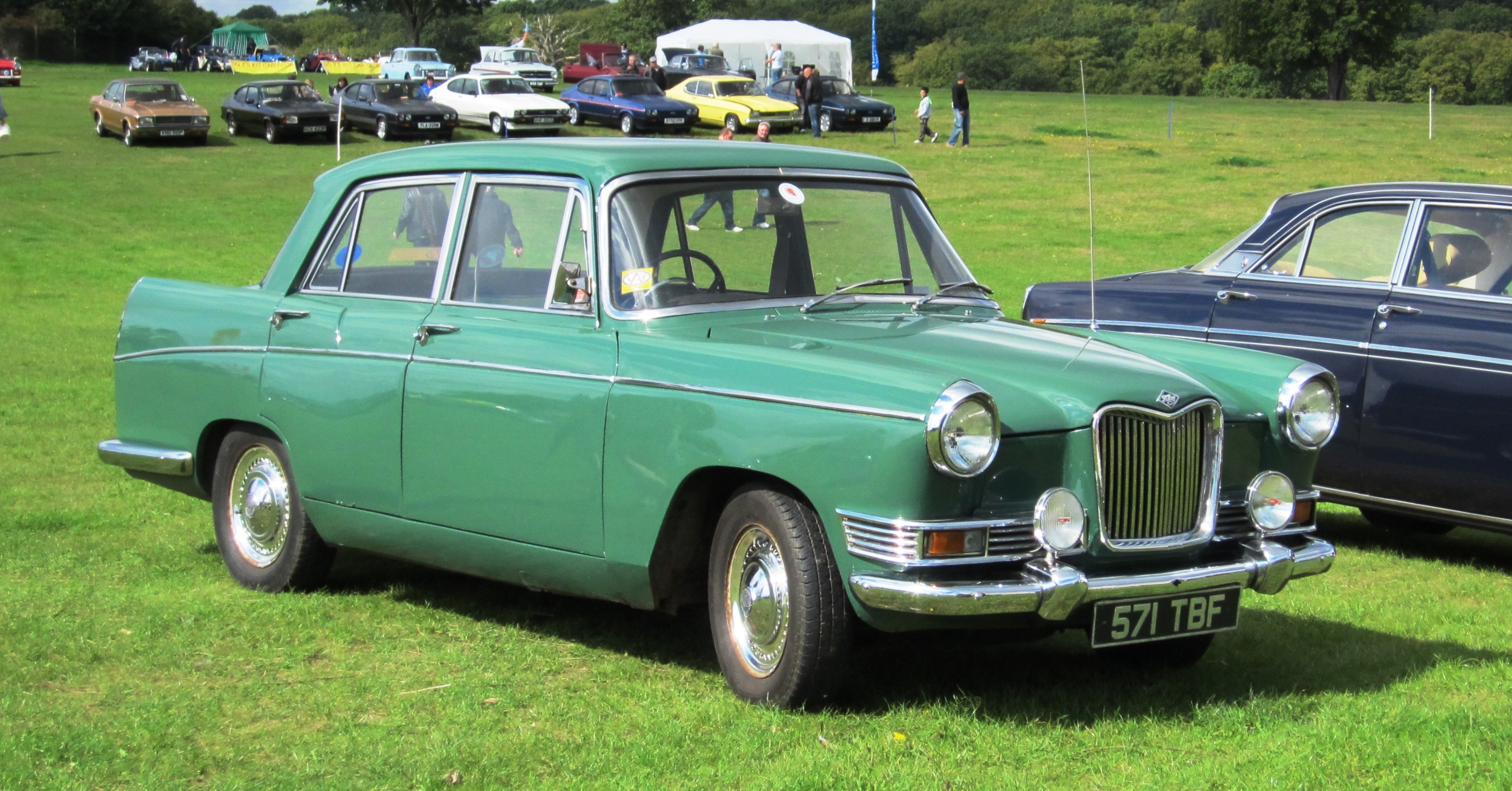
- Riley 4 / Seventy Two sports saloon 1622cc first registered May 1963

Overview
- Also called: Riley 1500 (Argentina); Riley Comet (Austria)
- Production: 1961–1969; 14,151 made

Body and chassis
- Body style: 4-door saloon

Powertrain
- Engine: 1,622 cc (99.0 cu in) B-Series Straight-4

Dimensions
- Wheelbase: 100.5 in (2,553 mm) track
- Height: 58 in (1,473 mm)

Just before the 1961 Motor Show, in October, the car became the 4/Seventy-Two. Closely related again was the 16/60 update to the Wolseley car. The engine was now 1.6 L (1622 cc), and Riley again got the twin-carb version with 68 hp (51 kW). It also used an improved suspension with anti-roll bars. The wheelbase was 1 in (25.4 mm) longer, through the moving of the back axle rearwards, and the front track was increased by 2 inches (5 cm). These modifications to the wheel locations were made at the same time to all the BMC Farina saloons, and were seen as an answer to criticism of the indifferent road holding of the 1959 cars. Borg Warner automatic transmission became an option in the Riley at the same time, making the Riley the first mass-produced car in Europe to adopt the Borg-Warner 35 system following Borg-Warner's establishment of a plant at Letchworth to produce a transmission package that ten years earlier had been developed for US applications.

Further modifications to the suspension a year later included 'recambering the rear springs' to improve ride and roadholding, but from the outside there was little to distinguish the later Rileys from the models as they had appeared in 1959, and the car continued very little changed until its withdrawal in 1969.

The 4/72's main competitor, appearing in 1963, was the Humber Sceptre from the Rootes Group – with an 85 hp engine, 6-speed manual (four direct ratios plus overdrive 3rd and 4th) or 3-speed automatic (post 1965) and a more modern interior it thoroughly trounced the 4/72 in reviews of the period.

When an automatic 4/72 was tested by The Motor magazine in 1962 they recorded a top speed of 81.3 mph (130.8 km/h), acceleration from 0-60 mph (97 km/h) in 20.6 seconds and a fuel consumption of 26.5 miles per imperial gallon (10.7 L/100 km; 22.1 mpg_{‑US}). The test car cost £1186 including taxes. The manual car was £1087

The 4/72 was sold as the Riley 1500 in Argentina and as the Riley Comet in Austria.

=== On the road ===
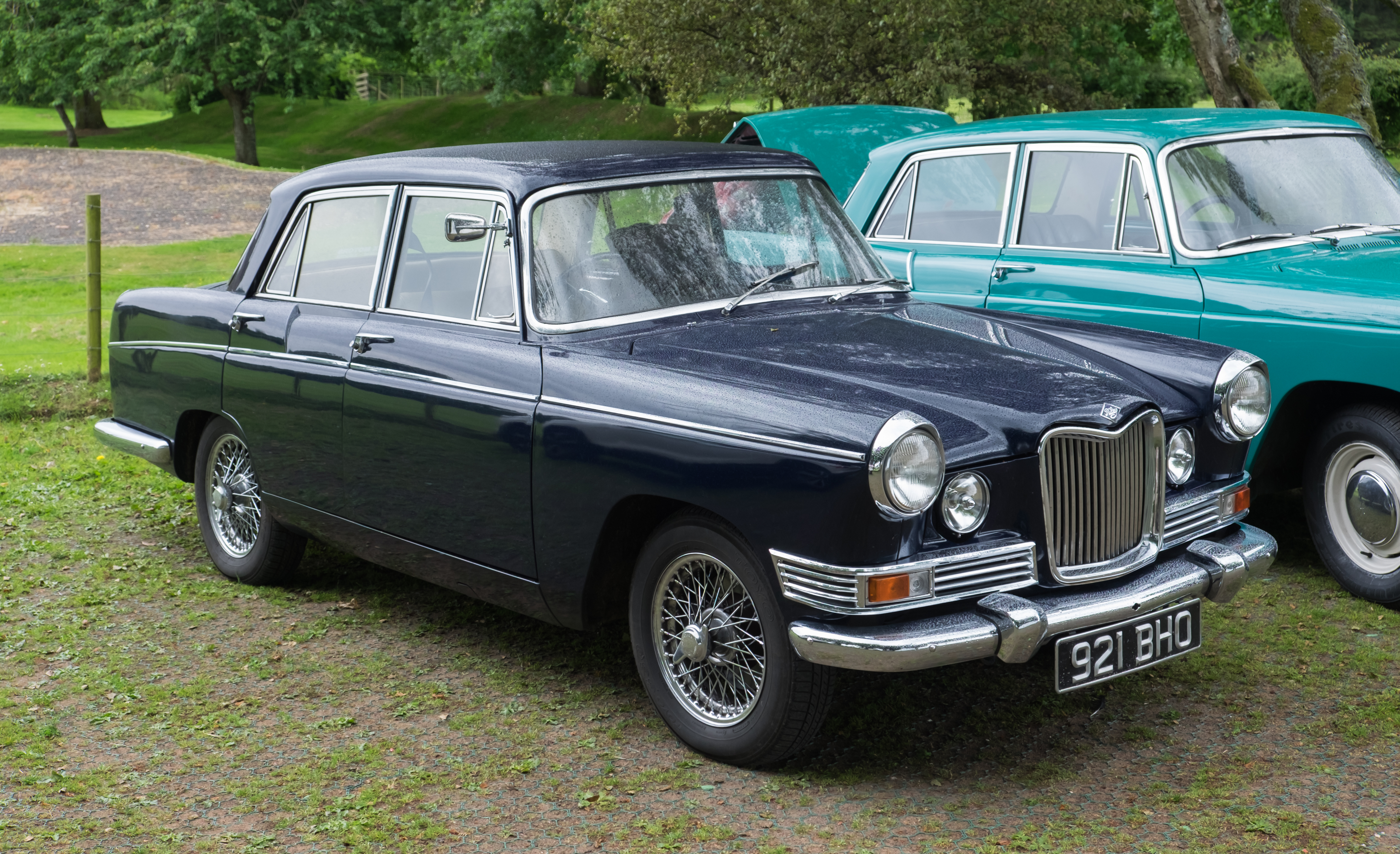
1961 Riley Riviera, a low-volume approved conversion of the 4/68 by Wessex Motors of Salisbury

In October 1962, Britain's Consumers' Association published its fourth Which? car supplement to their magazine. The Riley had been compared with Fiat 1500, Peugeot 403B, Ford Taunus 17M and VW 1500 and the British Sunbeam Rapier. The association reported that the Peugeot and the German Ford had the most virtues and fewest vices.

The report noted that its most severe criticism of all was of the Riley's handling, with increased speed it changed from understeering to oversteering. "It was not a car in which our testers drove with much confidence or pleasure". The Riley's braking system was considered to have more limitations than the other cars' systems.

== Manufacture in Argentina ==
Another related car was the 1960–1966 Siam Di Tella of Argentina, they were externally similar to the Riley 4 family, but with the Austin Cambridge rear body shape rather than the Riley's fins. . There was the sedan Di Tella 1500, the station wagon Di Tella Traveller and the pick-up (never produced in England) Di Tella Argenta. All of them were fitted with the 1489cc engine and 4 speed manual column change. The MG Magnette Mark IV was also produced but with the nomenclature Di Tella Magnette, both in 1489cc and 1622cc forms.
