= Riley Motor =

British motorcar and bicycle manufacturer

The Riley Cycle Company Limited (1896–1912) Riley (Coventry) Limited (1912–1950) Riley Motors Limited (1950–1960)
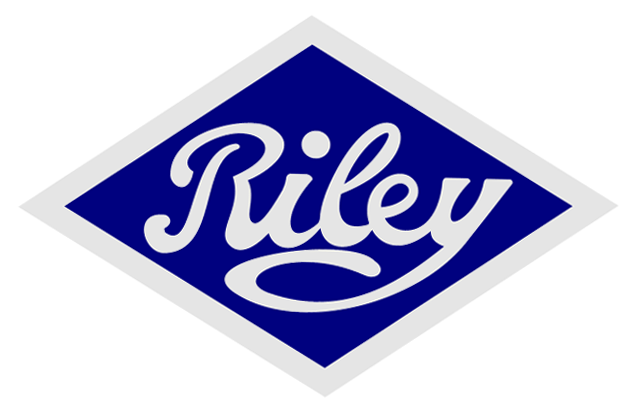
- Industry: Automotive
- Founded: 1896 as The Riley Cycle Company
- Fate: Acquired by William Morris in 1938 thereafter with Morris Motors Limited
- Successor: Nuffield Organization
- Headquarters: Coventry, England, UK
- Key people: William Riley (1851–1944); William Victor Riley (1876–1958); Allan Riley (c.1880– ) Percy Riley (1882–1941); Stanley Riley (c.1889–1952); Cecil Riley (c. 1895– )

Riley (Note: Information extracted from Notice issued in compliance with the Regulations of the Committee of The Stock Exchange, London (with regard to the issue of 150,000 Preference Shares of £1 each on 17 January 1934). The Company was incorporated in England on 25 June 1896 under the name The Riley Cycle Company Limited, changed to Riley (Coventry) Limited on 30 March 1912. In and around the year 1927 closer working arrangements were made between the Company and the Riley Engine Company and the Midland Motor Body Company whereby the designing and manufacturing resources of the three businesses were pooled. (During 1932) these two associated concerns were absorbed by the Company which became a completely self-contained manufacturing unit on modern lines. The Company's works at Coventry and Hendon cover a combined area of 16½ acres, in addition to which the Company owns adjoining land at Coventry of approximately 6 acres. About 2,200 workpeople are regularly employed. Riley (Coventry) Limited. The Times, Thursday, 18 January 1934; pg. 18; Issue 46655) was a British motorcar and bicycle manufacturer from 1890. Riley became part of the Nuffield Organization in 1938 and was merged into the British Leyland Motor Corporation in 1968. In July 1969, British Leyland announced the immediate end of Riley production, although 1969 was a difficult year for the UK automotive industry and many cars from Riley's inventory may have been first registered in 1970.

Today, the Riley trademark is owned by BMW.

== Riley Cycle Company ==
The business began as the Bonnick Cycle Company of Coventry, England. In 1890 during the pedal cycle craze that swept Britain at the end of the 19th century William Riley Jr. who had interests in the textile industry purchased the business and in 1896 incorporated a company to own it named The Riley Cycle Company Limited. Later, cycle gear maker Sturmey Archer was added to the portfolio. Riley's middle son, Percy, left school in the same year and soon began to dabble in automobiles.

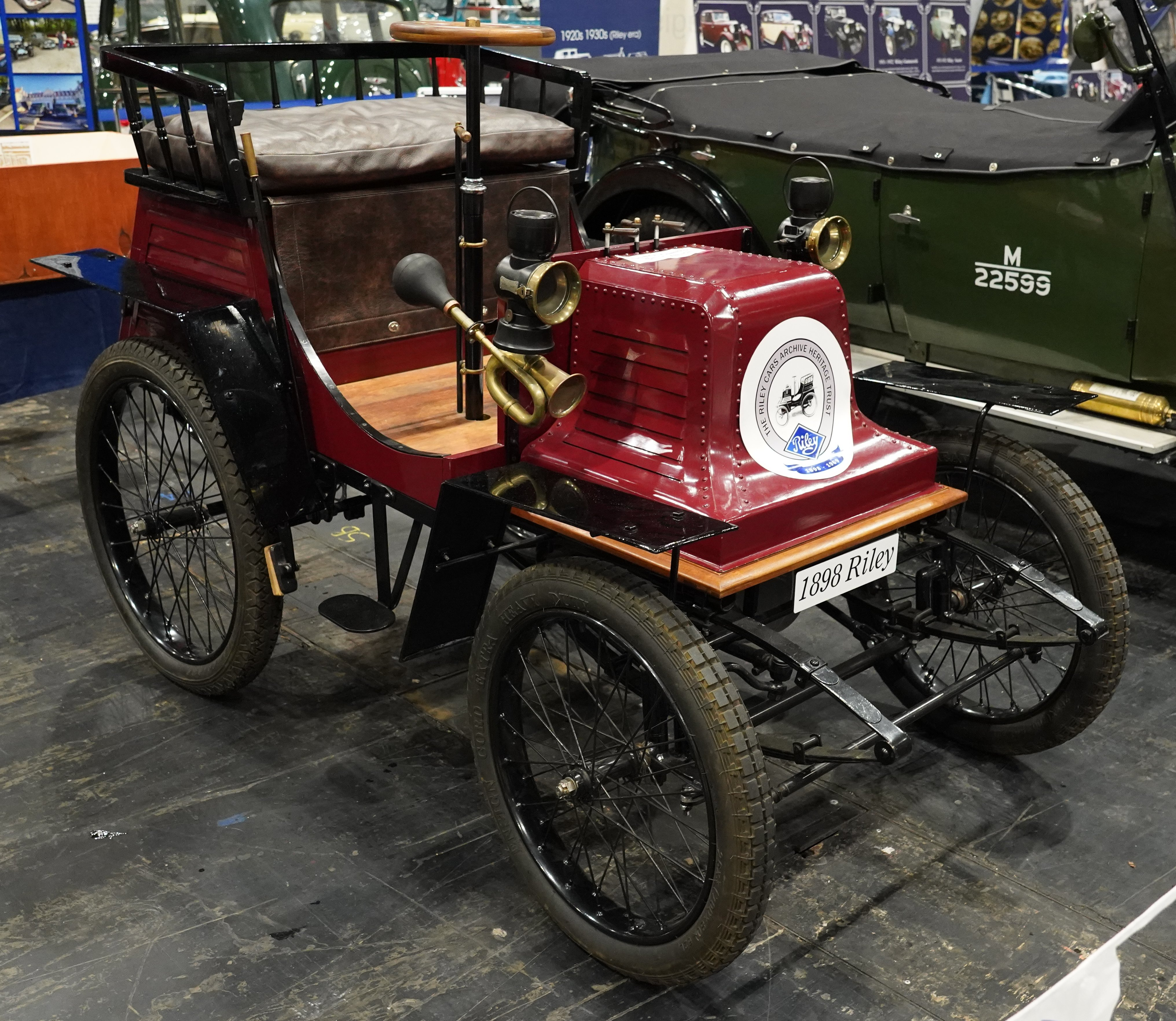
Replica of the 1898 first Riley he built at age 16.

He built his first car at 16, in 1898, secretly, because his father did not approve. It featured the first mechanically operated inlet valve. By 1899, Percy Riley had moved from producing motorcycles to his first prototype four-wheeled quadricycle. Little is known about Percy Riley's first motor car. It is, however, well attested that the engine featured mechanically operated cylinder valves at a time when other engines depended on the vacuum effect of the descending piston to suck the inlet valve(s) open. That was demonstrated some years later when Benz developed and patented a mechanically operated inlet valve process of their own but were unable to collect royalties on their system from British companies; the courts were persuaded that the system used by British auto-makers was based on the one pioneered by Percy, which had comfortably anticipated equivalent developments in Germany. In 1900, Riley sold a single three-wheeled automobile. Meanwhile, the elder of the Riley brothers, Victor Riley, although supportive of his brother's embryonic motor-car enterprise, devoted his energies to the core bicycle business.

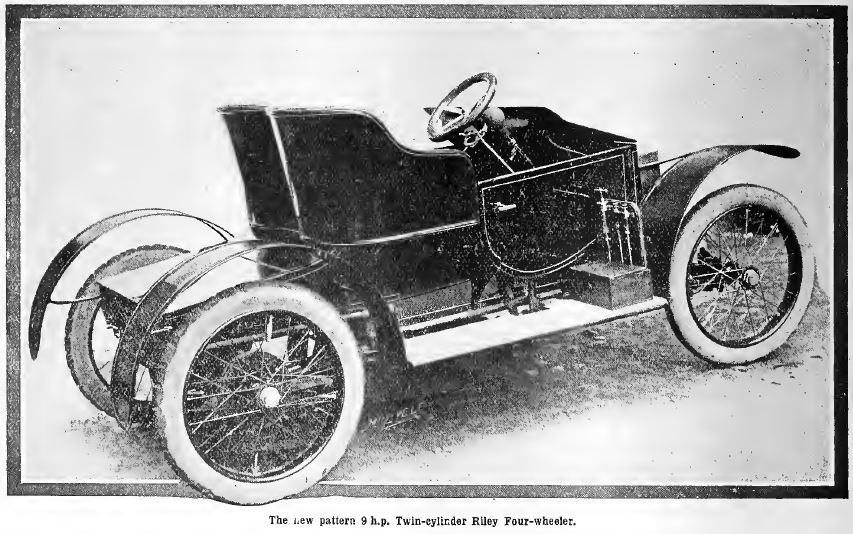
The 4-wheel Riley exhibited at the 1907 Birmingham Show by Riley Cycles Ltd

Riley's founder William Riley remained resolutely opposed to diverting the resources of his bicycle business into motor cars, and in 1902 three of his sons, Victor, Percy and younger brother Allan Riley pooled resources, borrowed a necessary balancing amount from their mother and in 1903 established the separate Riley Engine Company, also in Coventry. A few years later the other two Riley brothers, Stanley and Cecil, having left school joined their elder brothers in the business. At first, the Riley Engine Company simply supplied engines for Riley motorcycles and also to Singer, a newly emerging motorcycle manufacturer in the area, but the Riley Engine Company soon began to focus on four-wheeled automobiles. Their Vee-Twin Tourer prototype, produced in 1905, can be considered the first proper Riley car. The Riley Engine Company expanded the next year. William Riley reversed his former opposition to his sons' preference for motorised vehicles and Riley Cycle halted motorcycle production in 1907 to focus on automobiles. Bicycle production also ceased in 1911.

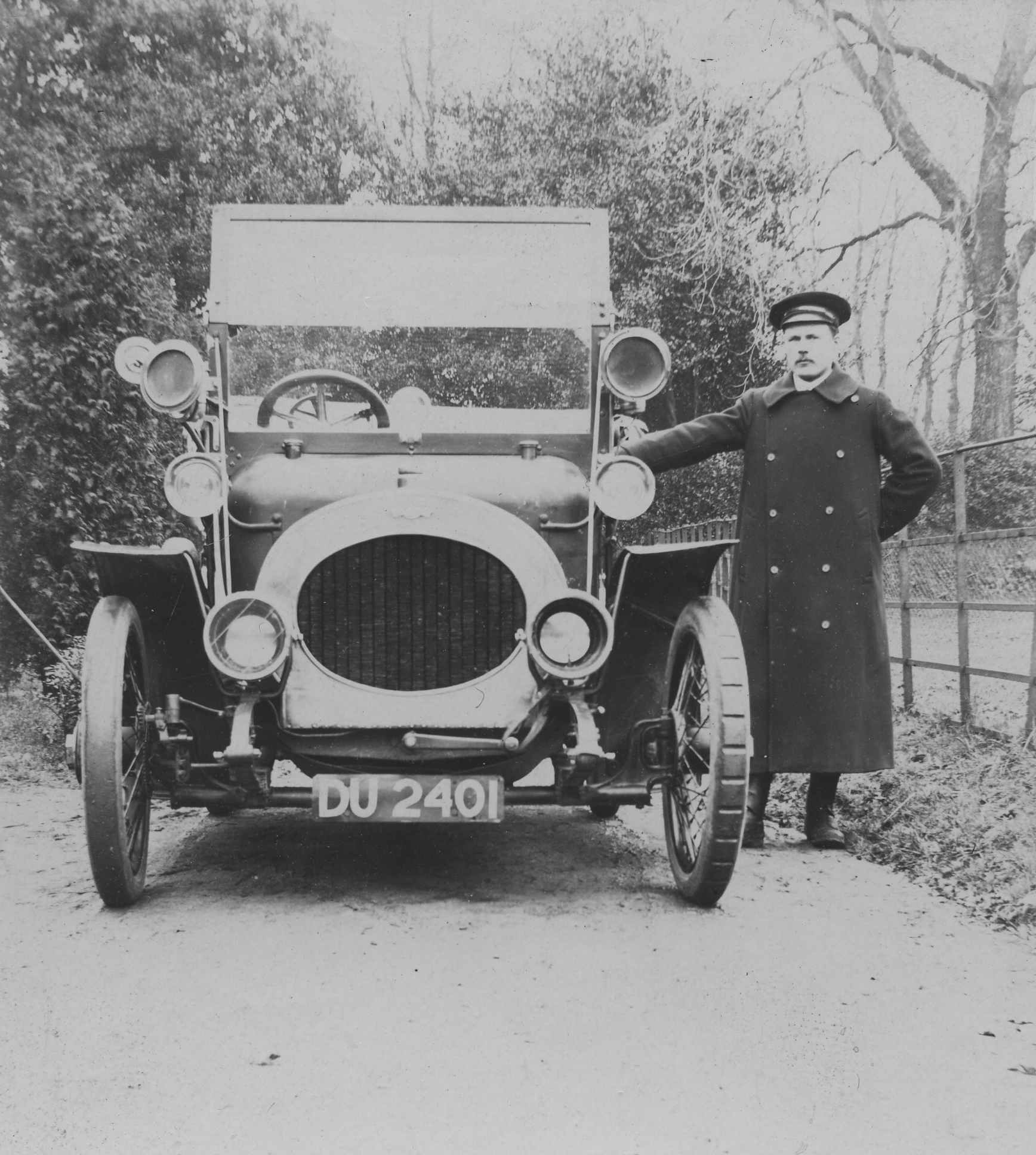
12/18 c. 1910 and chauffeur for William Beveridge

In 1912, the Riley Cycle Company changed its name to Riley (Coventry) Limited as William Riley focused it on becoming a wire-spoked wheel supplier for the burgeoning motor industry, the detachable wheel having been invented (and patented) by Percy and distributed to over 180 motor manufacturers, and by 1912 the father's business had also dropped automobile manufacture in order to concentrate capacity and resources on the wheels. Exploitation of this new and rapidly expanding lucrative business sector made commercial sense for William Riley, but the abandonment of his motorcycle and then of his automobile business which had been the principal customer for his sons' Riley Engine Company enforced a rethink on the engine business.

== Riley (Coventry) Limited ==
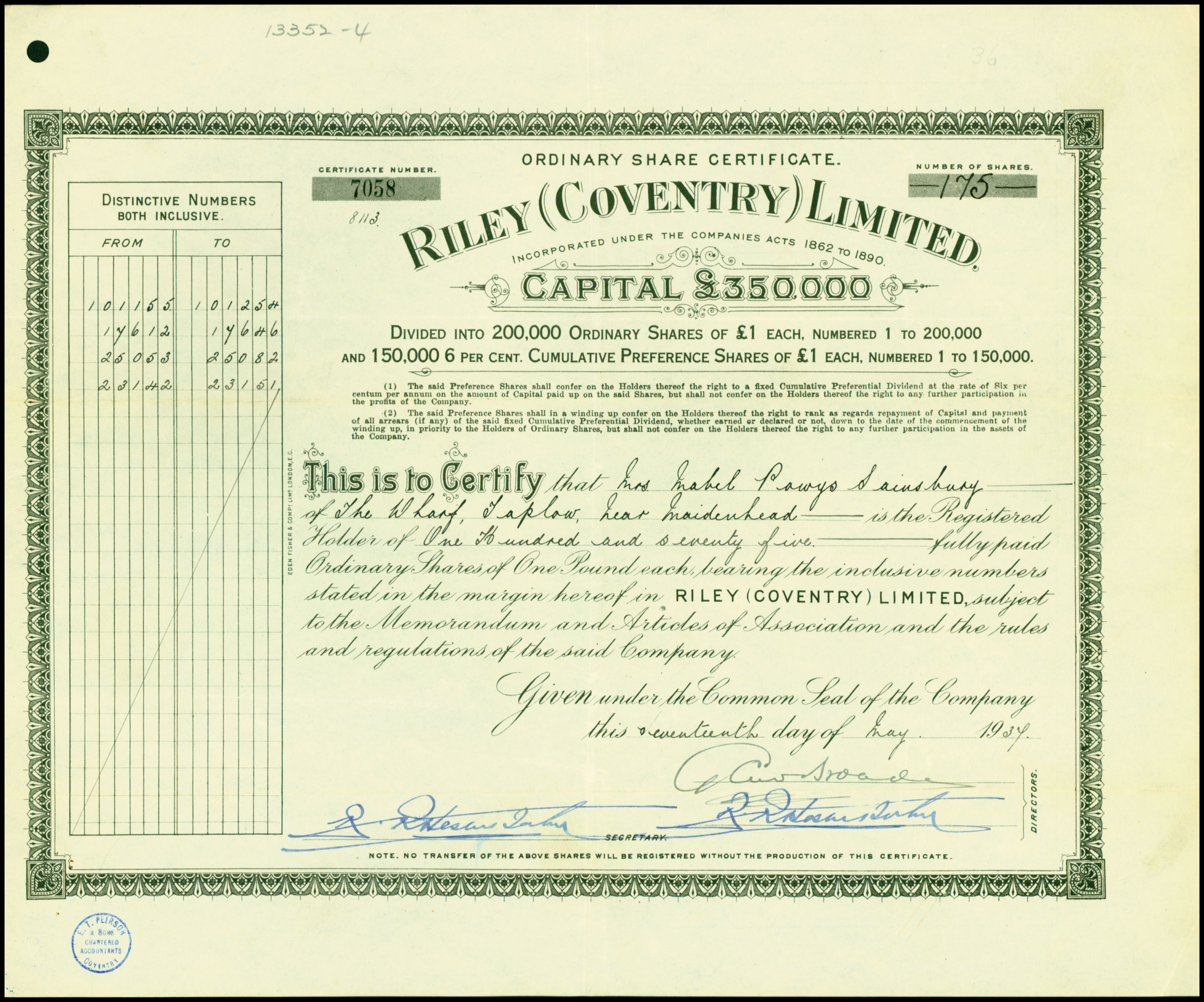
Riley (Coventry) Limited share certificate issued 17 May 1937

In early 1913, Percy was joined by three of his brothers (Victor, Stanley, and Allan) to focus on manufacturing entire automobiles. The works was located near Percy's Riley Engine Company. The first new model, the 17/30, was introduced at the London Motor Show that year. Soon afterwards, Stanley Riley founded yet another business, the Nero Engine Company, to produce his own 4-cylinder 10 hp (7.5 kW) car. Riley also began manufacturing aeroplane engines and became a key supplier in Britain's buildup for World War I.

In 1918, after the war, the Riley companies were restructured. Nero joined Riley (Coventry) as the sole producer of automobiles. Riley Motor Manufacturing under the control of Allan Riley became Midland Motor Bodies, a coachbuilder for Riley. Riley Engine Company continued under Percy as the engine supplier. At this time, Riley's blue diamond badge, designed by Harry Rush, also appeared. The motto was "As old as the industry, as modern as the hour."

Riley grew rapidly through the 1920s and 1930s. The Riley Engine Company produced 4-, 6-, and 8-cylinder engines, while Midland built more than a dozen different bodies. Riley models at this time included:

- Saloons: Adelphi, 'Continental'(Close-coupled Touring Saloon), Deauville, Falcon, Kestrel, Mentone, Merlin, Monaco, Stelvio, Victor
- Coupes: Ascot, Lincock
- Tourers: Alpine, Lynx, Gamecock
- Sports: Brooklands, Imp, MPH, Sprite
- Limousines: Edinburgh, Winchester

Introduced in 1926 in a modest but innovatively-designed fabric bodied saloon, Percy Riley's small capacity Riley 9 engine was a high revving unit; ground-breaking and ahead of its time in many respects. It has been called the most significant engine development of the 1920s. It has hemispherical combustion chambers and inclined overhead valves, with twin camshafts set high in the cylinder block, and valves operated by short pushrods. This provided power and efficiency without the servicing complexity of an overhead camshaft layout. It soon attracted the attention of tuners and builders of 'specials' for sporting purposes. One such was engineer and driver J.G. Parry-Thomas, who conceived the Riley 'Brooklands' (at first called the '9' Speed Model) in his workshops at the Brooklands racing circuit in Surrey. After Parry-Thomas was killed during a land speed record attempt in 1927, his close collaborator Reid Railton stepped in to finish the job. Officially backed by Riley, the Brooklands, along with later developments and variations such as the 'Ulster' Imp, MPH, and Sprite, proved some of the most successful works and privateer racing cars of the late 1920s and early 1930s. At Le Mans in 1934, Rileys finished 2nd, 3rd, 5th, 6th, and 12th, winning the Rudge-Whitworth Cup, the Team Prize, two class awards, and the Ladies' Prize. Rileys also distinguished themselves at the Ulster TT, at Brooklands itself, and at smaller events like hill climbs, while providing a platform for the success of motorsports' first women racing drivers such as Kay Petre, Dorothy Champney and Joan Richmond. Another engineer and driver, Freddie Dixon, was responsible for extensive improvements to engine and chassis tuning, creating a number of 'specials' that exploited the basic Riley design still further, and contributed greatly to its success on the track.

For series production, the engine configuration was extended into a larger 12 horsepower '4', six-cylinder and even V8 versions, powering an increasingly confusing range of touring and sports cars. The soundness and longevity of the engine design is illustrated by Mike Hawthorn's early racing success after WW2 in pre-war Rileys, in particular his father's Sprite. By about 1936, however, the business had overextended, with too many models and few common parts, and the emergence of SS Cars at Coventry was a direct challenge. Disagreements between the Riley brothers about the future direction of the enterprise grew. Victor Riley had set up a new ultra-luxury concern, Autovia, to produce a V8 saloon and limousine to compete with Rolls-Royce. By contrast, Percy, however, did not favour an entry into the luxury market, and the Riley Engine Company had been renamed PR Motors to be a high-volume supplier of engines and components. The original intention of PR Motors was to produce a small car, but the outbreak of war, followed by Percy Riley's untimely death, put an end to this project. The rest of the Riley companies later became part of Nuffield and then BMC, but PR Motors remained independent. After the death of Percy Riley in 1941, his business began producing transmission components. It still exists today, producing marine and off-highway vehicle applications, as PRM Newage Limited based in Aldermans Green, Coventry. Percy's widow Norah ran his business for many years, and was Britain's businesswoman of the year in 1960.

Riley sports saloons and coupés
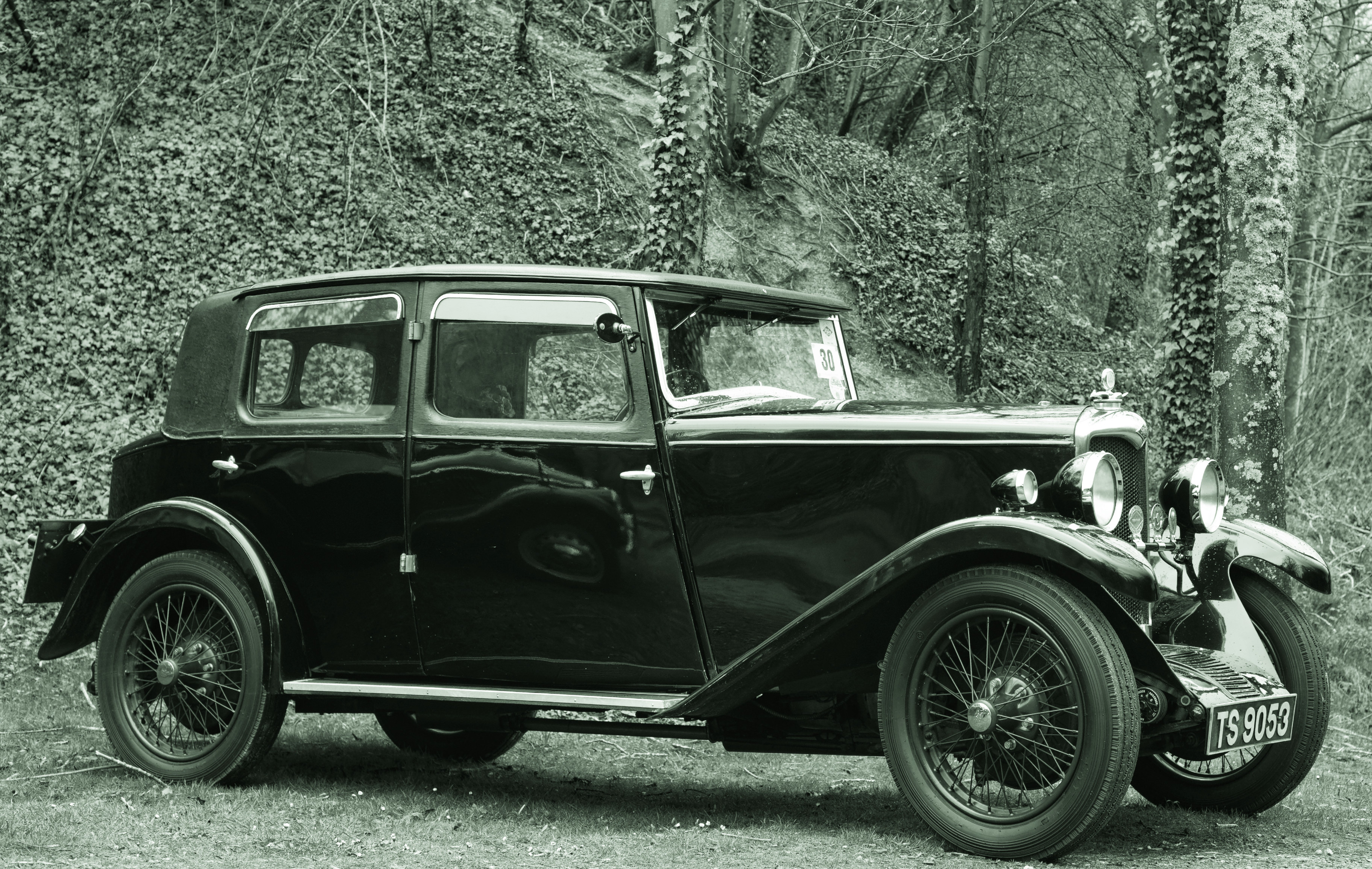
Nine Biarritz
4-door saloon 1930

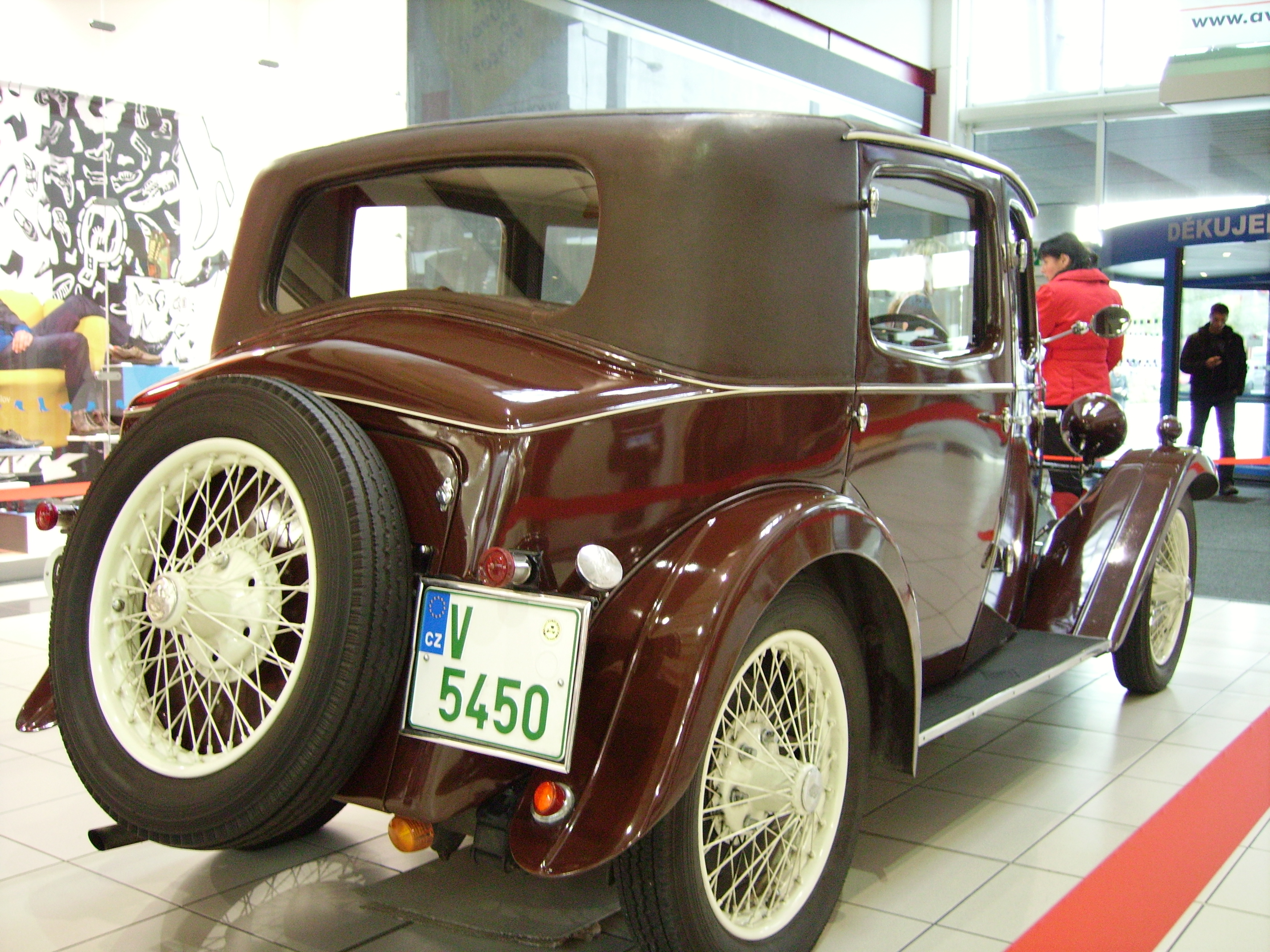
Nine Monaco
4-door saloon 1932

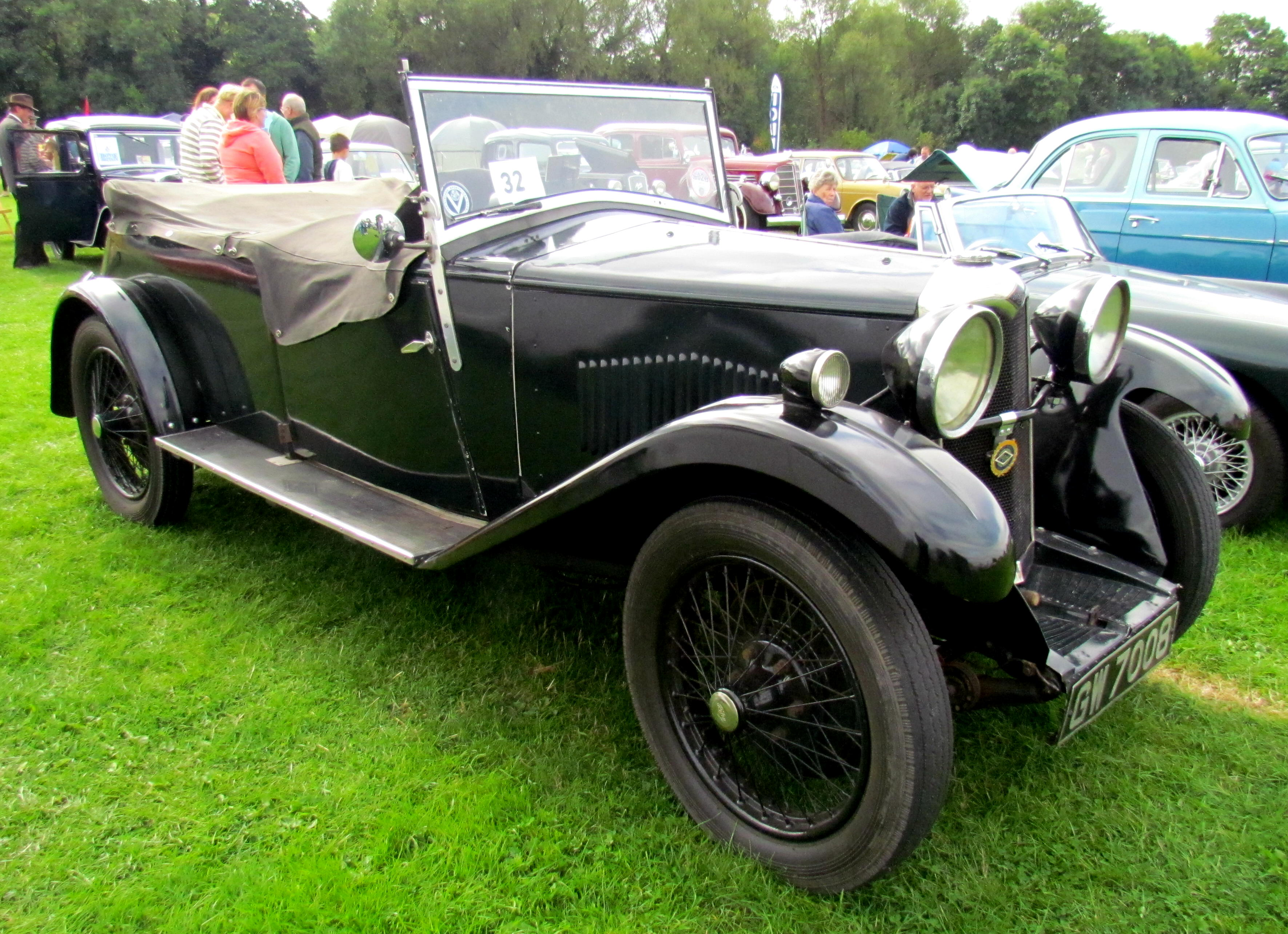
Nine Gamecock
2/4-str sports 1932

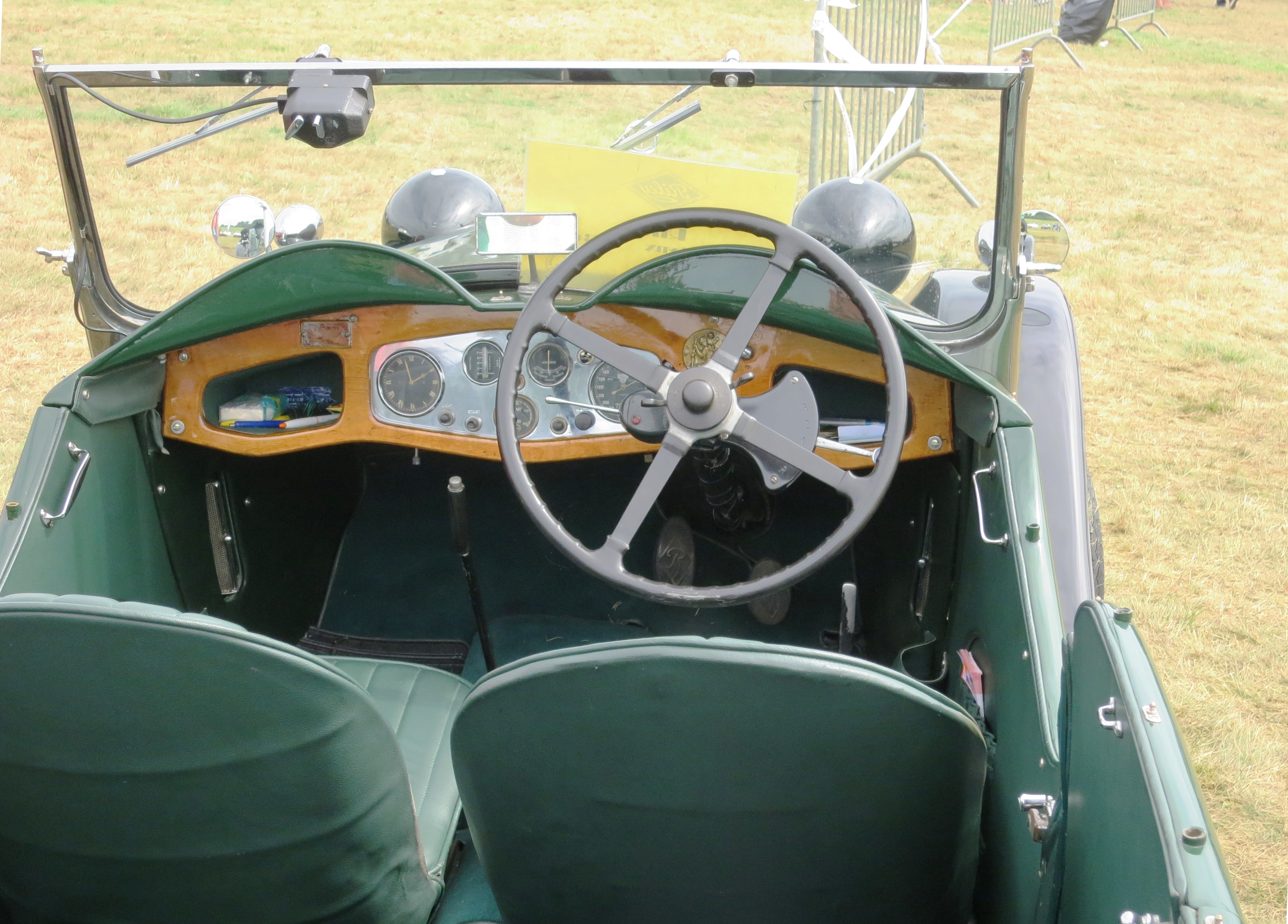
Nine Lynx
instrument panel

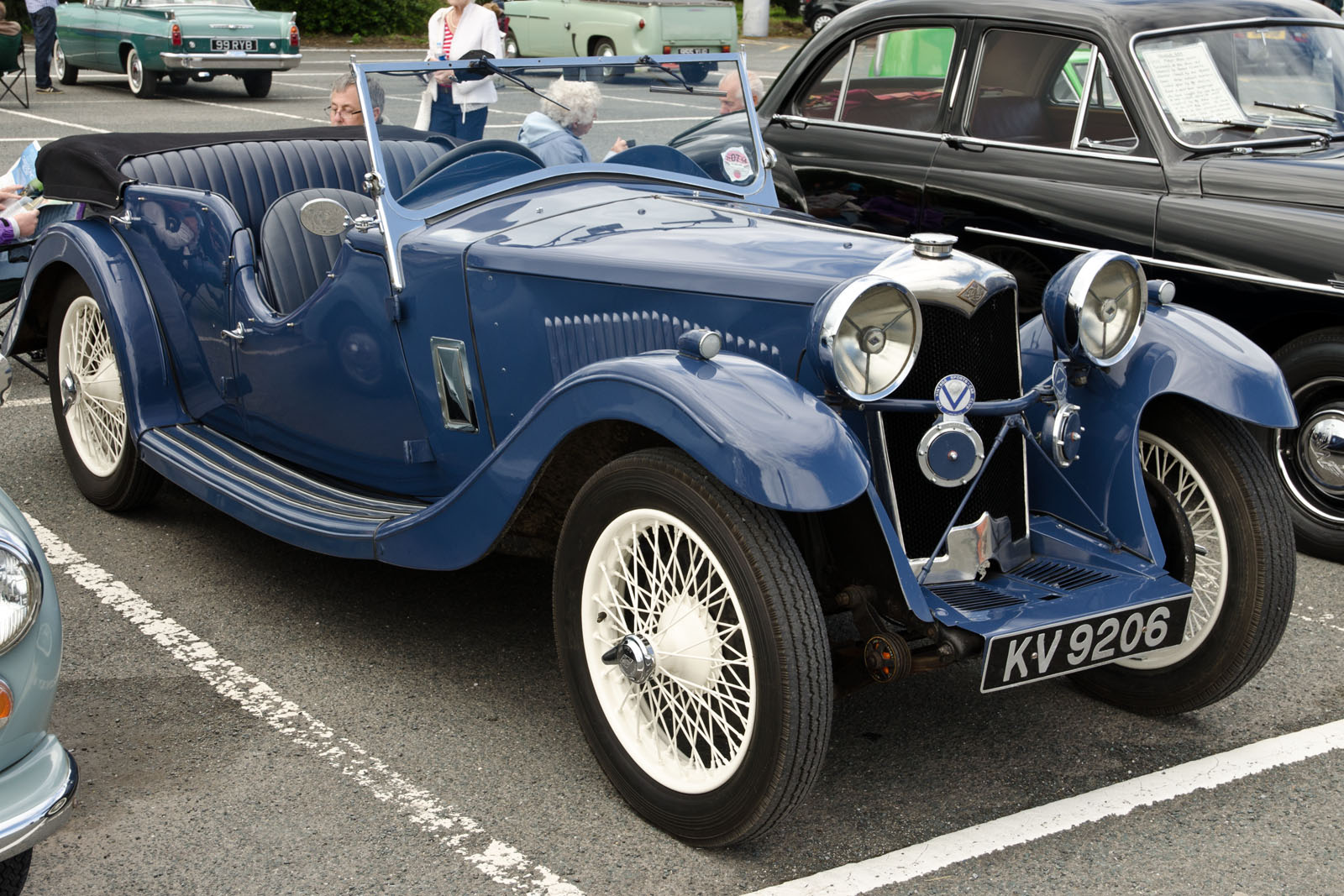
Nine Lynx
tourer 1934

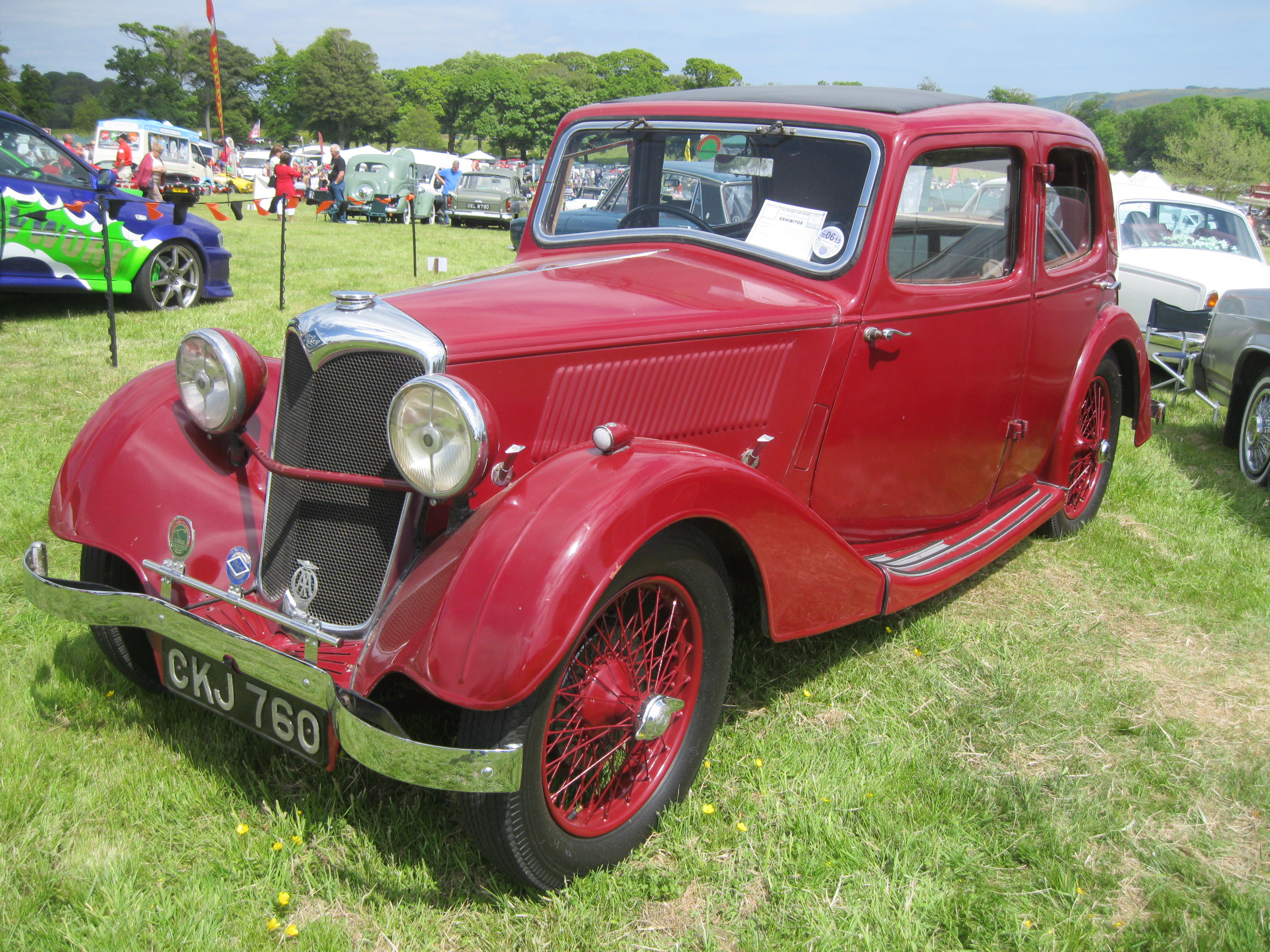
Nine Merlin
4-light saloon 1935

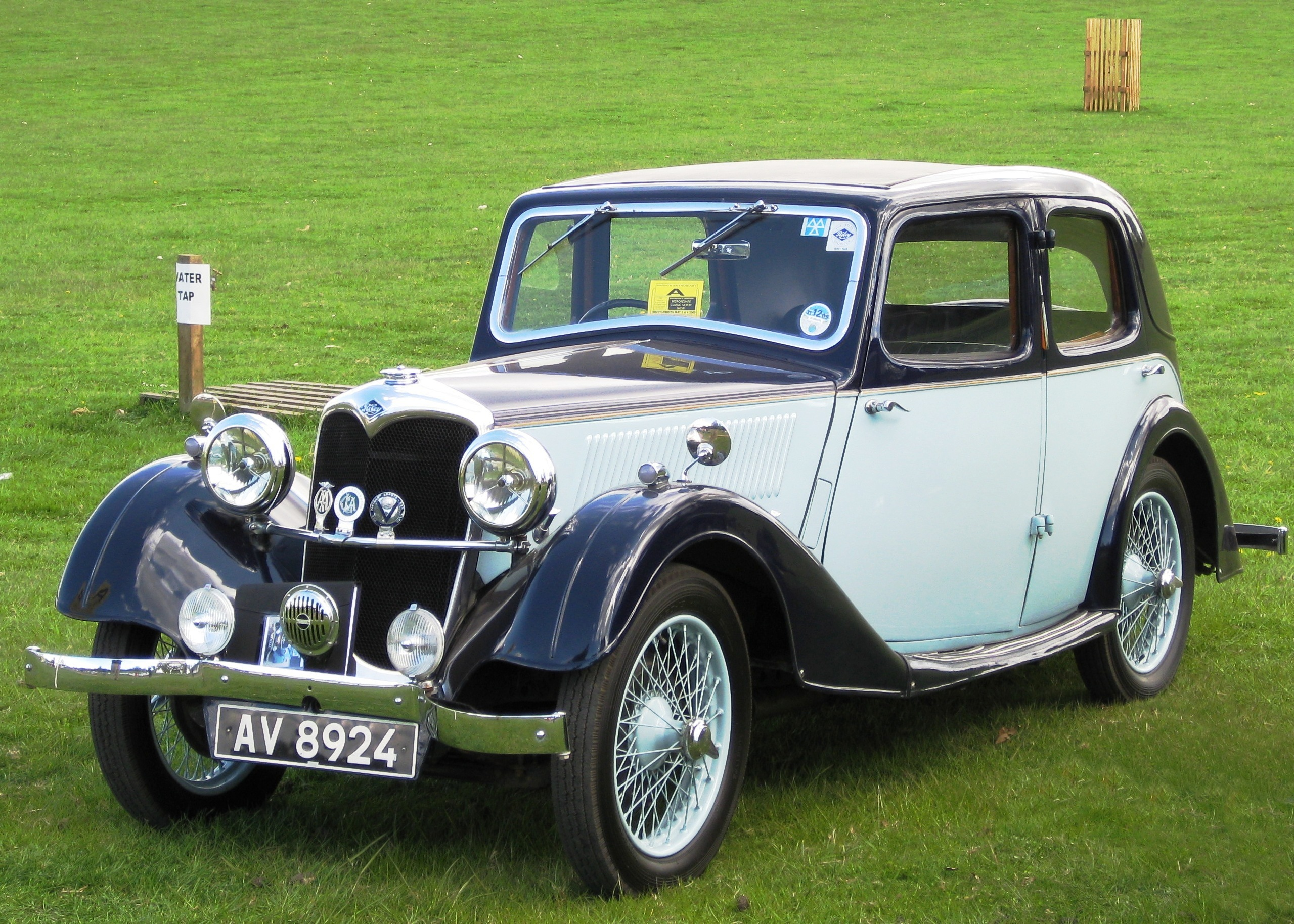
Nine Kestrel
4-light saloon 1934

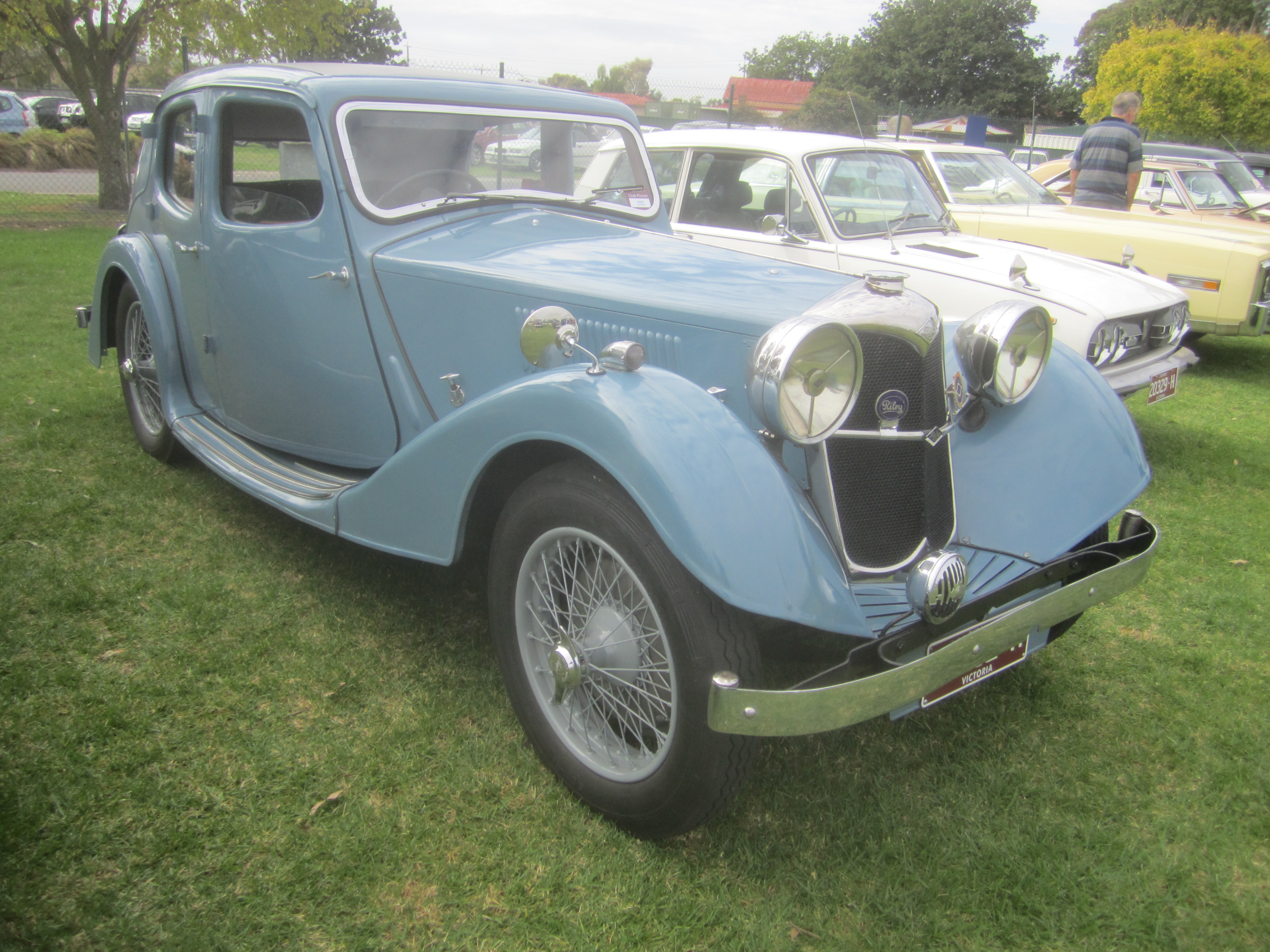
12/4 Kestrel
4-light saloon 1934

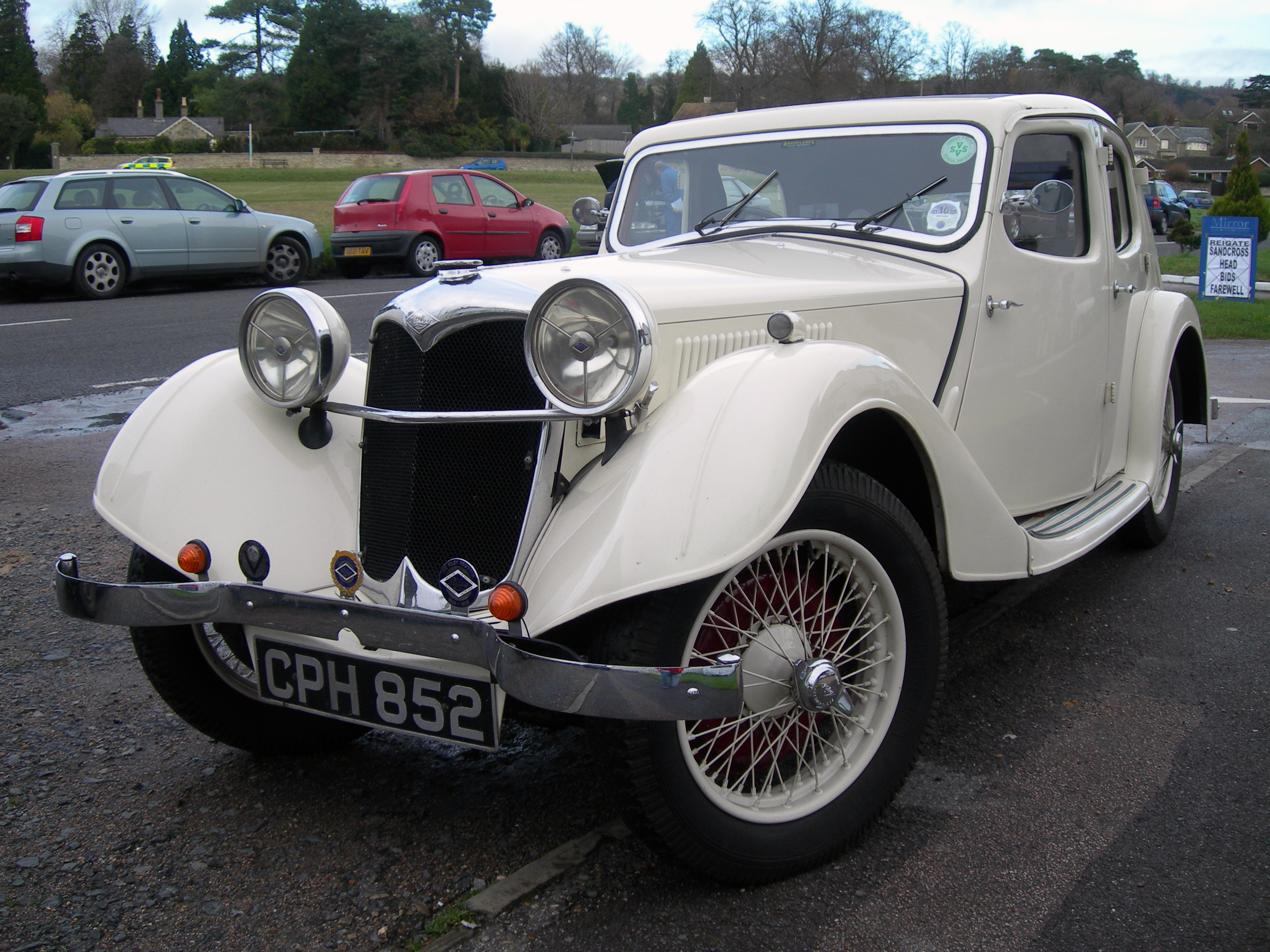
1½-litre Kestrel
4-light saloon 1935

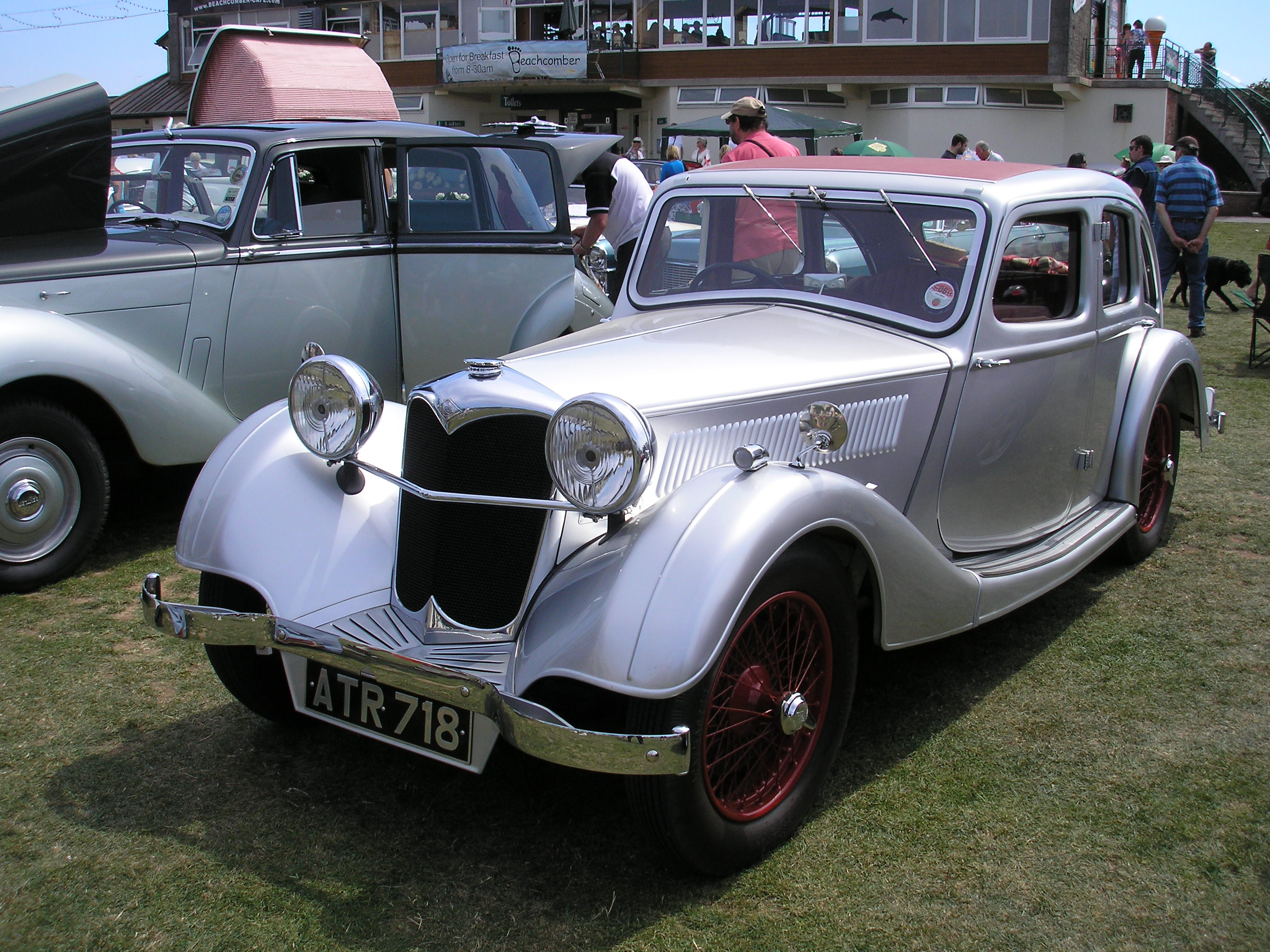
1½-litre Kestrel
6-light saloon 1938

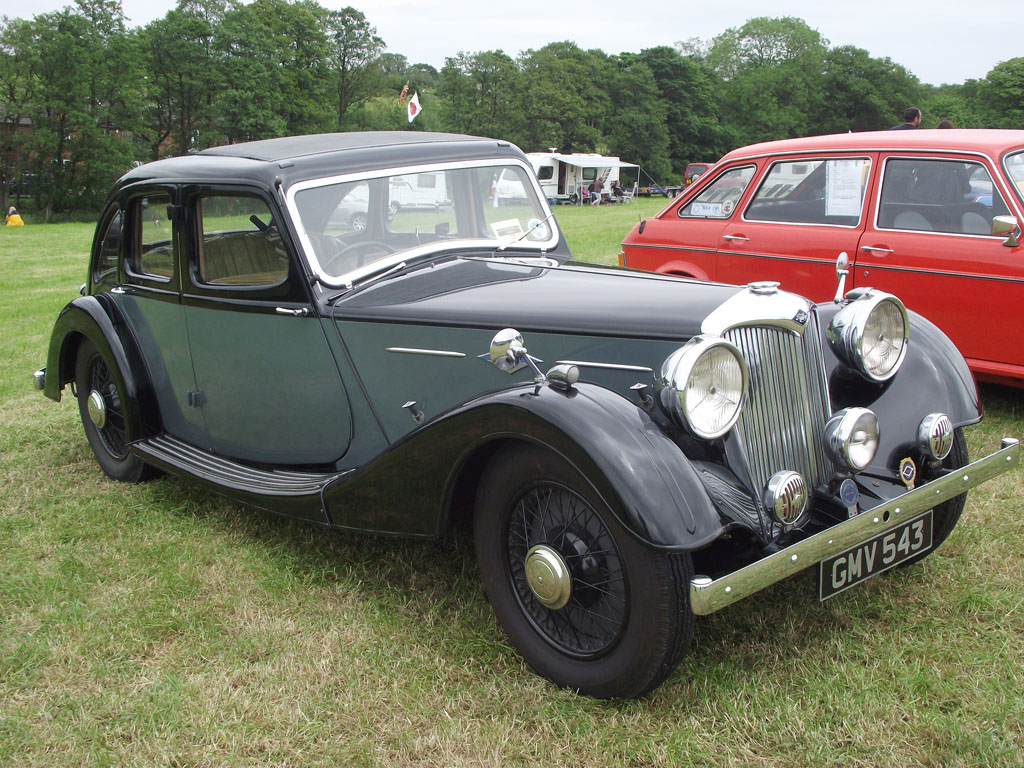
16/4 2½-litre Kestrel
6-light saloon 1937

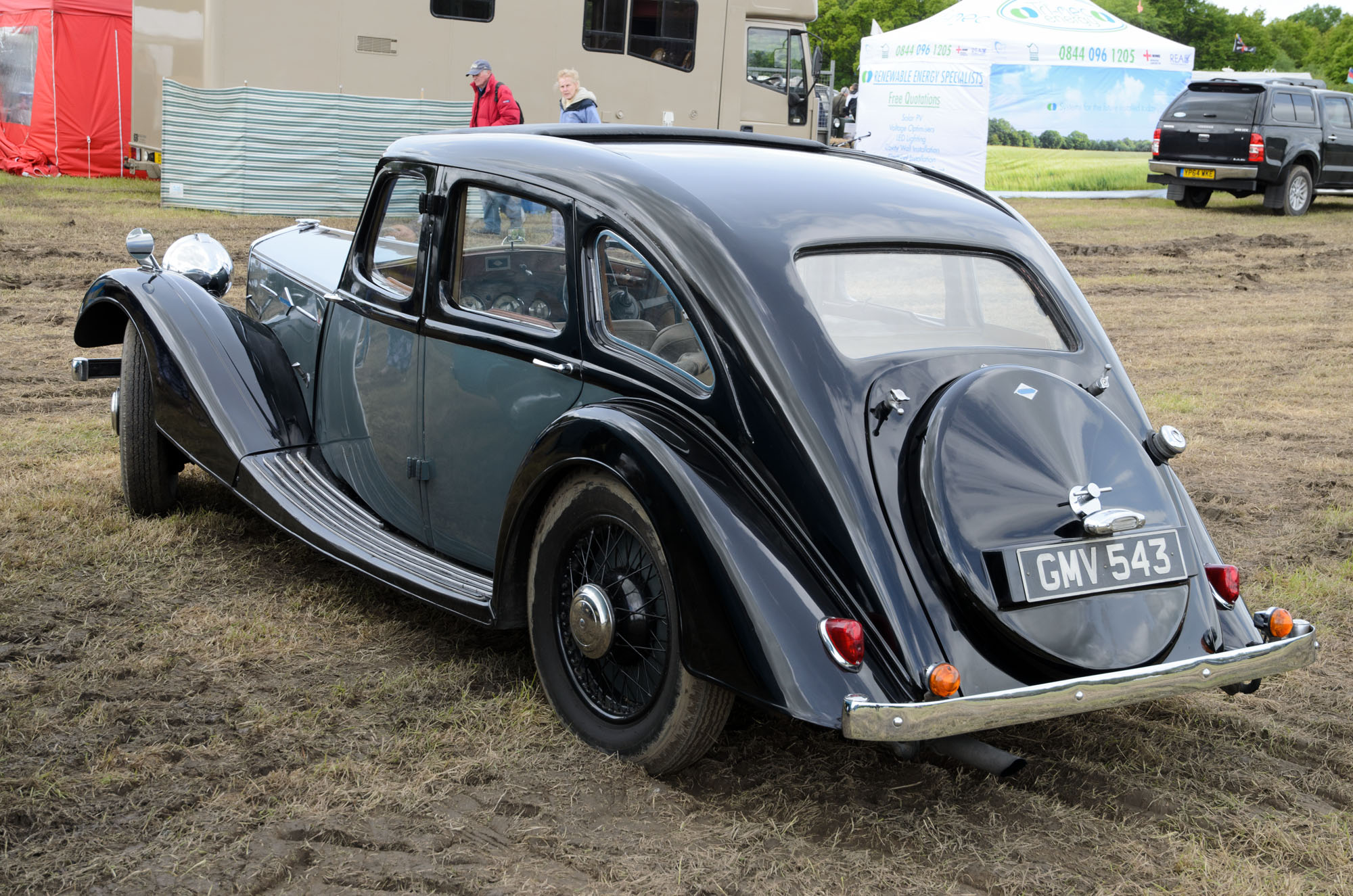
16/4 2½-litre Kestrel
6-light saloon 1937

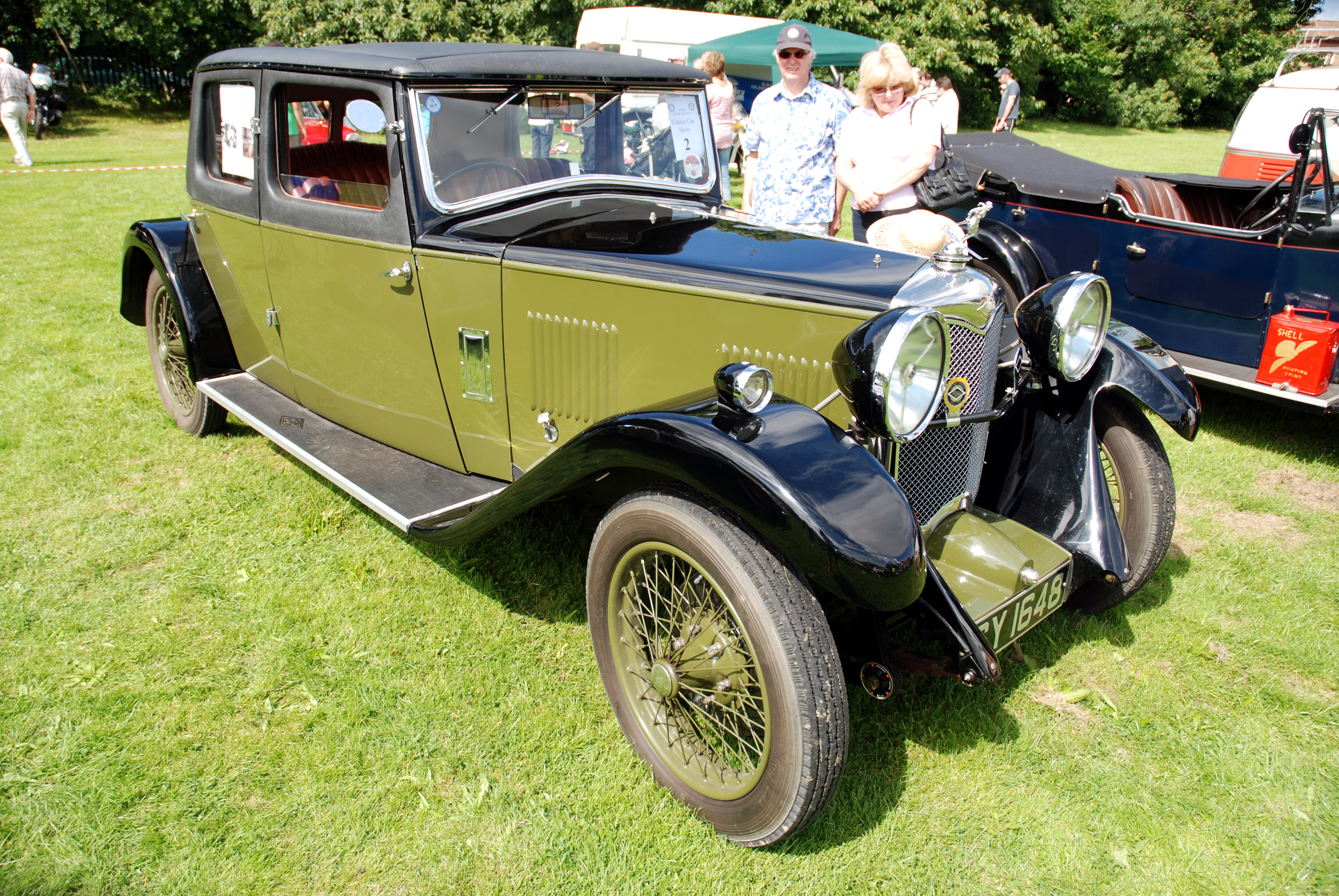
14/6 Lincock
fixed head coupé '34

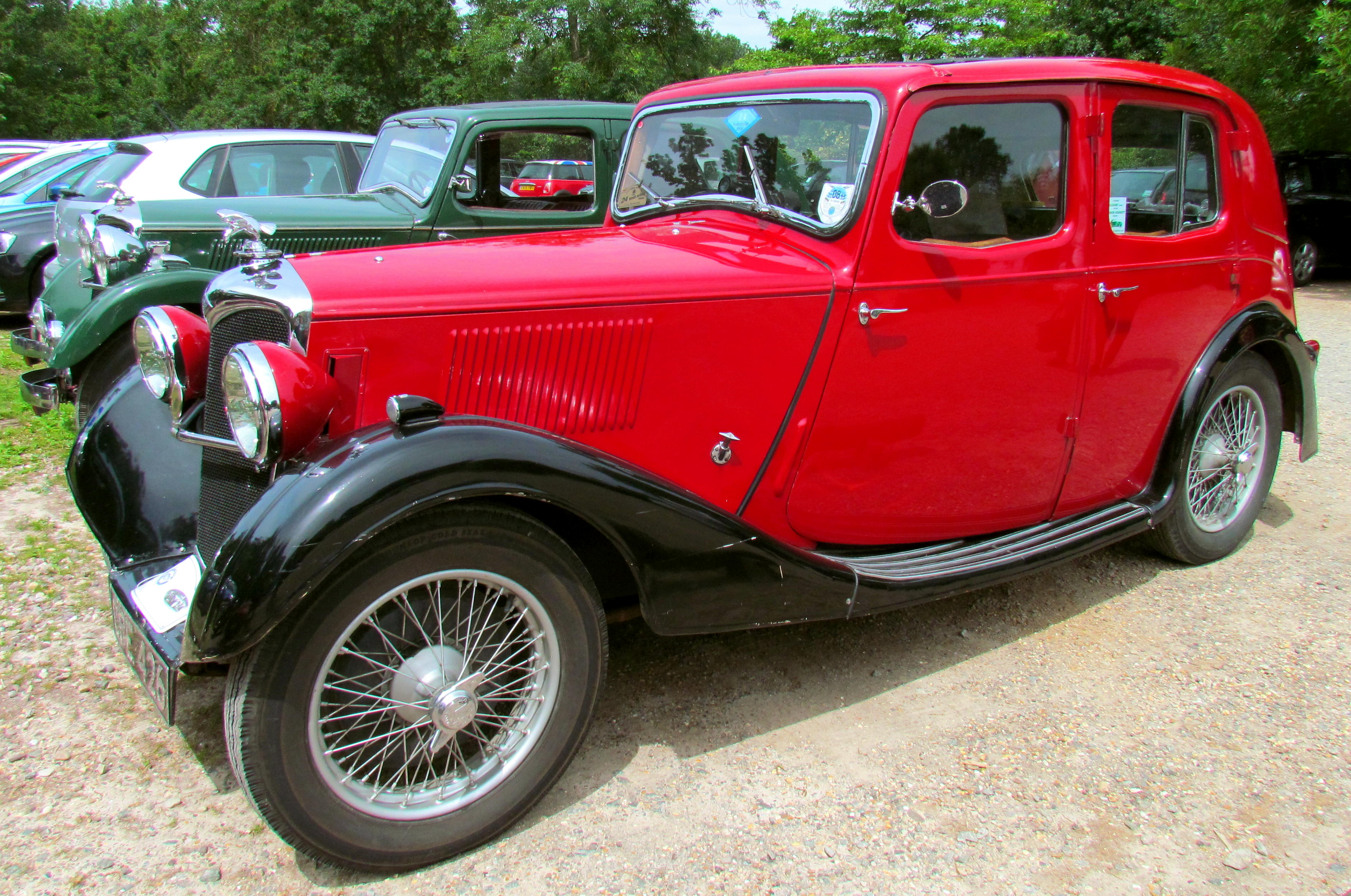
1½-litre Falcon
4-door saloon 1935

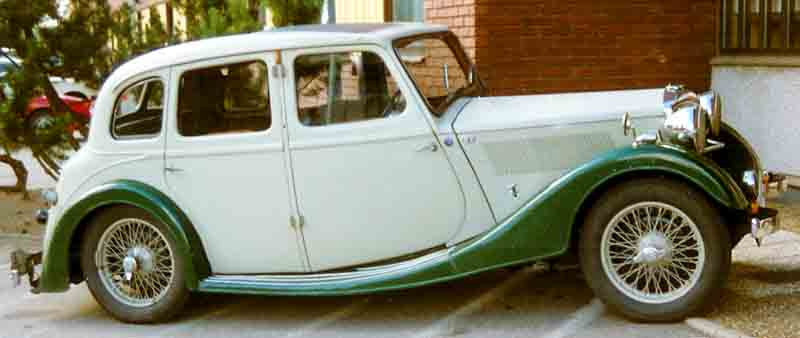
15/6 Adelphi
six-light Saloon 1935

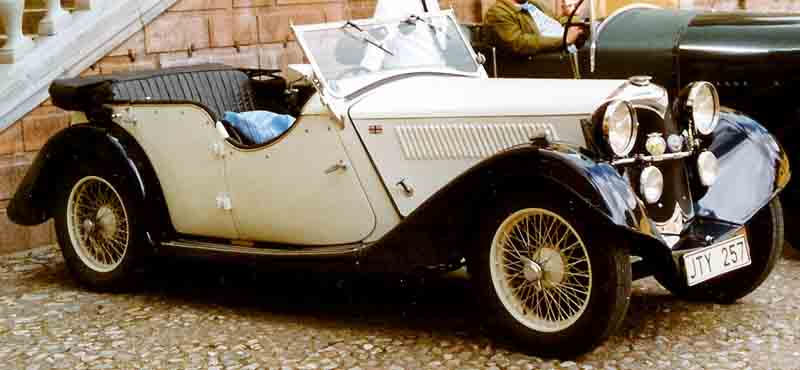
12/4 Lynx
sports tourer 1937

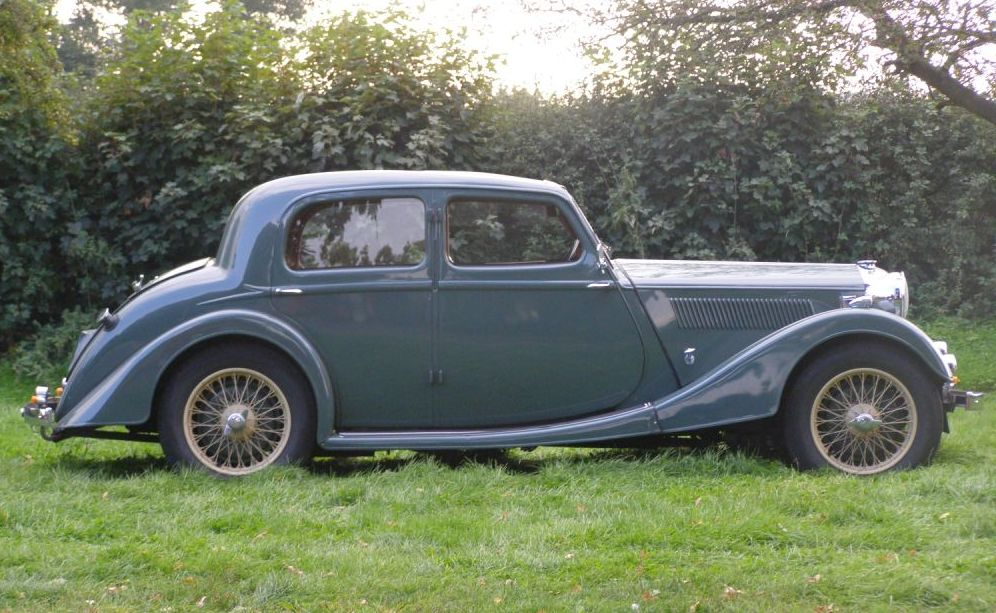
12/4 Continental
sports saloon 1937

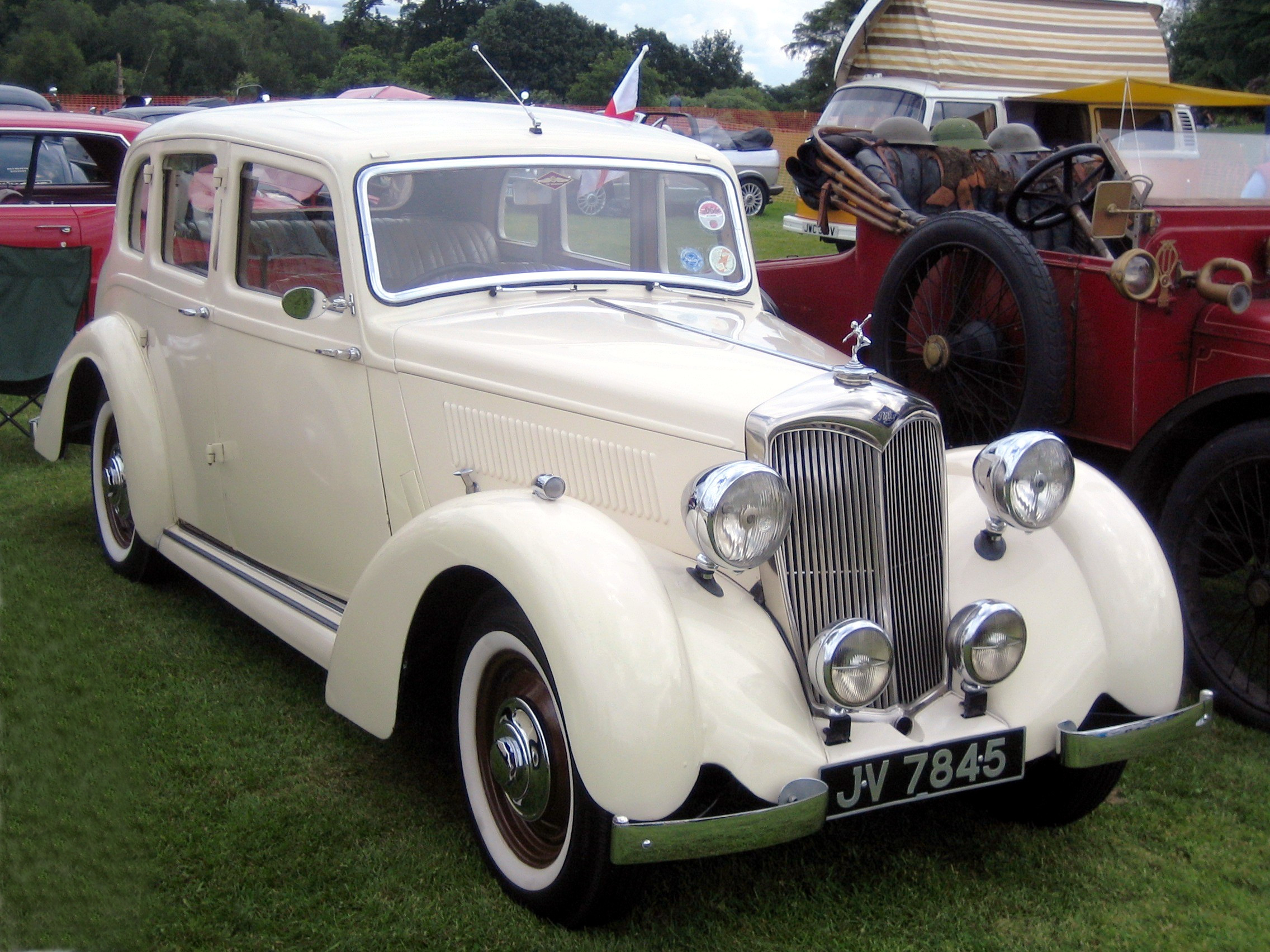
Twelve
six-light saloon 1939
First Nuffield Model
Riley racing and sports cars
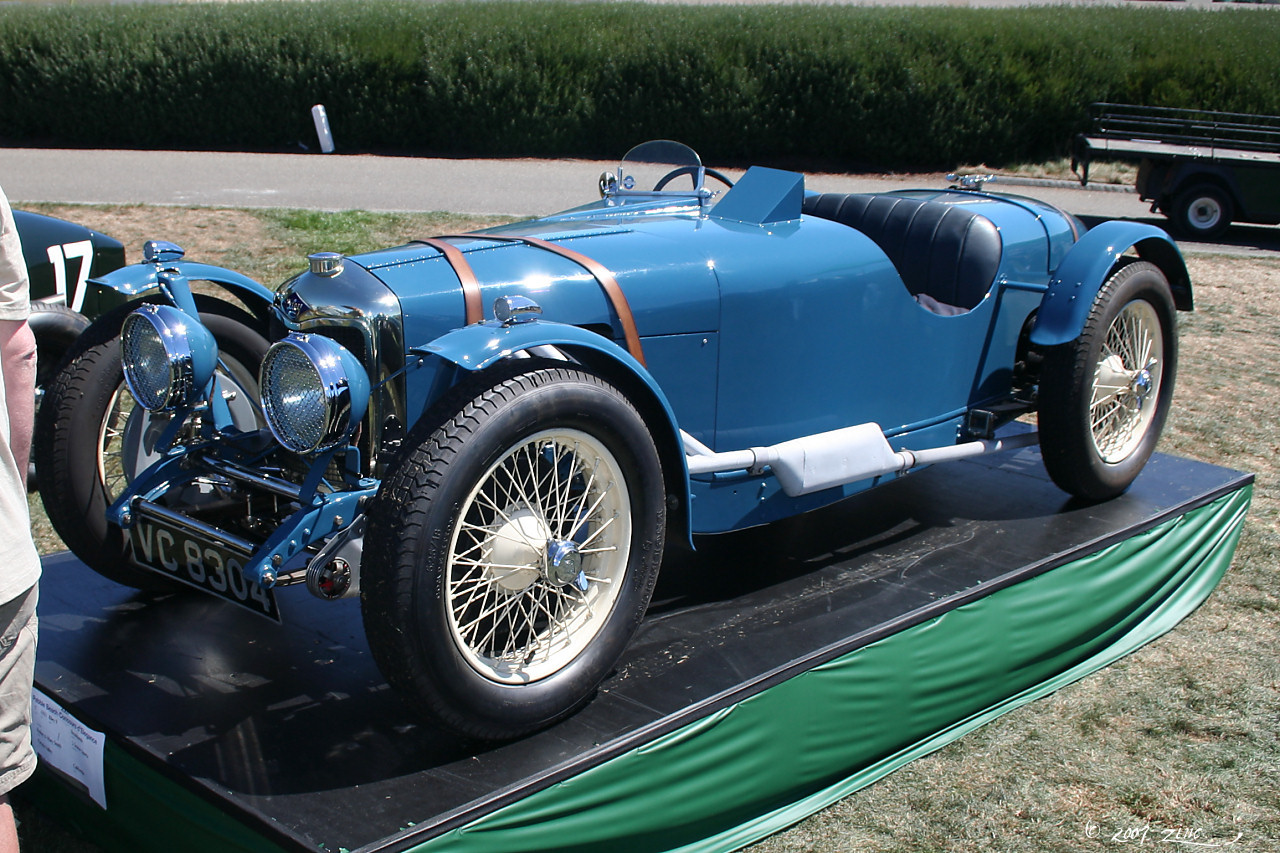
Nine Brooklands
open 2-seater 1931

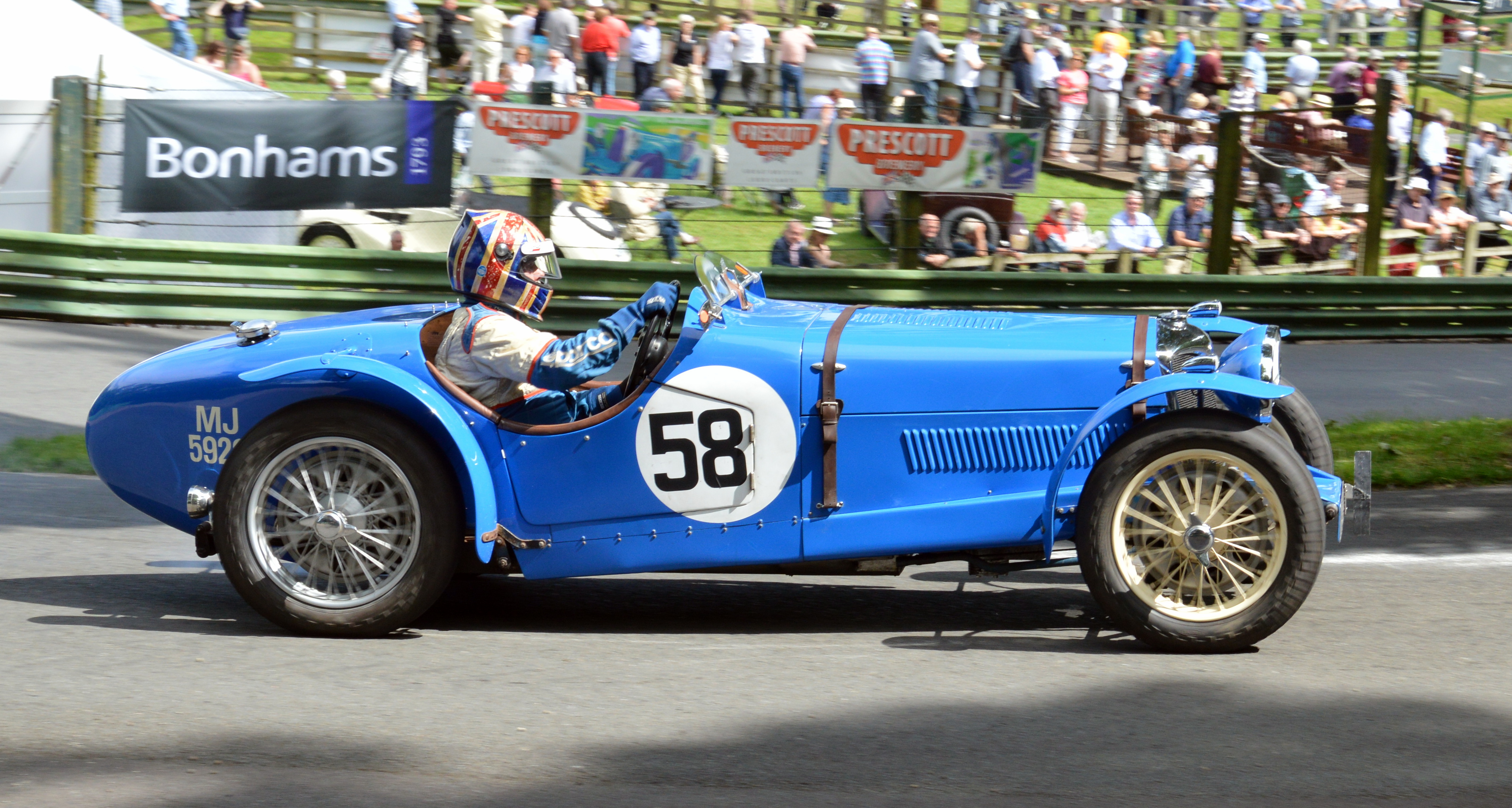
1½-litre Sprite
TT Replica 1935

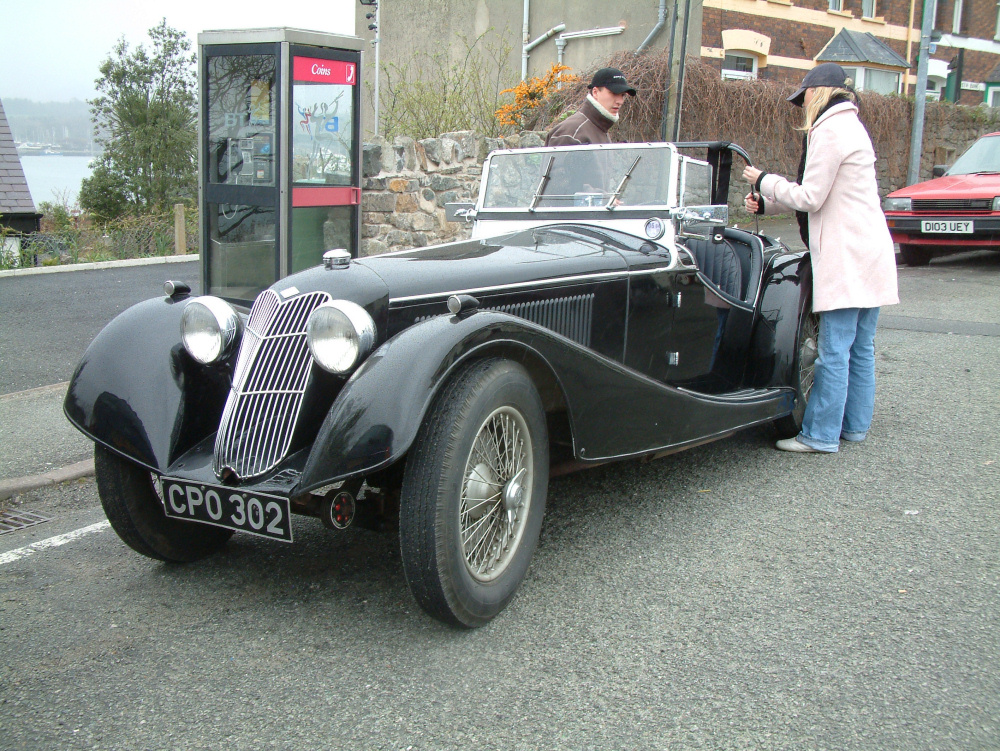
1½-litre Sprite
2-seater sports 1936

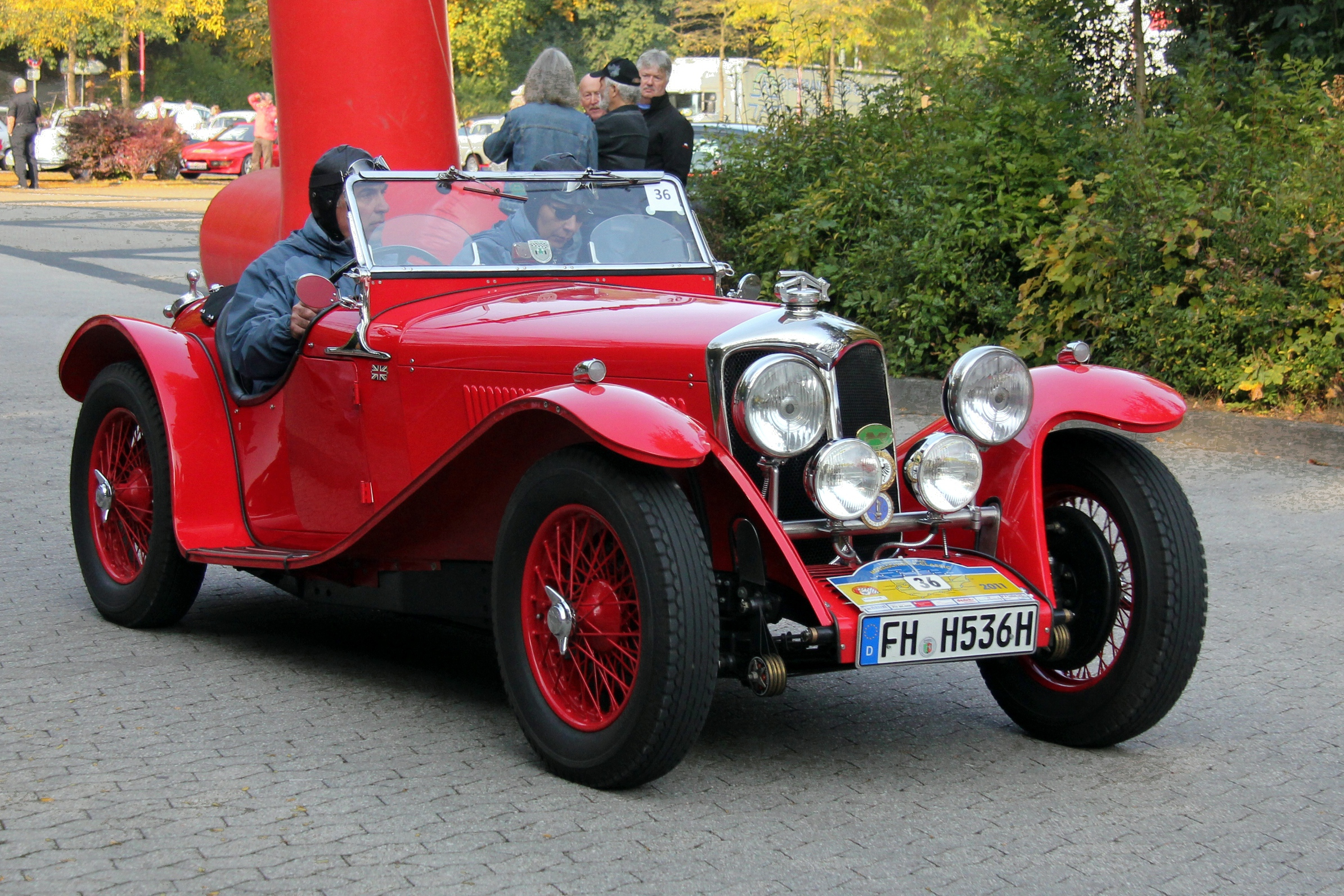
Nine MPH
2-seater sports 1936

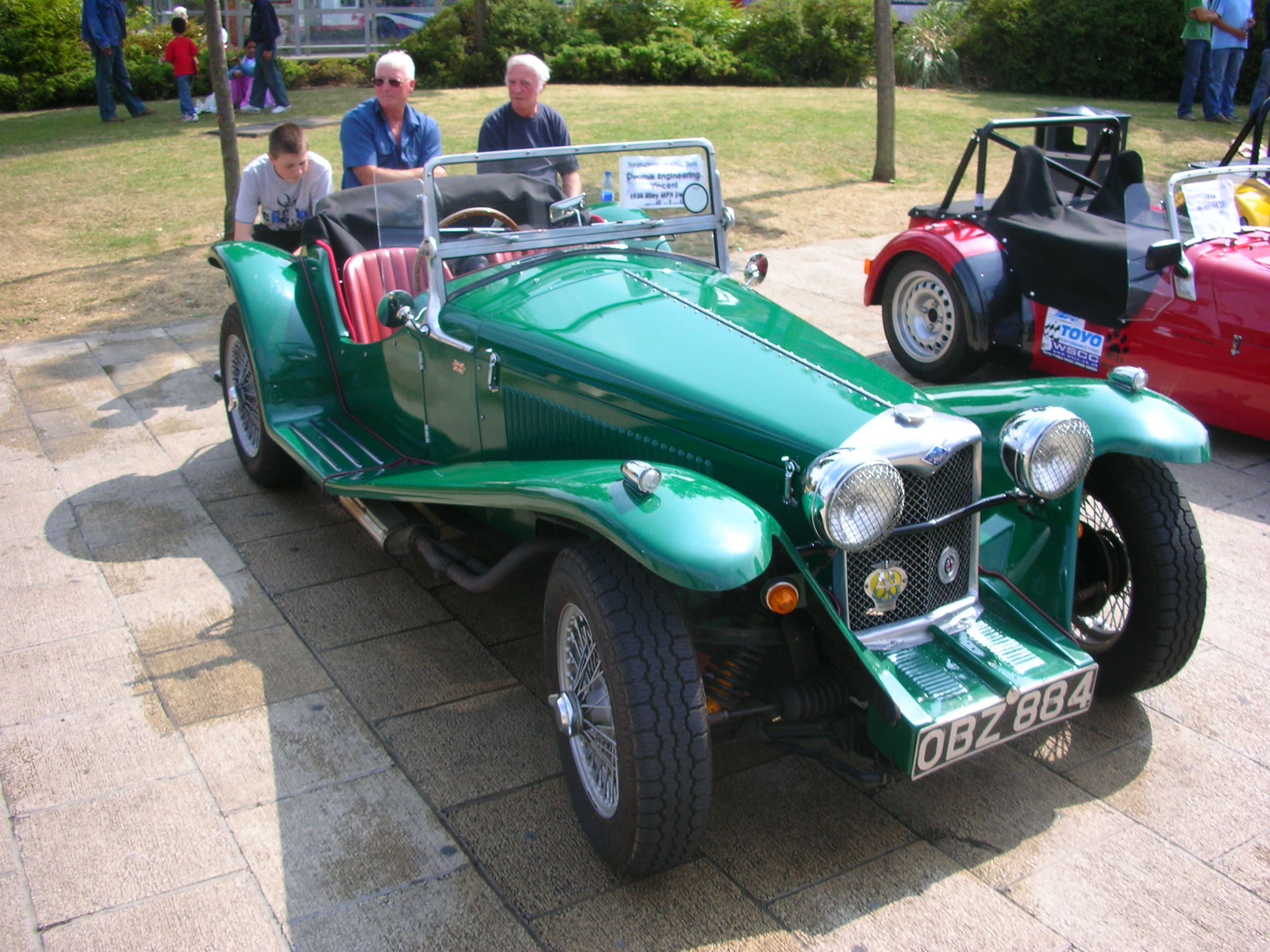
Vincent MPH replica

== Nuffield Organization ==
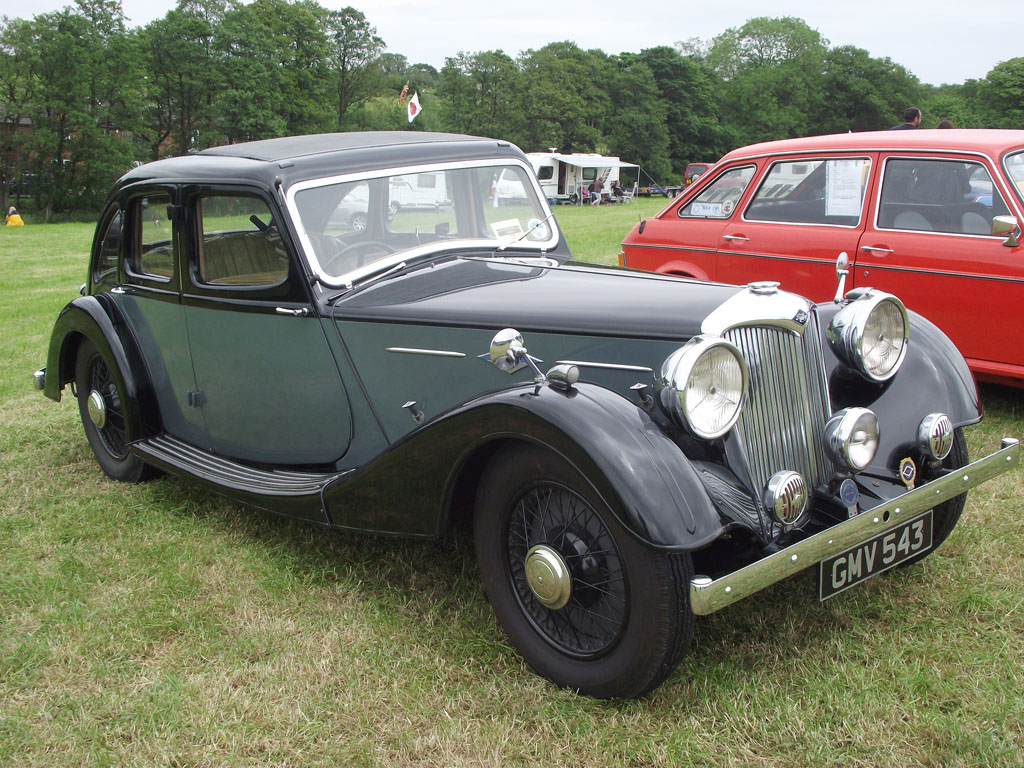
2½-litre Kestrel 1938 with the new Big Four engine

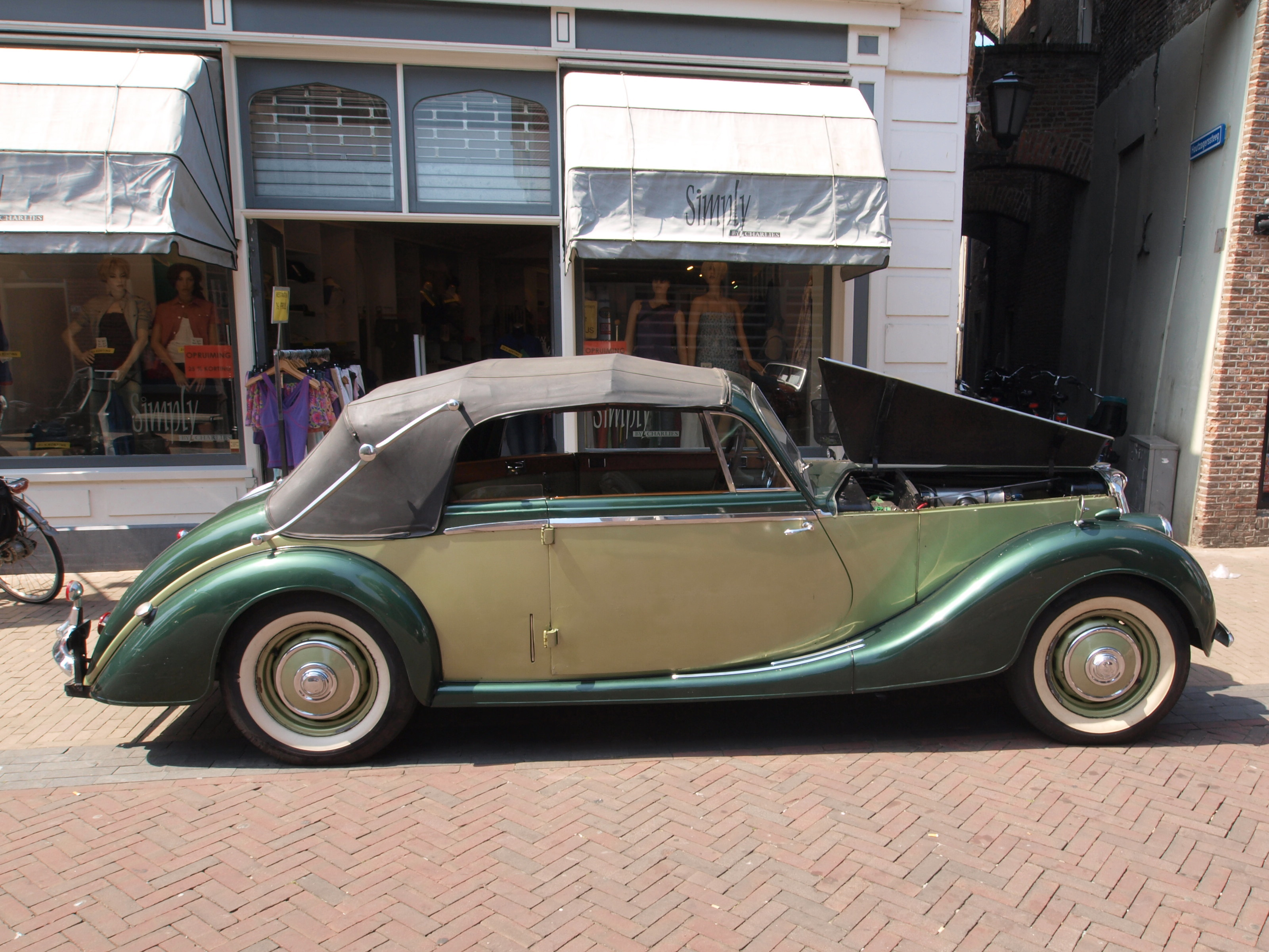
RMD 2½-litre drophead coupé 1950

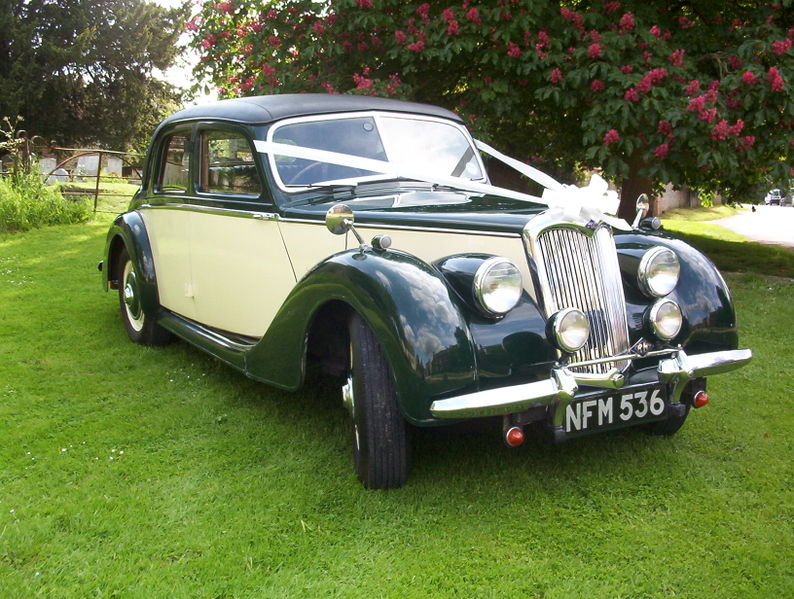
RMA 1½-litre saloon as a wedding car 1951

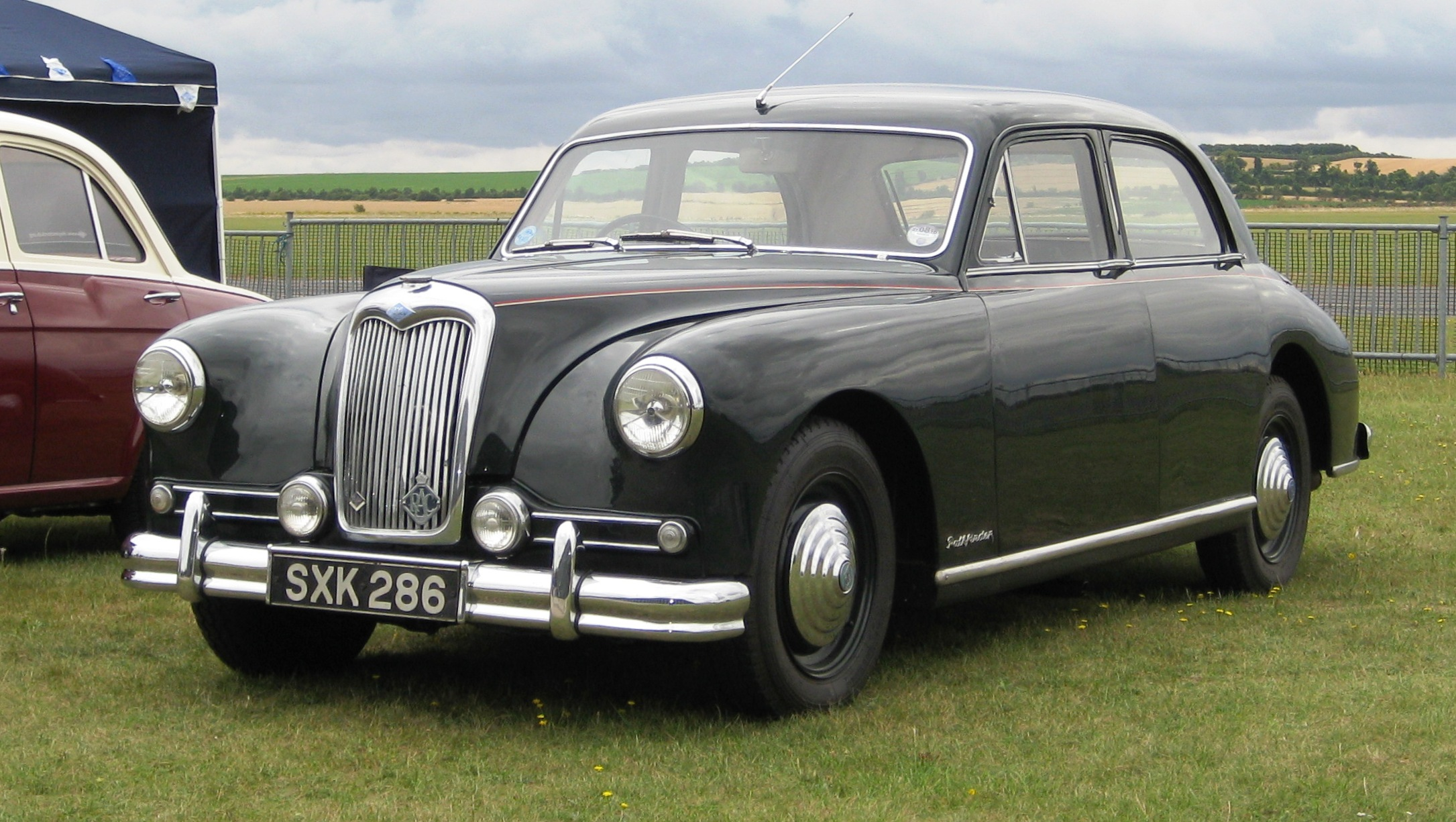
RMH 2½-litre Pathfinder 1953 the last real Riley with the Big Four engine 1956 example

By 1937 Riley began to look to other manufacturers for partnerships. A contract with Briggs Motor Bodies of Dagenham to provide all-steel bodies for a cheaper, more mass-market saloon had already turned sour, with dozens of unsold bodies littering the factory. It had withdrawn from works racing after its most successful year, 1934, although it continued to supply engines for the ERA, a voiturette (Formula 2) racing car based on the supercharged 6-cylinder 'White Riley', developed by ERA founder Raymond Mays in the mid-thirties. BMW of Munich, Germany was interested in expanding its range into England. The Riley brothers were more interested in a larger British concern, and looked to Triumph Motor Company, also of Coventry, as a natural fit. However, in February 1938 negotiations were suspended. On 24 February the directors placed Riley (Coventry) Limited and Autovia in voluntary receivership. On 10 March the Triumph board announced merger negotiations had been dropped.

It was announced on 9 September 1938 that Lord Nuffield had bought the assets and goodwill of Riley Motors (Coventry) Limited from the receiver, and that on completion he would transfer ownership to Morris Motors Limited "on terms which will show very considerable financial advantage to the company, resulting in further consolidation of its financial position". Mr Victor Riley then said this did not mean that the company would cease its activities. On 30 September, Victor Riley announced that Riley (Coventry) Limited would be wound up but it would appear that the proceeds of liquidation would be insufficient to meet the amount due to debenture holders. (Note: Riley Motors Limited, Company no. 00344156 was incorporated 8 September 1938—and changed its name in 1994 to BLMC Engineering Limited. Curiously the name Riley (Coventry) Limited continued to be used in all Nuffield group advertising until 1946 as if the original company had not been liquidated but continued to survive. Riley Motors Limited was used in all advertising between 1950 and July 1960) Nuffield paid £143,000 for the business, and formed a new company, Riley Motors Limited. However, in spite of the announced intention to be wound up, Riley (Coventry) Limited, perhaps for tax reasons, continued under the management of Victor Riley presumably with the necessary consents of debenture holders (part paid), creditors (nothing) and former shareholders (nothing). Nuffield passed ownership to his Morris Motors Limited for £100. Along with other Morris Motors subsidiaries Wolseley and MG, Riley was later promoted as a member of the Nuffield Organization. Riley Motors Limited seems to have begun trading at the end of the 1940s when Riley (Coventry) Limited disappeared.

Nuffield quickly took measures to firm up the Riley business. Autovia was discontinued, having built only 35 cars. Riley refocused on the 4-cylinder market with two engines: A 1.5-litre 12 hp engine and the "Big Four", a 2.5-litre 16 hp unit (The hp figures are RAC Rating, and bear no relationship to bhp or kW). Only a few bodies were made before the Second World War began in 1939, and some components were shared with Morris for economies of scale. They incorporated a number of mechanical improvements – notably a Nuffield synchromesh gearbox – but were essentially interim models, and had less of a Riley character. The new management responded to the concerns of the marque's loyal customers by re-introducing the Kestrel 2.5 litre Sports Saloon in updated form, but as the factory was turned over to wartime production, this was a short-lived development.

After the war, Riley installed the old engines in new models, based in concept on the 1936–38 'Continental', a fashionable 'notchback' design whose name had been changed prior to release to 'Close-Coupled Touring Saloon' owing to feared objections from Rolls-Royce. The 1.5-litre engine was installed in the RMA, and the Big Four was installed in the RMB. Both engines, being derived from pre-war models, lent themselves as power units for specials and new specialist manufacturers, such as Donald Healey. The RM series, sold under the "Magnificent Motoring" slogan, became a re-affirmation of Riley values in both road behaviour and appearance. 'Torsionic' front independent suspension and steering design inspired by the Citroën Traction Avant provided precise handling. Their flowing lines were particularly well-balanced, combining pre-war coachbuilt elegance with more modern features, such as headlamps faired into the front wings. The RMC, a 3-seater roadster, was an unsuccessful attempt to break into the US market. The RMD was an elegant 4/5-seater two-door drophead, of which few were made. The 1.5-litre RME and 2.5-litre RMF were later developments of the saloon versions, which continued in production into the mid-1950s.

Nuffield removed Victor Riley in 1947. In early 1949 the Coventry works were made an extension of Morris Motors' engine branch. Riley production was consolidated with MG at Abingdon. Wolseley production was moved to Cowley. Nuffield's marques were then organised in a similar way to those of General Motors: Morris was the economy, mass-market brand, and Wolseley the luxury marque. Aside from their small saloons, MG largely offered performance cars, especially with their open sportsters, while Riley sought to be both sporty and luxurious. With Wolseley also competing for the top position, however, the range was crowded and confused.

== British Motor Corporation ==
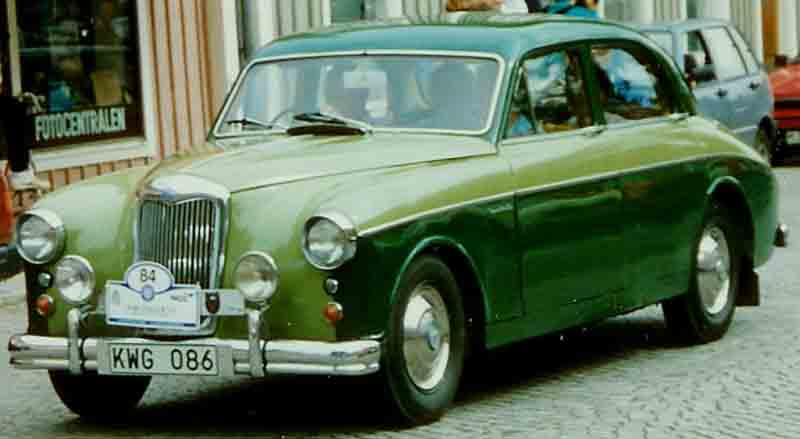
Two-Point-Six saloon 1959

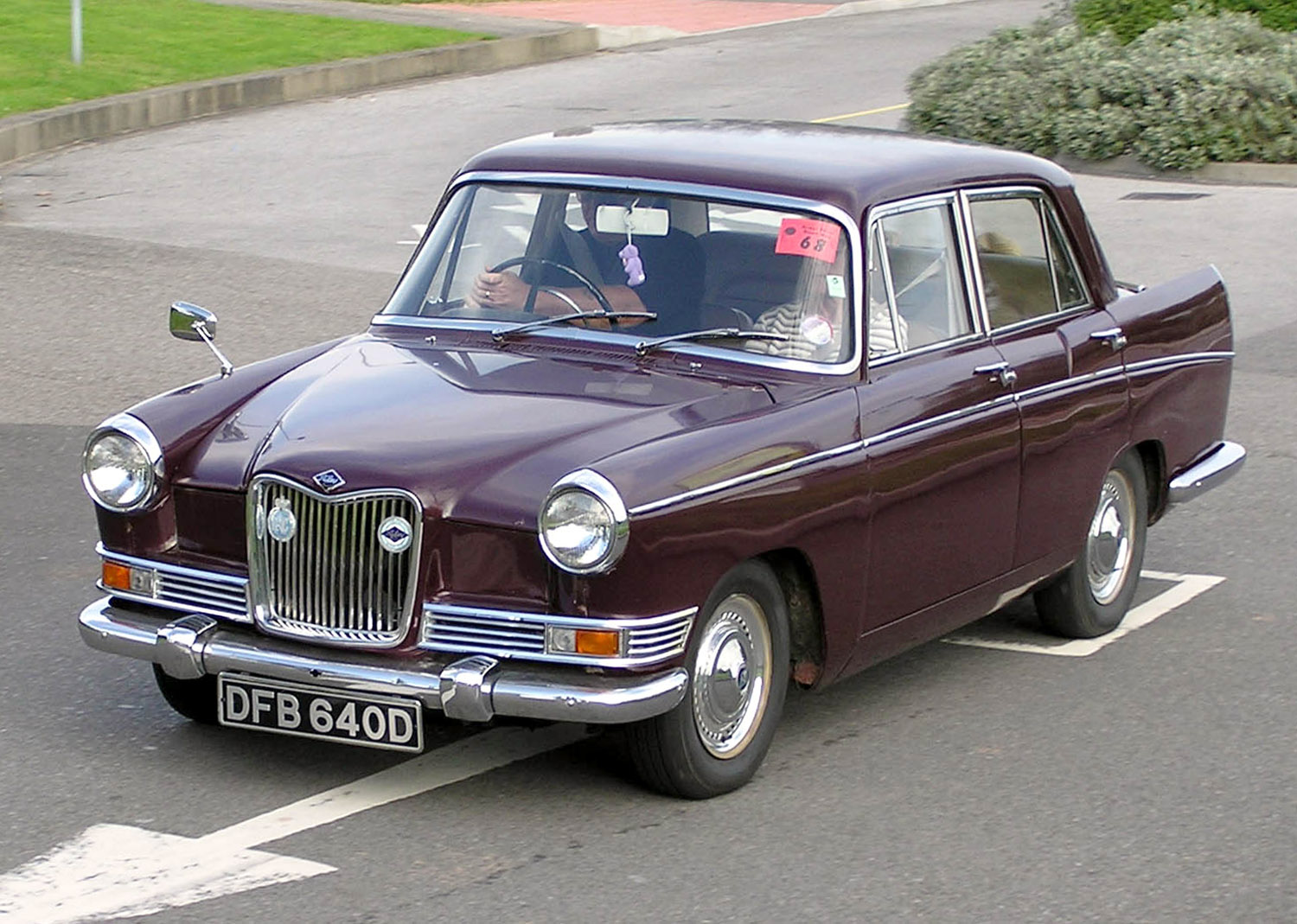
4/72 saloon 1965

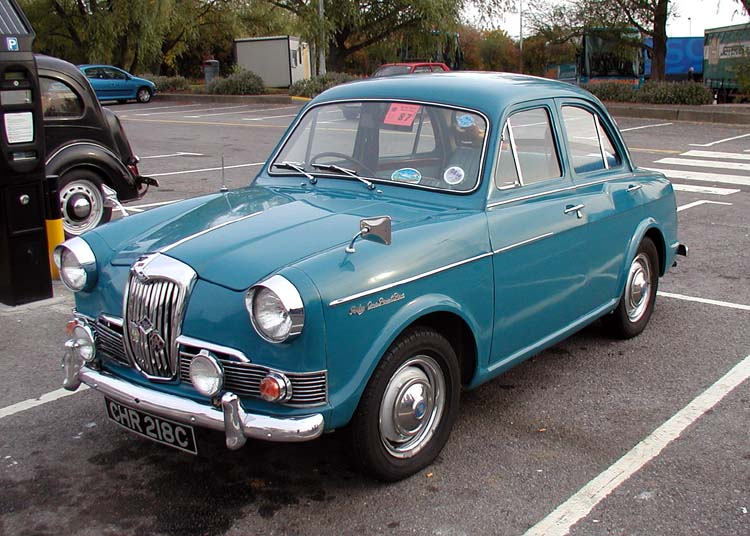
One-Point-Five saloon 1965

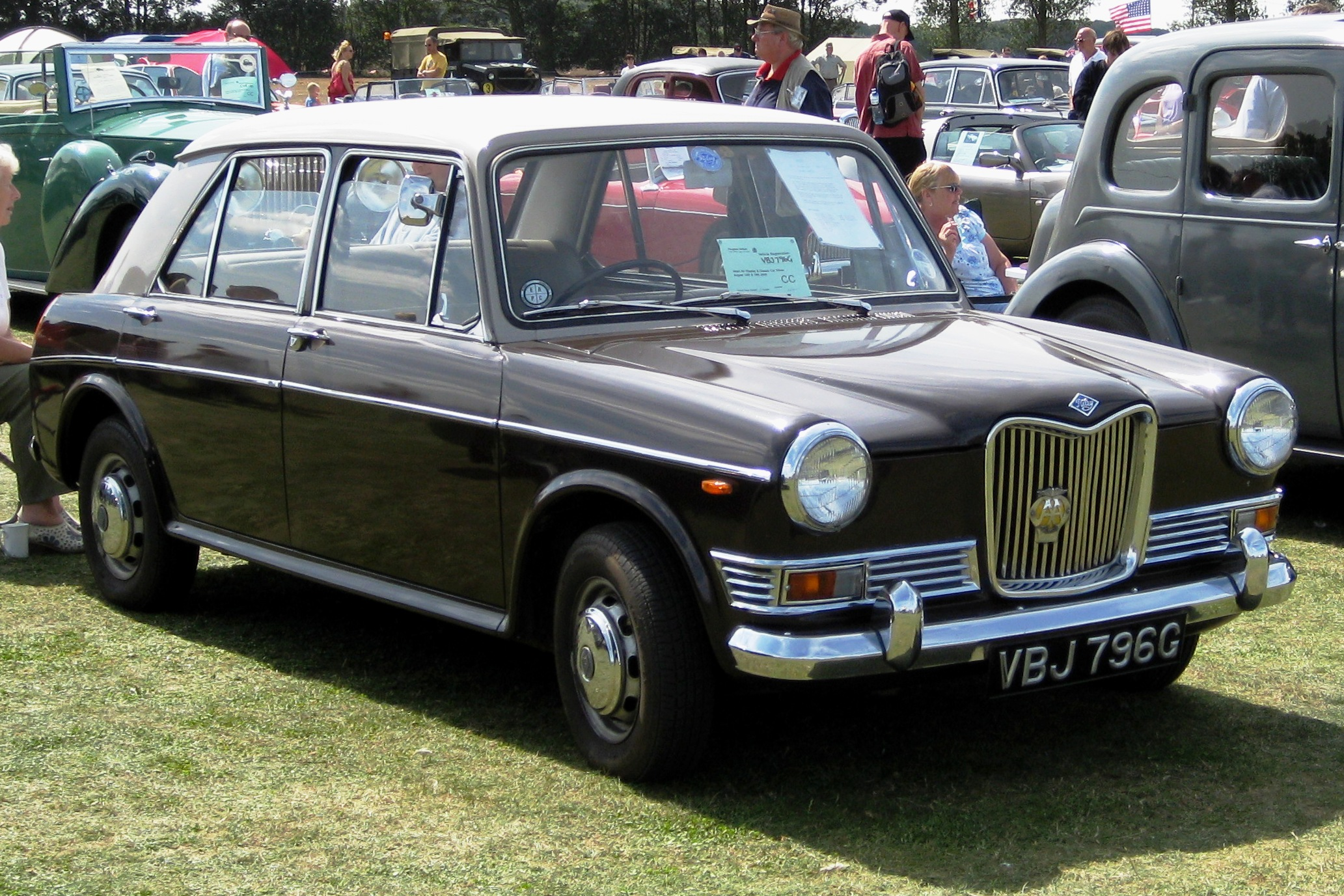
Kestrel saloon 1968

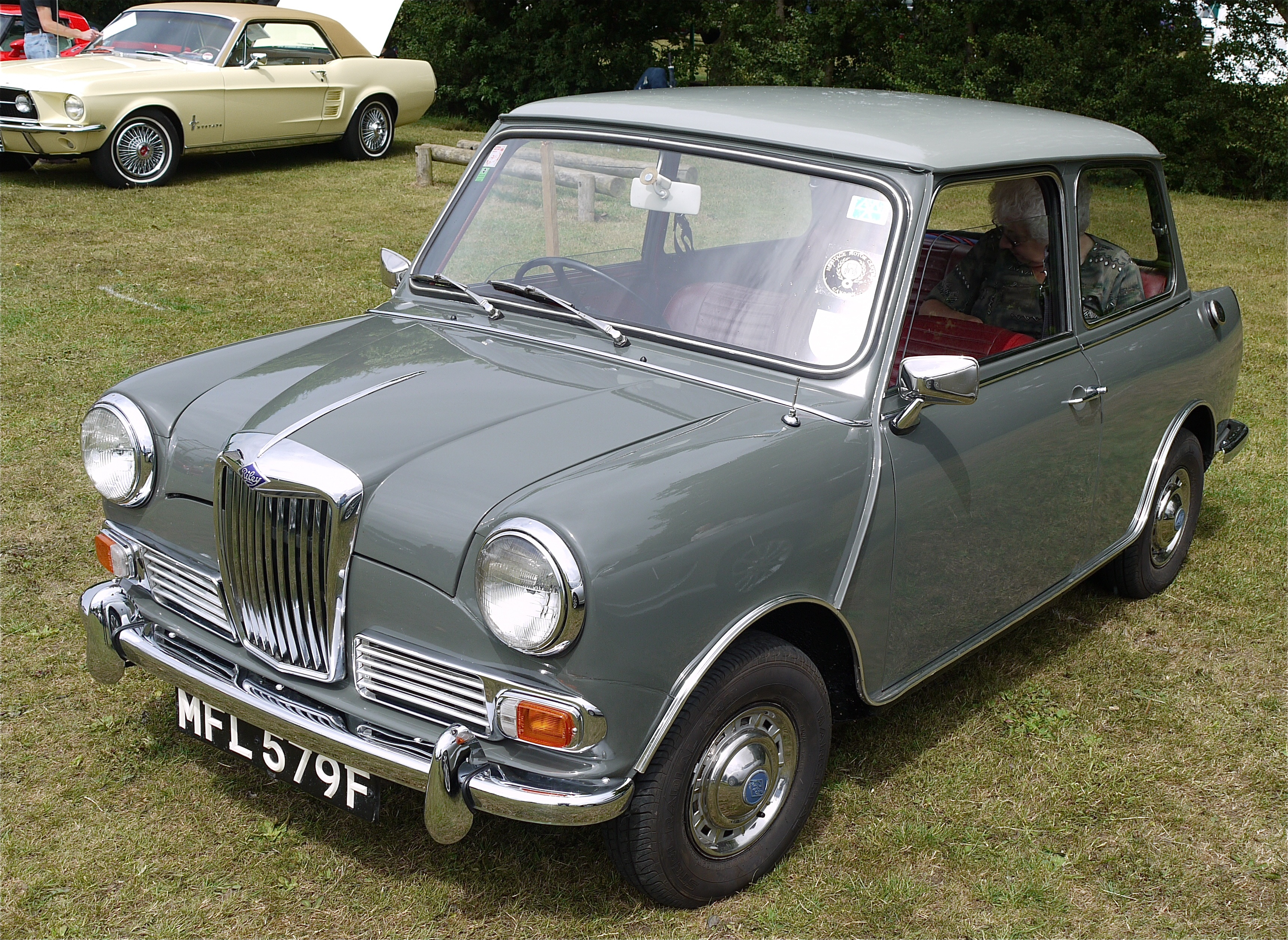
Elf Mk III saloon 1968

The confusion became more acute in 1952 with the merger of Nuffield and Austin as the British Motor Corporation. Now, Riley was positioned between MG and Wolseley and most Riley models became, like those, little more than badge-engineered versions of Austin / Morris designs.

However, the first all-new Riley under BMC was designated the RMH, and because of its distinctive engine and suspension design, it has been called 'the last real Riley'. This was the Pathfinder, with Riley's familiar 2.5-litre four developed to produce 110 bhp. (The RMG 'Wayfarer', a projected 1.5-litre version, was rejected as underpowered). The Pathfinder body was later reworked and, with a different engine and rear suspension, sold as the Wolseley 6/90. The Riley lost its distinct (though externally subtle) differences in 1958, and the 6/90 of that year was available badge engineered as a Riley Two-Point-Six. Although this was the only postwar 6-cylinder Riley, its C-Series engine was actually less powerful than the Riley Big Four that it replaced. This was to be the last large Riley, with the model dropped in May 1959 and Riley refocusing on the under-2-litre market segment.

Riley and Wolseley were linked in small cars as well. Launched in 1957, the Riley One-Point-Five and Wolseley 1500 were based on the unused but intended replacement for the Morris Minor. They shared their exteriors, but the Riley was marketed as the more performance-oriented option, having an uprated engine, twin SU carburettors, and a close-ratio gearbox. With its good handling, compact, sports-saloon styling and well-appointed interior, the One-Point-Five quite successfully recaptured the character of the 1930s light saloons.

At the top of the Riley range for April 1959 was the new Riley 4/Sixty-Eight saloon. Again, it was a badge-engineered version of other BMC models. The steering was perhaps the worst feature of the car, being Austin-derived cam and peg rather than the rack and pinion of the One-Point-Five. Overall, it could not provide the sharp and positive drive associated with previous Rileys, being based on the modest Austin Cambridge and Morris Oxford. Sharing many features with the similarly upmarket MG Magnette Mark III and Wolseley 15/60, it was the most luxurious of the versions, which were all comfortable and spacious, and (nominally) styled by Farina. In 1961 the car was refreshed, along with its siblings, and rebadged as the 4/Seventy-Two.

1961 saw the introduction of the Riley Elf based on the original Mini. Again, a Wolseley model, the Hornet, was introduced simultaneously. This time, the Riley and Wolseley versions differed visually by their grilles, but were mechanically identical.

The final Riley of the BMC era was the Kestrel 1100/1300, based on the Austin/Morris 1100/1300 saloon (BMC ADO16). This also had siblings in Wolseley and MG versions. After objections from Riley enthusiasts, the Kestrel name was dropped for the last facelift in 1968, the Riley 1300.

Between 1966 and 1968, a series of mergers took place in the British motor industry, ultimately creating the British Leyland Motor Corporation, whose management embarked on a programme of rationalisation, in which the Riley marque was an early casualty. The badge began to be discontinued in many export markets almost immediately. A BLMC press release was reported in The Times of 9 July 1969: "British Leyland will stop making Riley cars from today. "With less than 1 per cent of the home market, they are not viable" the company said last night. The decision will end 60 years of motoring history. No other marques in the British Leyland stable are likely to suffer the same fate "in the foreseeable future". The last Riley badged car was produced in 1969, and the marque became dormant.

For many enthusiasts, the name of Riley still resonates in the 21st century. In spite of the decline of the marque under BMC and British Leyland, surviving Rileys of the period are now popular, with the Riley 'face' and badge lending a distinctive character. Three owners' clubs cater for enthusiasts: the Riley Motor Club, which was founded in 1925 and caters for all Rileys; the Riley Register, which is exclusively for Rileys built up until 1940; and the Riley RM Club, which is exclusively for the RM series, built between 1946 and 1957. Many original racing Rileys compete regularly in VSCC (Vintage Sports Car Club) events, and pre-war racing 'specials' continue to be created from tired or derelict saloons.

== Current ownership and possible revival ==
After buying Rover Group in 1994, BMW planned to revive Riley. At a dinner hosted by the Association of Riley Clubs celebrating the centenary of Riley, BMW Chairman Bernd Pischetsrieder, who was an enthusiast for many historical British marques, announced that the Riley name was to return. He stated that development of a new model was to begin immediately, with Rover engineering director Nick Stephenson in charge of the project. It was later revealed that BMW had developed a three-door concept car based on the Rover 75, named the Riley Coupe. The project was later cancelled after Pischetsrieder's removal in 1999, and BMW's subsequent divestment of the MG Rover Group in 2000. The rights to the Triumph and Riley marques, along with Mini, were retained by BMW.

In 2007 William Riley, who claims to be a descendant of the Riley family (although this has been disputed), formed MG Sports and Racing Europe Ltd. This new business acquired assets relating to the MG XPower SV sports car from PricewaterhouseCoopers, the administrators of the defunct MG Rover Group, and intended to continue production of the model as the MG XPower WR. Production never began.

In September 2010, Autocar magazine reported that BMW was considering reviving the Riley brand as a variant of the redesigned MINI. This would most likely be a luxury version, inspired by the Elf of 1961–9, with a 'notchback' (booted) body, and the interior trimmed in wood and leather in the manner of earlier Rileys. No sources were quoted, however, and in the absence of any statement from BMW reports of the possible resurrection of Riley must be regarded as highly speculative. Autocar reiterated this information in April 2016.

== List of Riley vehicles ==
=== Pre-World War I ===
- 1907–1911 Riley 9 (1907)
- 1907–1907 Riley 12
- 1909–1914 Riley 10
- 1908–1914 Riley 12/18
- 1915–1916 Riley 10

=== Inter-war years ===
- 1913–1922 Riley 17/30 -Introduced at 1913 London Motor Show
- 1919–1924 Riley Eleven -'the first Riley'
- 1925–1928 Riley Twelve -Sidevalve engine
- 1926–1937 Riley Nine
- 1929–1934 Riley 14/6 -Multiple body choices
- 1933–1935 Riley 12/6
- 1935–1935 Riley 12/4
- 1935–1938 Riley 15/6 -Available in four saloon body varieties and one tourer
- 1935–1938 Riley 1½-litre
- 1936–1938 Riley 8/90 V8 - very few Adelphi saloons were built
- 1937–1940 Riley 16
- 1938–1938 Riley Victor -Very few made
- 1939–1940 Riley 12 Nuffield body

Notable bodies

- 1927–1931 Riley Brooklands Based on the Riley Nine
- 1934–1935 Riley Imp Based on the Riley Nine
- 1934–1935 Riley MPH 12/6 14/6 or 15/6
- 1936–1938 Riley Sprite 12/4 1½ litre

=== Post-war ===
- Roadster
  - 1948–1951 RMC
  - 1949–1951 RMD
- Mid-sized
  - 1945–1952 RMA
  - 1952–1955 RME
  - 1957–1965 One-Point-Five (Wolseley 1500)
  - 1959–1961 4/Sixty-Eight (Wolseley 15/60)
  - 1961–1969 4/Seventy-Two (Wolseley 16/60)
- Large
  - 1946–1952 RMB
  - 1952–1953 RMF
  - 1953–1957 Pathfinder
  - 1958–1959 Two-Point-Six (Wolseley 6/90)
- Mini
  - 1961–1969 Riley Elf (Mini variant)
- Compact
  - 1965–1969 Riley Kestrel (variant of the Austin/Morris 1100/1300)

== See also ==
- List of car manufacturers of the United Kingdom
- 1936 Benalla Centenary Race
