= Riley 16 =

1938 Riley 16hp
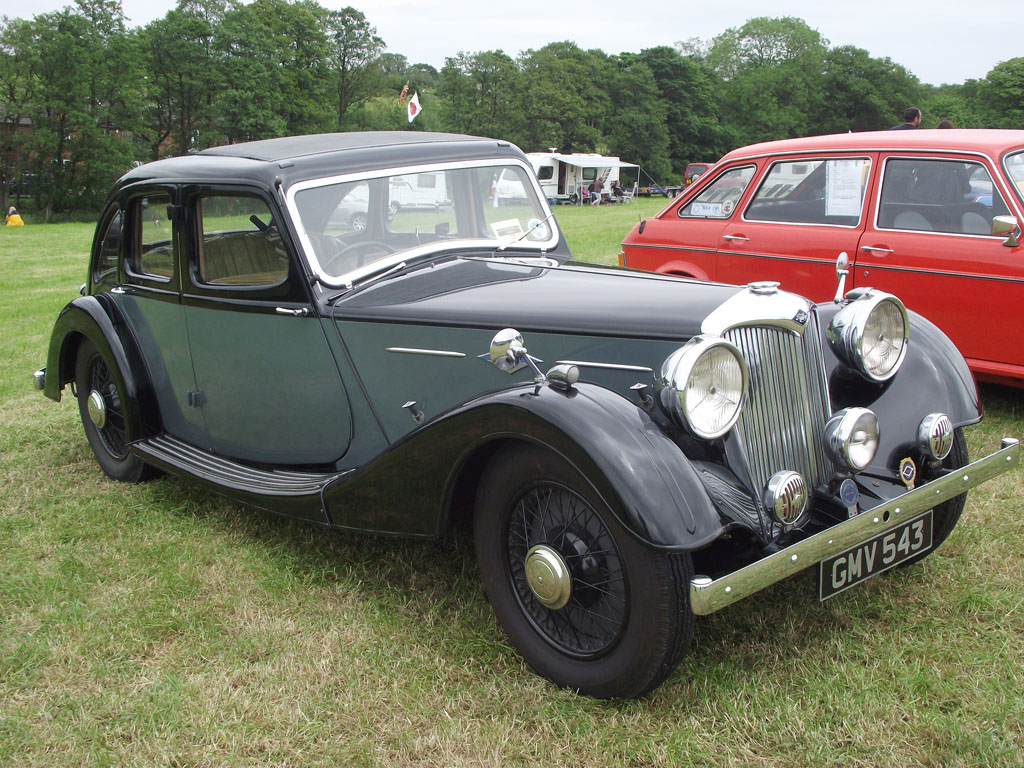
- Kestrel 16hp 6-light saloon first registered January 1938

Overview
- Manufacturer: Riley
- Production: 1939–1940

Body and chassis
- Body style: 1937: Continental sports saloon; Kestrel 6-light saloon; Adelphi 6-light saloon; 1939; Kestrel 6-light saloon Kestrel 2-door drophead coupé

Powertrain
- Engine: 2.4 L Straight-4

Dimensions
- Wheelbase: 116 in (2,946 mm)
- Length: 179 in (4,547 mm)
- Width: 63 in (1,600 mm)

Chronology
- Predecessor: none
- Successor: Riley RMB

The Riley 16 hp is a car made by the British Riley company from 1937 to 1940. It slotted into Riley's range immediately below their 18 hp V8 model. Announced in September 1937 for the Earls Court Motor Show it became one of the two genuine Riley models in the rationalised range that followed the 1938 takeover by the Nuffield Organization.

It had a 2443cc straight-four engine with twin cams and S.U carburettor which developed 82 bhp (61 kW). The transmission was a four speed manual. It was capable of a top speed of around 80 mph (129 km/h). The chassis was a lengthened version of the one used on the Riley 12 hp which was introduced at the same time.

The 1939/40 16 hp was available with a standard saloon, Kestrel fastback saloon or drophead coupe coachwork.

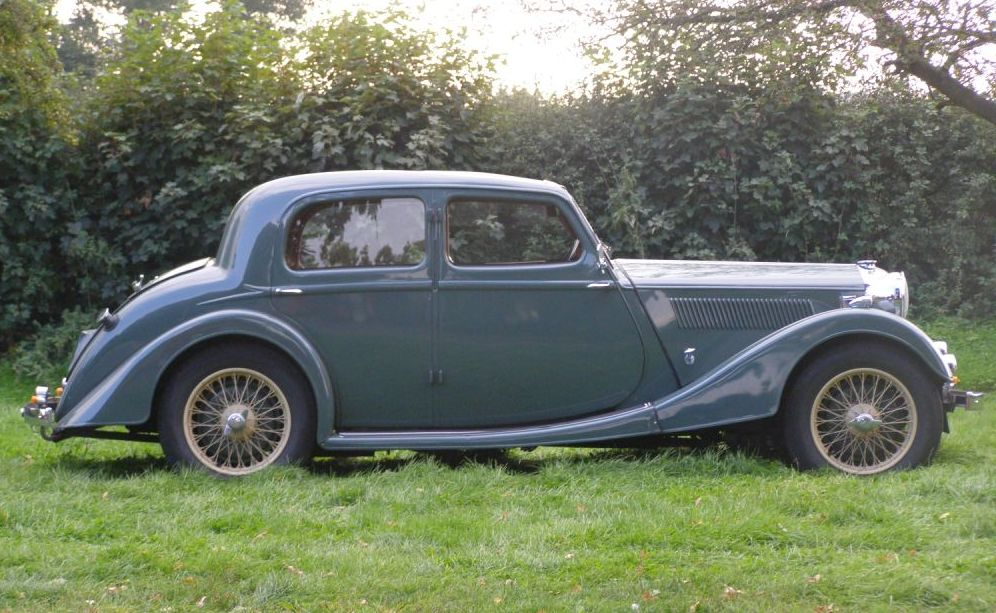
Continental sports saloon (this body is on a 12/4 chassis)

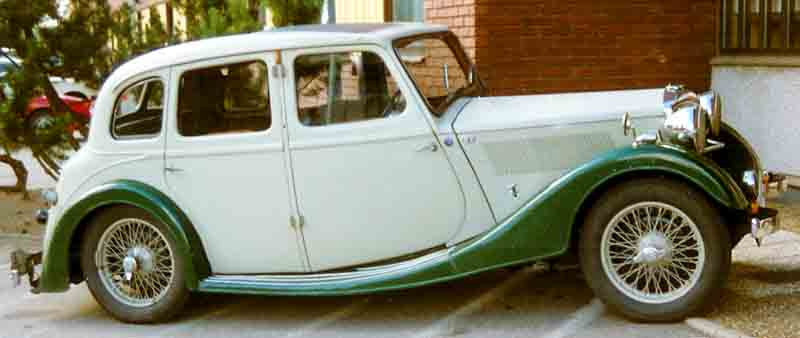
Adelphi 6-light saloon (this body is on a 15/6 chassis)

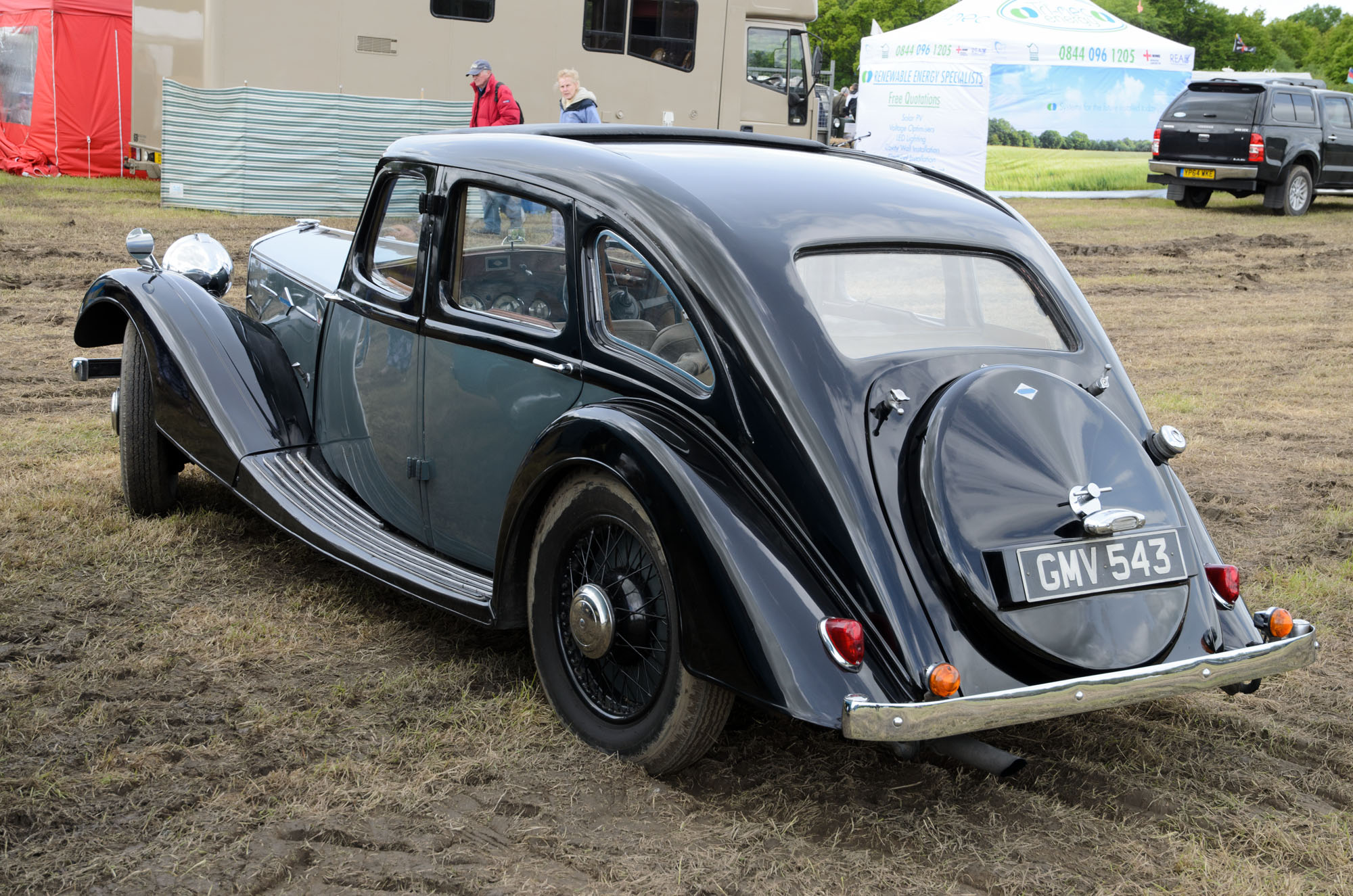
Kestrel 16hp 6-light saloon

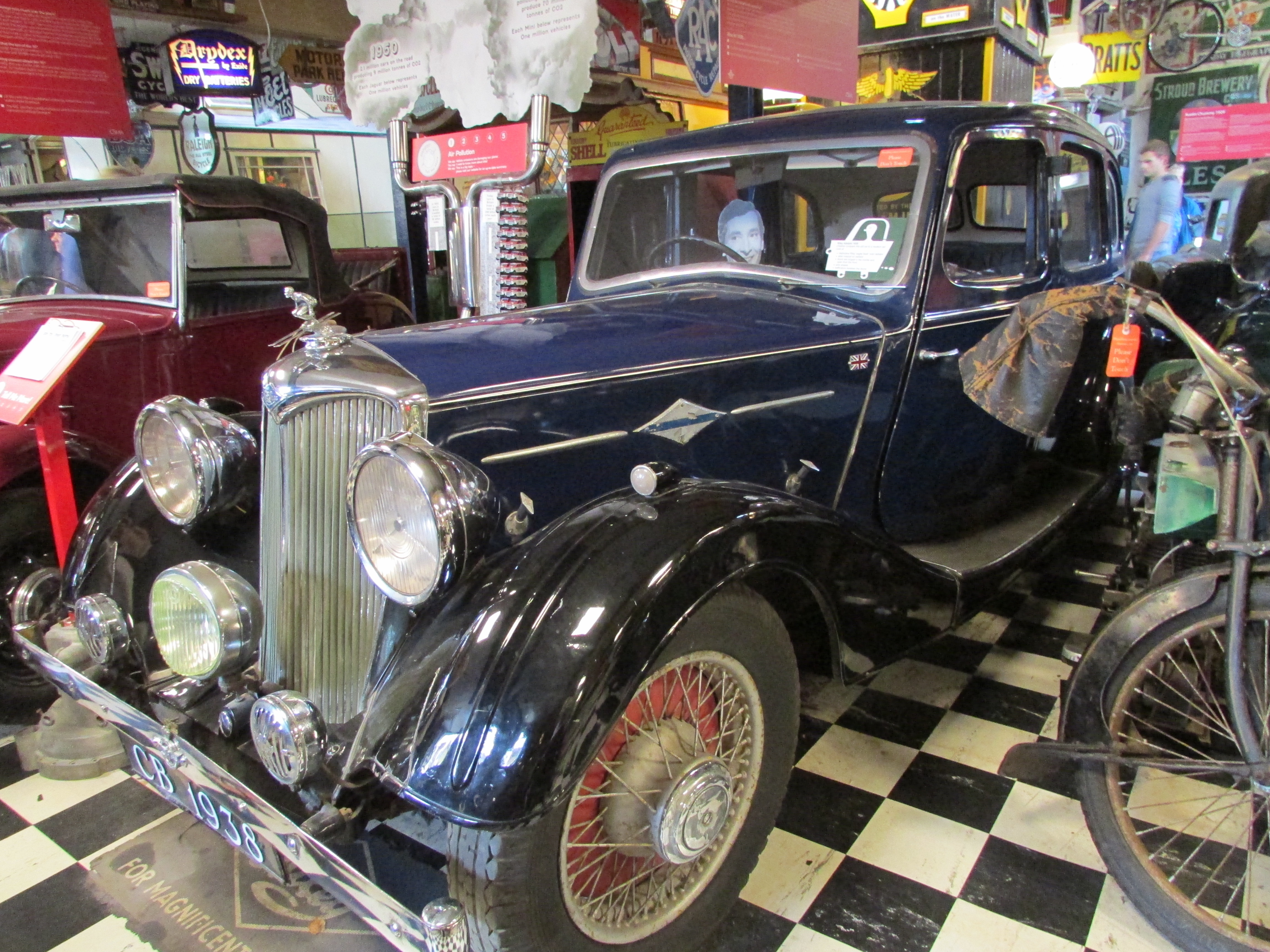
Adelphi 16hp 6-light saloon

Riley 2½-litre Big Four

Overview
- Manufacturer: Riley Motors Limited
- Also called: Riley 16 h.p.
- Production: 1937 to 1957

Layout
- Configuration: straight four
- Displacement: 2.443 L (149.1 cu in)
- Cylinder bore: 80.5 mm (3.17 in)
- Piston stroke: 120 mm (4.7 in)
- Cylinder block material: cast iron, aluminium sump, alloy pistons
- Cylinder head material: cast iron, hemispherical combustion chambers, spark plugs in centre between valve covers
- Valvetrain: 90-degree angled overhead valves operated by twin high-lift camshafts moving rockers with short light stiff push-rods powered from the crankshaft by duplex roller chains
- Compression ratio: 6.9 : 1

Combustion
- Fuel system: Twin H4 SU carburettors mechanical petrol pump
- Fuel type: petrol
- Oil system: pressure fed from sump by submerged gear-type pump driven by skew gear from camshaft
- Cooling system: water, thermostatically controlled flow, belt-driven water pump and radiator fan

Output
- Power output: 106 bhp @ 4,500 rpm Tax rating 16hp

Chronology
- Predecessor: none before 1937
- Successor: Riley RMH then BMC C-Series engine

Michael Sedgwick described this long-stroke four as a first-class tourer in the Riley tradition, Britain's largest four since the 4½-lire Bentley ended production in 1931. Its chassi, he said, was regular Riley - beam axles and Girling brakes - fitted with Borg-Warner overdrive as standard. It would run up to 90 mph. The engine ran very smoothly for a four-cylinder. Good value for money; it survived into Riley's Nuffield-owned era but with disc wheels, umbrella handbrake lever and ordinary synchromesh gearboxes, (Nuffield) ". . . made a few wire-wheeled Kestrels in 1939 and 1940 to keep the traditionalists happy".
