= Riley RM =

Riley RM Series
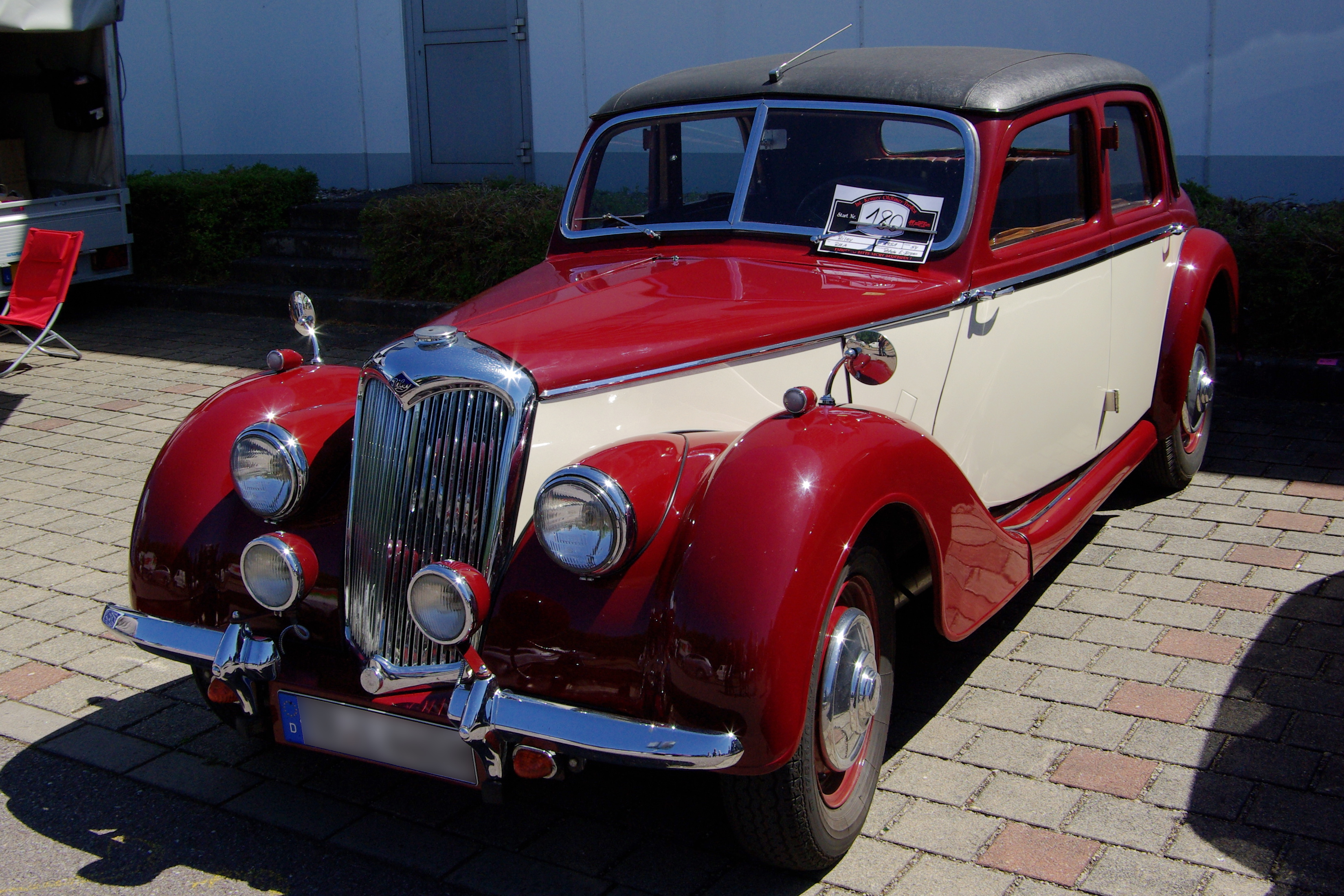
- 1951 Riley RMA

Overview
- Manufacturer: Riley Motors
- Production: 1945–1955
- Assembly: United Kingdom: Coventry, England (until 1949); United Kingdom: Abingdon, England (1949–1955)

Body and chassis
- Class: Executive car (E); compact executive car (D)
- Body style: 4-door saloon; 2-door open 2 or 3-seater; 2-door 4-seater cabriolet
- Layout: FR layout

Dimensions
- Wheelbase: 1.5 L cars – 112 in (2,845 mm); 2.5 L cars – 119 in (3,023 mm)
- Length: 1.5 L cars – 179 in (4,547 mm); 2.5 L cars – 186 in (4,724 mm)
- Width: 63 in (1,600 mm)
- Height: 59 in (1,499 mm)

Chronology
- Predecessor: Riley Kestrel body; and; 12/4 1½-litre engine; or; 16/4 2½-litre Big Four engine
- Successor: Riley Pathfinder

The Riley RM is a series of executive cars and compact executive cars that were made by Riley Motors from 1945 until 1955. They were the last models developed independently by Riley before its parent company, Nuffield, merged with Austin to form BMC. The RM series was produced in Coventry until 1949, when production moved to the MG works at Abingdon. Until 1952, models were marketed as the Riley 1½ Litre and the Riley 2½ Litre. The term RM has been used retrospectively to encompass models produced before 1952.

There were four types of RM vehicles produced. All used Riley engines with four cylinders in-line, hemispherical combustion chambers and twin camshafts mounted high at the sides of the cylinder block.

The RMA was a large saloon, and was replaced by the RME. Both used a 1.5 L (1,496 cc) 12 hp (8.9 kW) (RAC Rating), developed before WWII.

The RMB was a longer car, and it was replaced by the RMF. Both cars used a larger engine, new in 1937, a 2.5 L (2,443 cc) 16 hp (12 kW) (RAC Rating) "Big Four".

The RMC and RMD were limited-production cars, an open 2 or 3-seater Roadster and a 4-seater drophead.

The Riley Pathfinder was the RMH, and was the last saloon to be built with the Riley Big Four engine.

== Kestrel ==
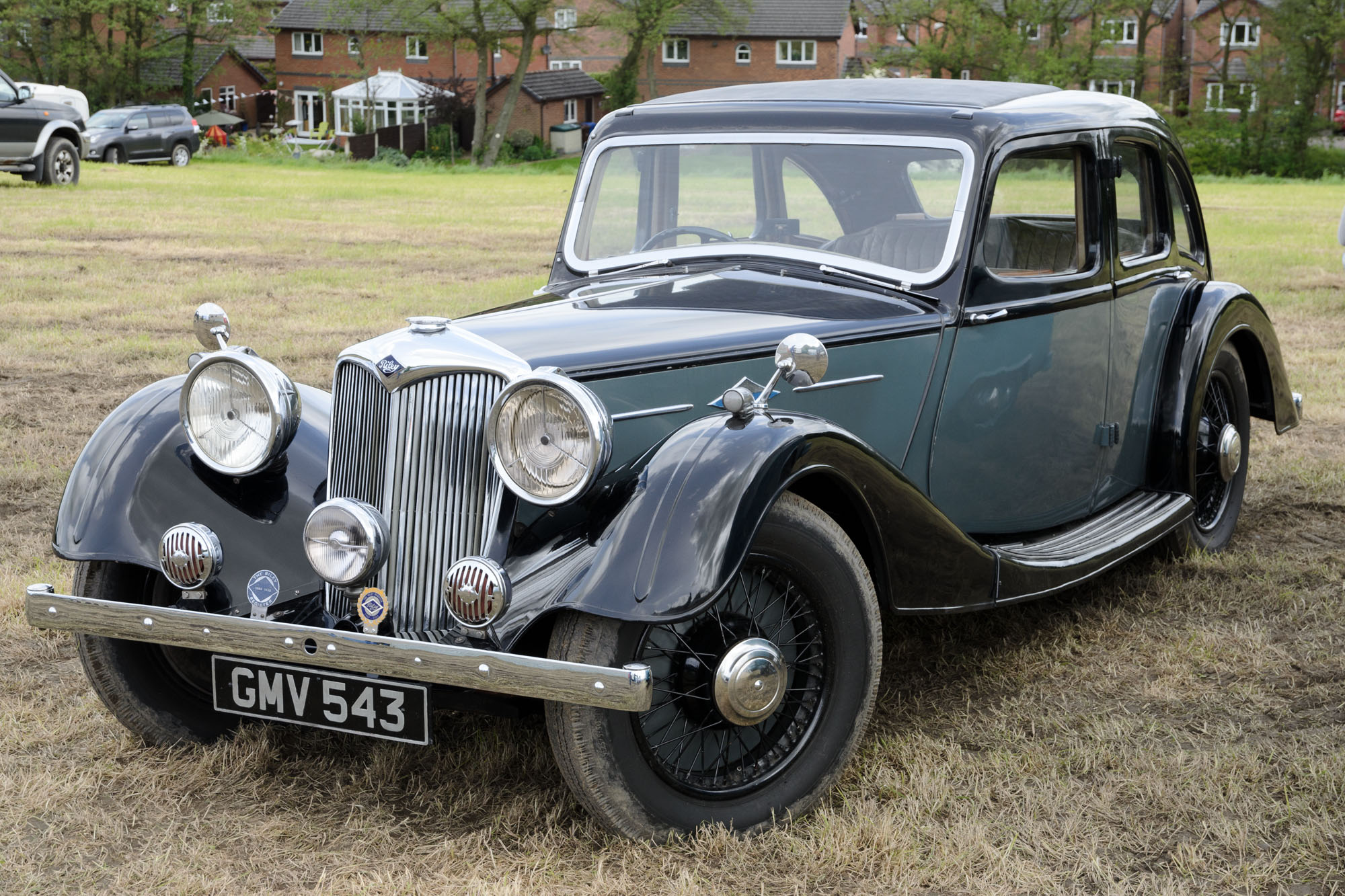
1938 Riley Kestrel

The RM was inspired by Riley Motors' successful and stylish pre-war 1.5 and 2.5 Litre Kestrel saloons, but with a new chassis, which with its Riley "torsionic" independent front-wheel suspension incorporated the experience of the wartime years.

The RM series was a new design, because air raids on Coventry destroyed the patterns of dies for the pre-war models.

== Riley RMA ==
Riley RMA
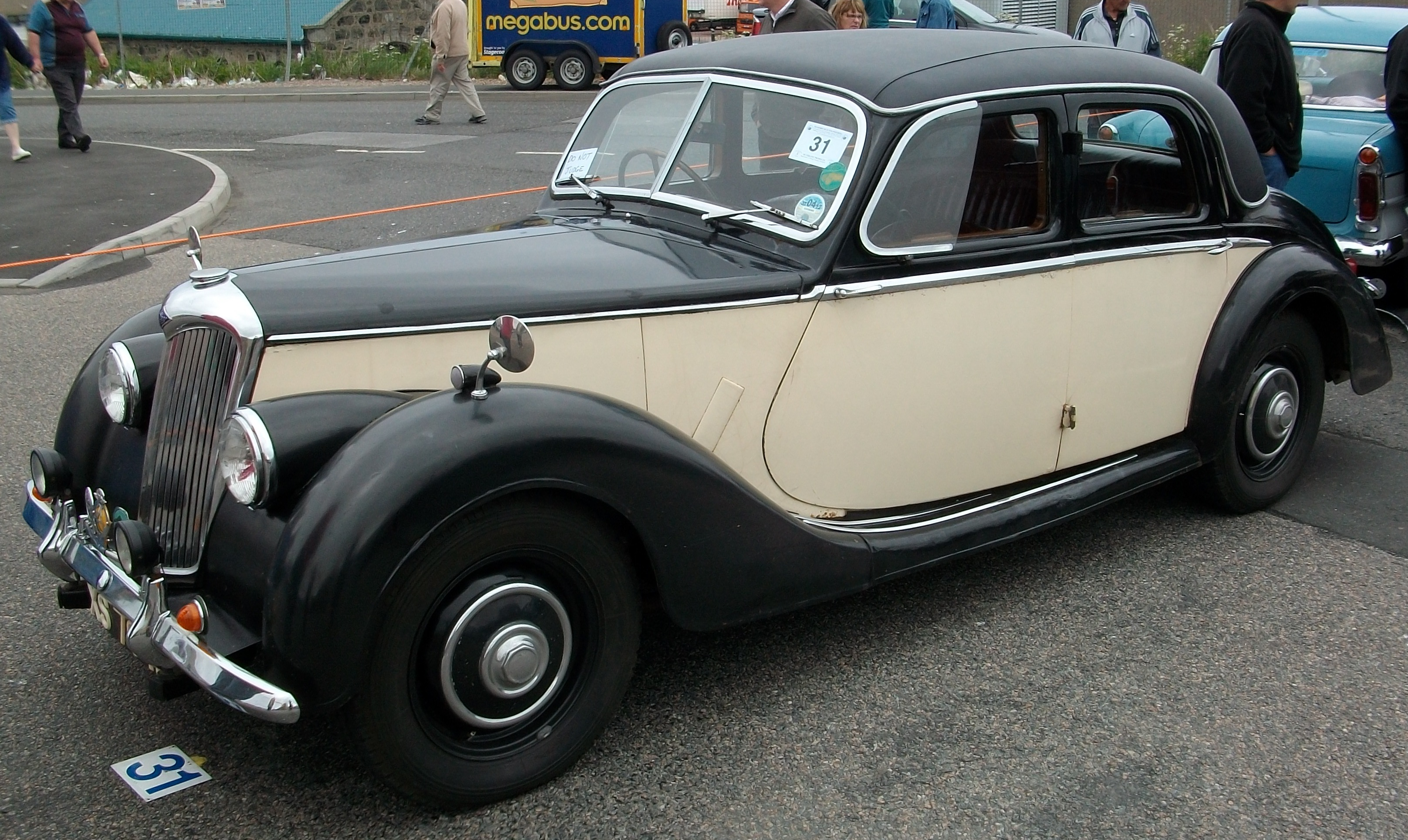
- 1952 RMA

Overview
- Production: 1945–1952; 10,504 produced.

Body and chassis
- Body style: 4-door saloon

Powertrain
- Engine: 1.5 L Straight-4 as for 2.5-litre Big Four but bore 69mm by stroke 100mm and bhp 60 @5,300 rpm

Chronology
- Predecessor: Riley 12/4 and Riley 12
- Successor: Riley RME

The RMA was the first post-war Riley. It was announced in August 1945 with the news it would become available in the autumn. It used the 1.5 L engine and was equipped with hydro-mechanical brakes and an independent suspension using torsion bars in front. The body frame (not to be confused with the chassis) was made of wood in the English tradition, and the car featured traditional styling. The car was capable of reaching 75 mph (121 km/h). The RMA was produced from 1945 until 1952 when it was replaced by the RME.

== Riley RMB ==
Riley RMB
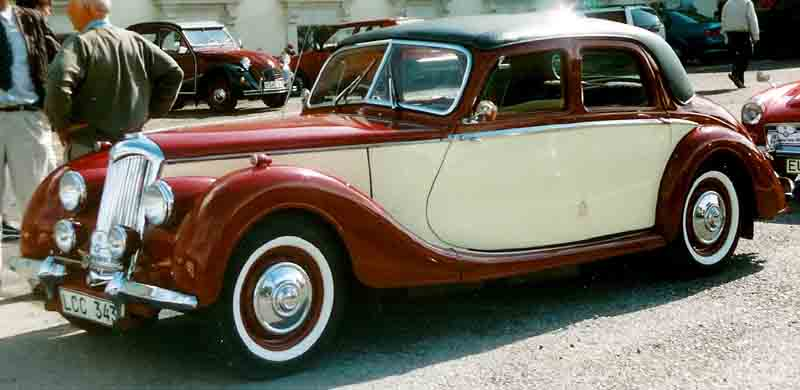

Overview
- Production: 1946–1952; 6,900 produced

Body and chassis
- Body style: 4-door saloon

Powertrain
- Engine: 2.5 L Straight-4

Dimensions
- Wheelbase: 119 in (3,023 mm)
- Length: 186 in (4,724 mm)
- Width: 63.5 in (1,613 mm)
- Height: 59 in (1,499 mm)

Chronology
- Successor: Riley RMF

The 2.5 L (2443 cc) RMB was a lengthened RMA launched a year later in 1946.

It used the 2.5 L (2443 cc) "Big Four" engine with twin SU carburettors, starting with 90 hp (67 kW) but increasing to 100 hp (75 kW) for 1948 with a 95 mph (153 km/h) top speed.

The wheelbase was 6.5 in (165 mm) longer and the overall length was a full 7 in (178 mm) longer. The RMB was replaced by the RMF for 1952.

The RMB 2½ Litre models have light blue bonnet and bootlid badges, differentiating them from the RMA 1½ Litre models which have dark blue badges.

A car tested by The Motor magazine in 1949 had a top speed of 90 mph (140 km/h) and could accelerate from 0–60 mph (97 km/h) in 16.8 seconds. A fuel consumption of 19.6 mpg_{‑imp} (14.4 L/100 km; 16.3 mpg_{‑US}) was recorded. The test car cost £1224 including taxes.

== Riley RMC ==
Riley RMC
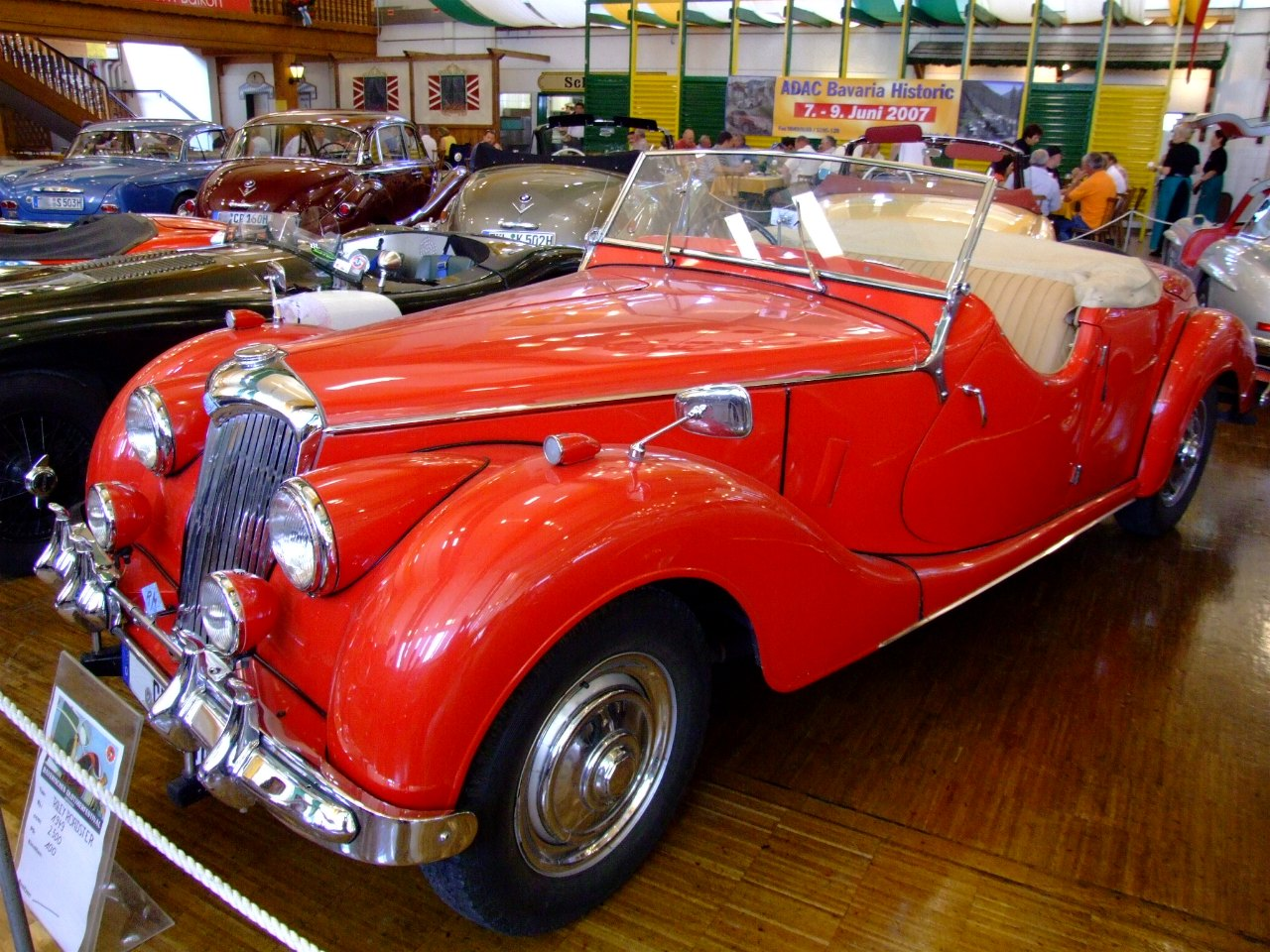
- 1949 RMC

Overview
- Production: 1948–1951; 507 produced

Body and chassis
- Body style: 2-door open 2/3-seater

Powertrain
- Engine: 2.5 L Straight-4

The RMC (Roadster) was an open 2-door, single bench seat, 2/3-seater version of the RMB, with a large rear deck area and fold-flat windscreen. Announced in March 1948, it was delivered to Geneva just too late to be exhibited at the Geneva Motor Show. Primarily designed for the North American export market, it was normally built with left-hand drive, with the gear change lever on the steering column. The bonnet and radiator were lowered and the bonnet catches were arranged to be operated internally. Extra over-riders were fitted to the bumpers and the fuel tank was enlarged to 20 imp gal (91 L; 24 US gal).

Eighteen months later, in September 1949, Riley announced future production would include a small quota of cars with right-hand drive. Riley attributed that to a slight increase in the supply of steel.

Instead of side windows it was supplied with flexible celluloid-glazed side curtains with a hole for hand signals and, when deployed, flimsy synthetic roofing over a light metal frame. It shared that car's 2.5 L 100 hp (75 kW) engine, and could reach 100 mph (160 km/h).

Just over 500 were built from 1948 until 1951.

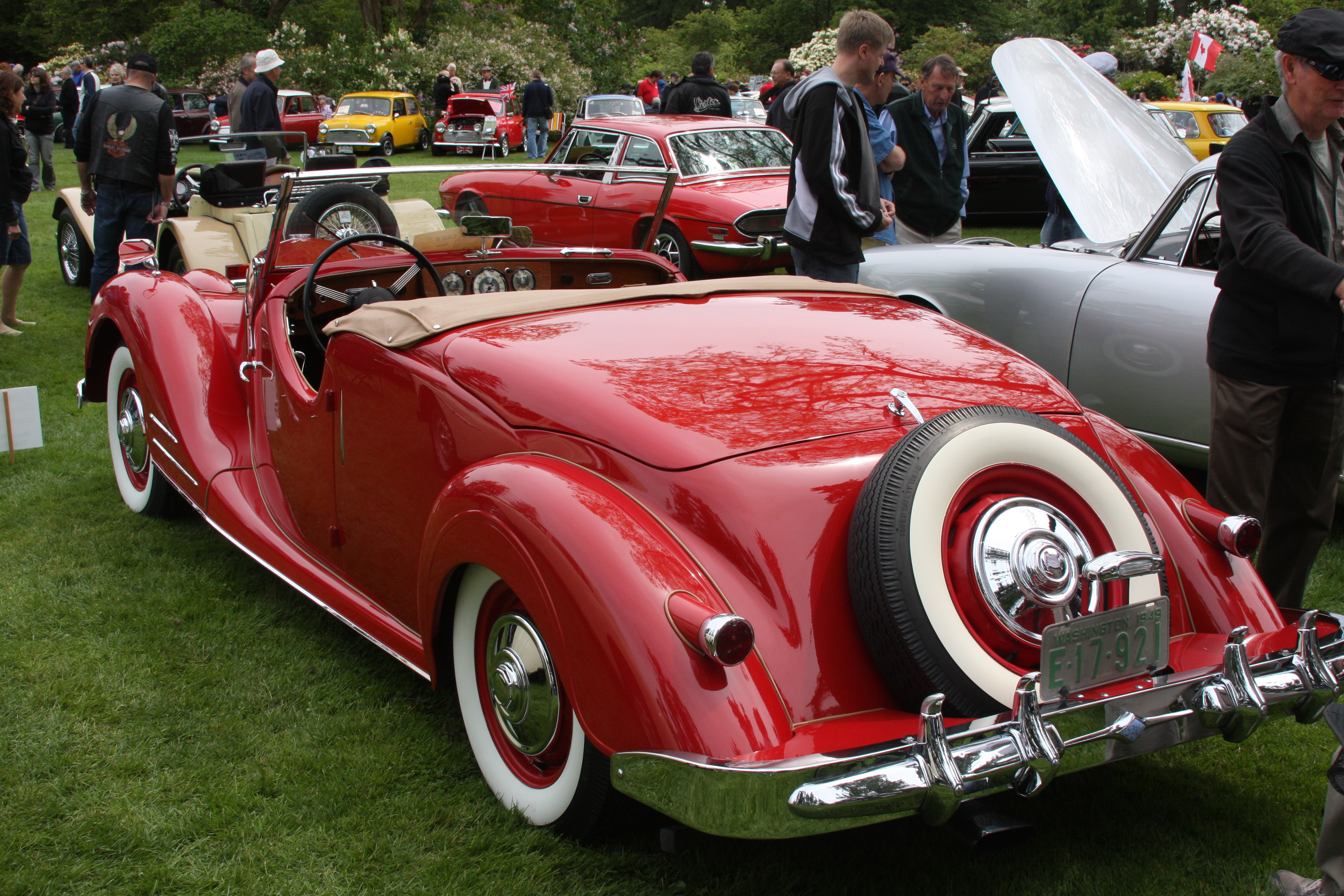
1948 RMC in Canada

The car's front and rear resemble the 1934 Ford V8.

== Riley RMD ==
Riley RMD
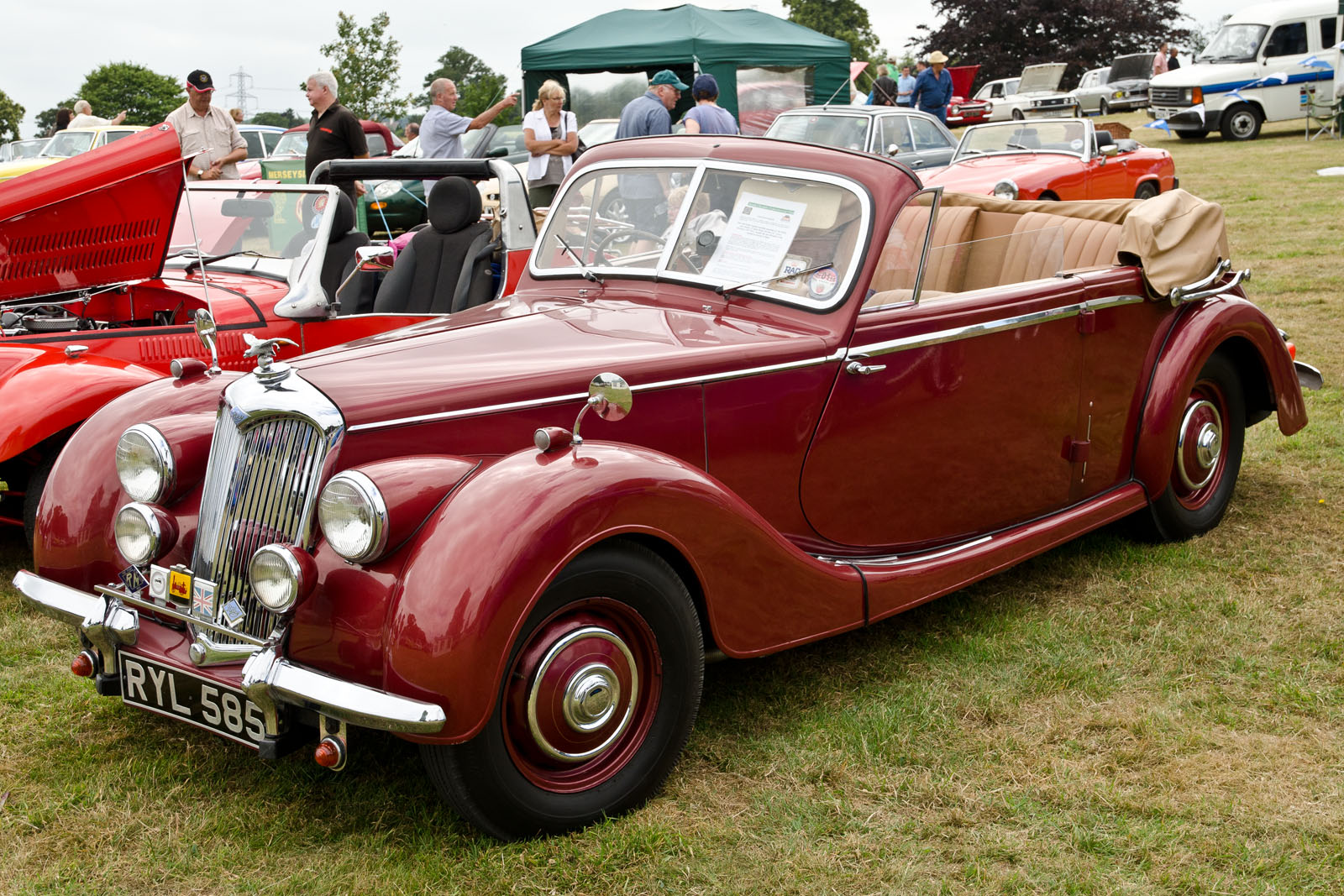
- 1950 RMD

Overview
- Production: 1949–1951; 502 produced

Body and chassis
- Body style: 2-door cabriolet

Powertrain
- Engine: 2.5 L Straight-4

The RMD (drophead) is a traditional 2-door cabriolet, and was the last Riley cabriolet. It uses the same 2.5 L 100 hp (75 kW) engine as the RMB, on which it was based. Just over 500 were produced between 1949 and 1951.

This model was first displayed in October 1948 at London's Earls Court Motor Show.

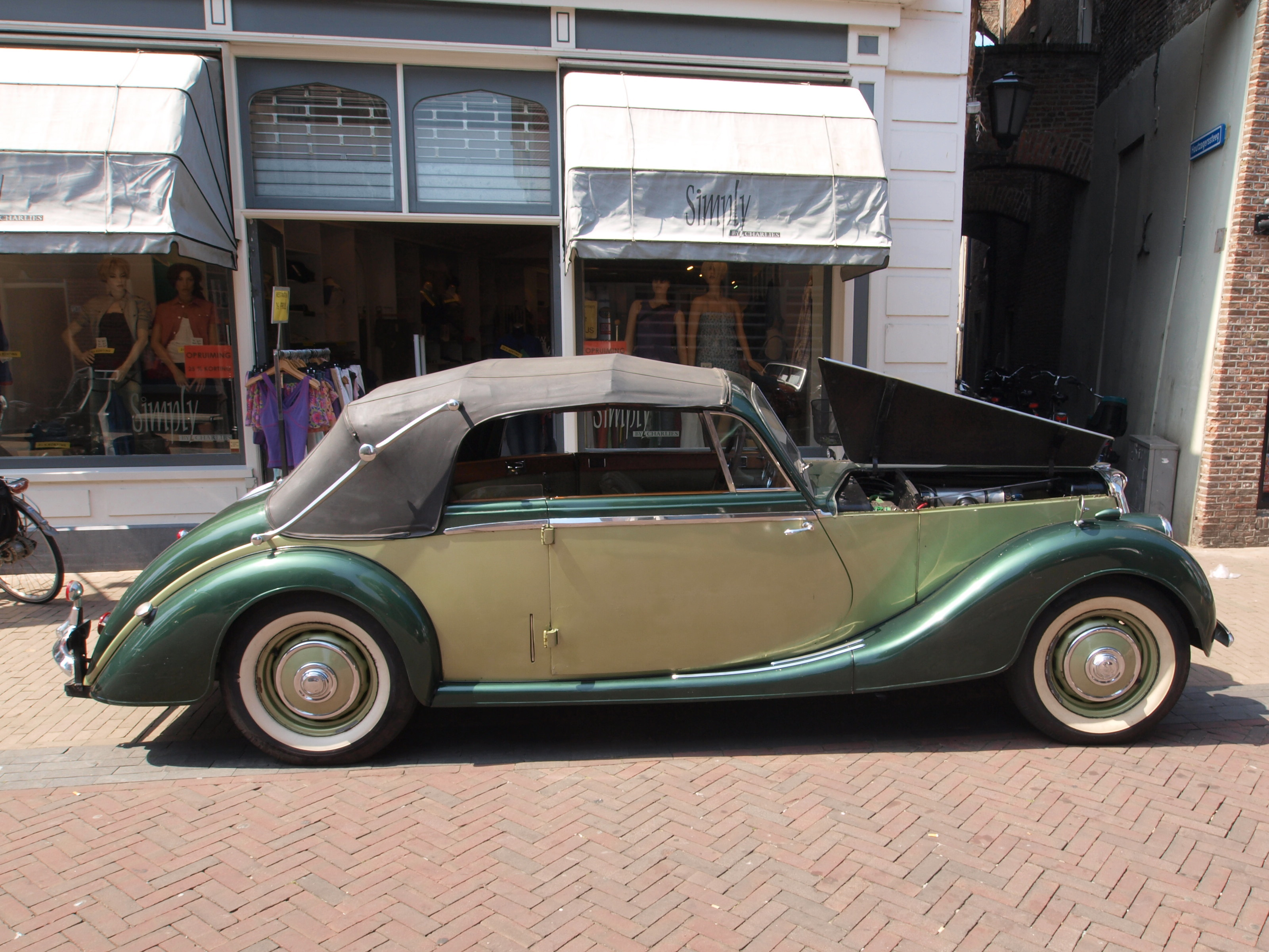
1950 Riley RMD

A cabriolet has fixed sides to its roof, called cant rails, and a folding top that remains attached to the vehicle. In a cabriolet like this Riley RMD the tops of the fixed sides, the cant rails, the beams over the side-windows, may be folded along with the top. While the hood is being opened or closed the heavy cant rail beams are supported by exterior hood irons. The hood irons, an elongated S-shape when the roof is up, may be seen at each of the roof's rear quarters.

A more English name for a folding cover or canopy of a (horse drawn) vehicle enabling the occupants to be seen clearly is a "head" or for motor vehicles in the mid-20th century drop head.

== Riley RME ==
Riley RME
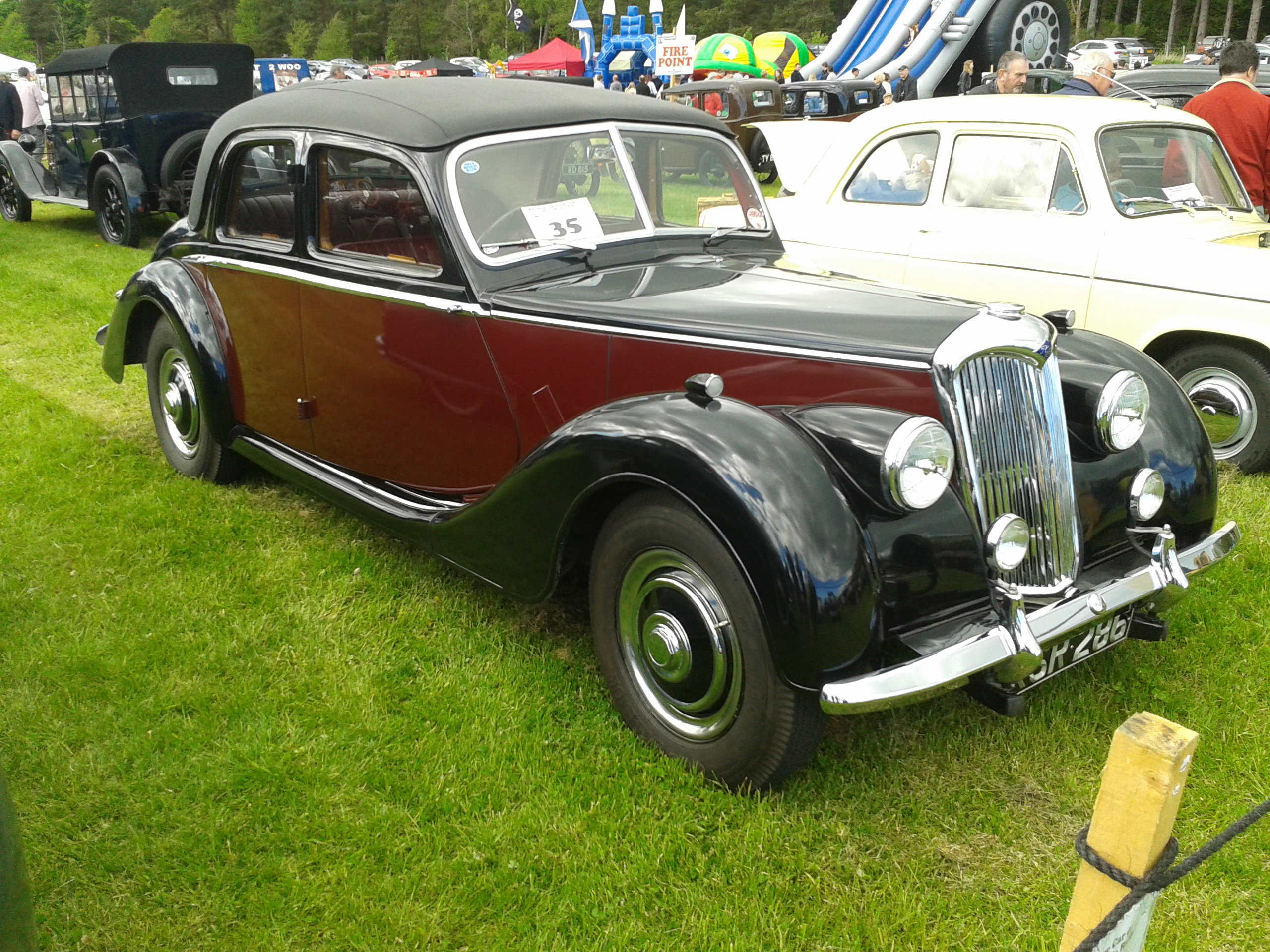
- 1953 RME

Overview
- Production: 1952–1955; 3446 produced

Body and chassis
- Body style: 4-door saloon

Powertrain
- Engine: 1.5 L Straight-4

Chronology
- Predecessor: Riley RMA
- Successor: Riley One-Point-Five (1957)

Launched in 1952, the RME was an improved RMA. It uses the same 1.5 L four-cylinder engine, and has a fully hydraulic braking system. The body has a larger rear window, with curved glass. To improve acceleration, the rear axle ratio was changed from 4.89:1 to 5.125:1.

When the 2.5 L (2443 cc) RMF ended production in October 1953, many details of the RME were revised. These included dispensing with running boards, and introducing entirely re-shaped front wings.

The RME was discontinued in 1955. It was succeeded in 1957 by the Riley One-Point-Five, which had been designed as a replacement for the Morris Minor, but never launched as such. This is a BMC design, unrelated to the RM series. It is much shorter than the RME, and was also badge-engineered as the Wolseley 1500, and in Australia as the Morris Major and Austin Lancer.

An RME tested by The Motor magazine in 1952 had a top speed of 75 mph (121 km/h) and could accelerate from 0 to 60 mph (97 km/h) in 29.5 seconds. A fuel consumption of 24.2 mpg_{‑imp} (11.7 L/100 km; 20.2 mpg_{‑US}) was recorded. The test car cost £1,339 including taxes.

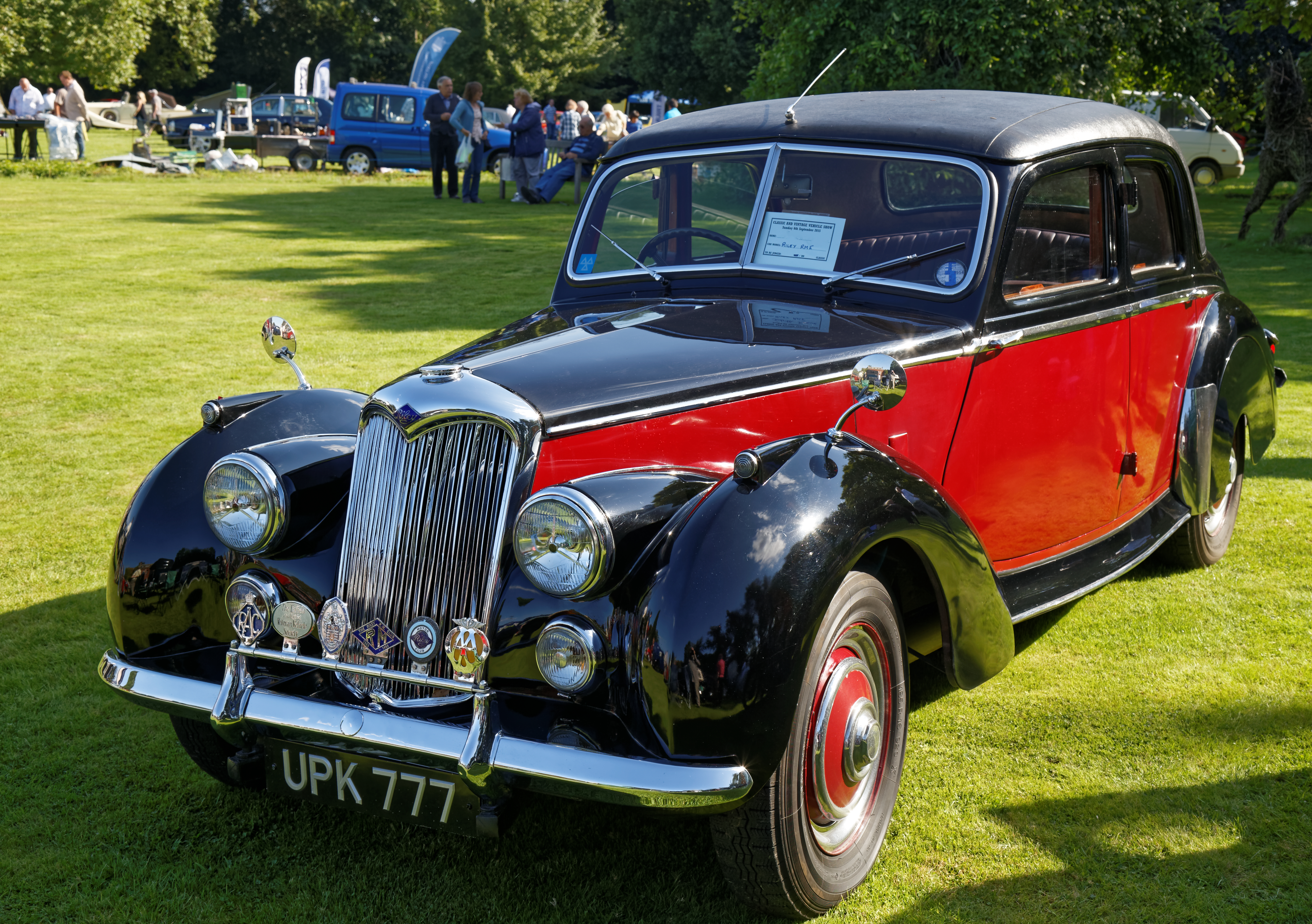
1954 RME with reshaped mudguards all round, and no running boards

== Riley RMF ==
Riley RMF
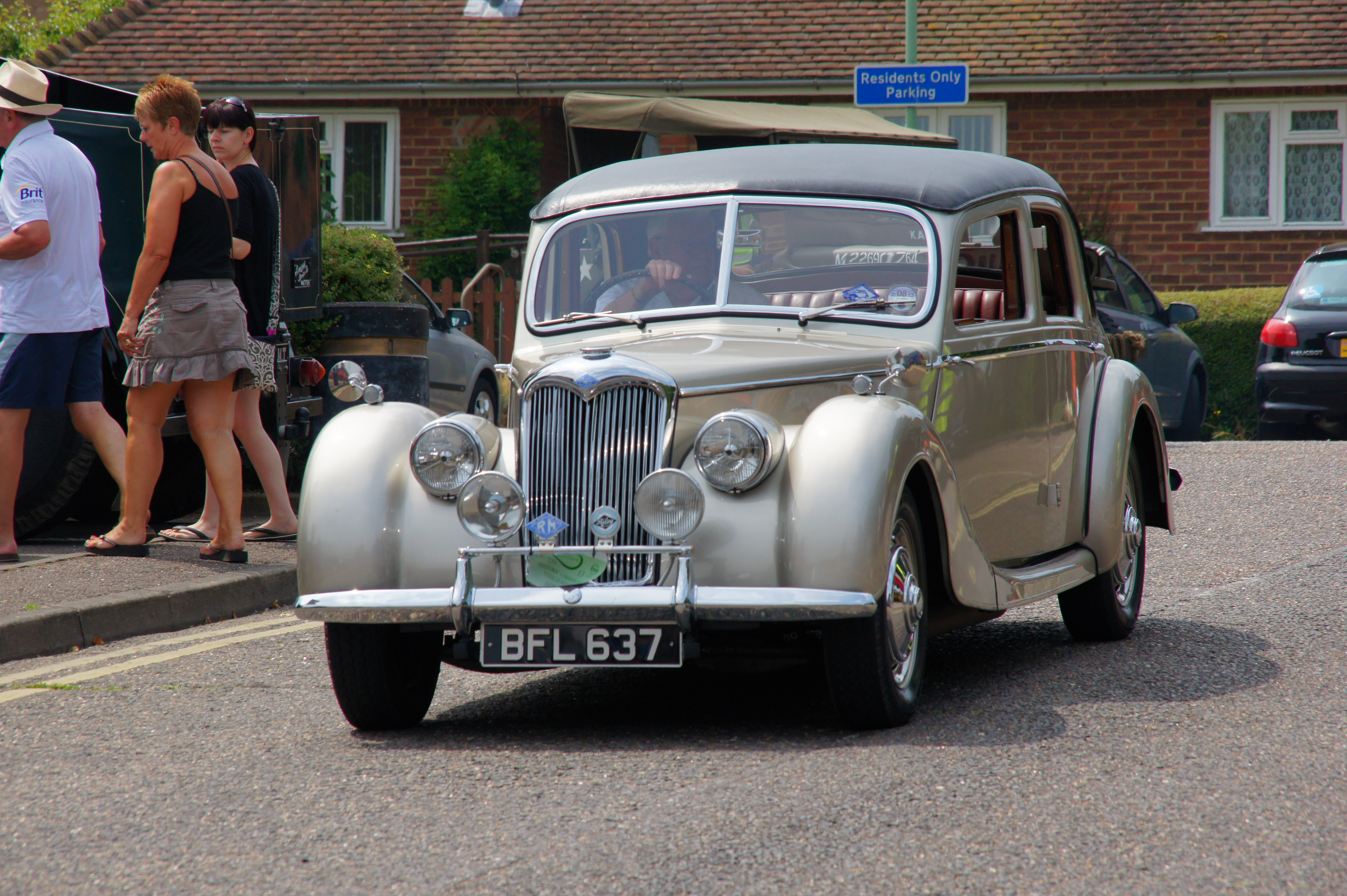
- 1953 RMF

Overview
- Production: 1952–1953; 1050 produced

Body and chassis
- Body style: 4-door saloon

Powertrain
- Engine: 2.5 L Straight-4

Chronology
- Predecessor: Riley RMB
- Successor: Riley Pathfinder

The RMF replaced the RMB in 1952. It has the same 2.5 L Big Four engine, plus mechanical updates shared with the RME. RMF 2½ Litre models have light blue bonnet and boot-lid badges, whereas the RME 1½ Litre models have dark blue badges. In 1953 the RMH Riley Pathfinder replaced the RMF. This is the last car built with the Riley Big Four engine, and is thus considered to be the last "real" Riley by purists. It continued in production until 1957.

== Riley 2½-litre Big Four engine ==
The Big Four engine is a four cylinder 2.5 litre engine rated at 16.07 h.p. under the British RAC formula. It was designed in a matter of months, under difficult financial conditions, and announced in the summer of 1937. It followed existing Riley practice, similar to their 1.5 litre engine, but with each cylinder completely surrounded by a water jacket. The fully counter-weighted and balanced crankshaft ran in three main bearings. Pre-war power output was at first 80 bhp (60 kW), then raised to 85 bhp (63 kW). In its final Riley Pathfinder form, it developed 110 bhp (82 kW), and was produced until the end of Riley Pathfinder production in February 1957.

Riley 2½-litre Big Four engine

Overview
- Manufacturer: Riley Motors
- Also called: Riley 16 h.p., Riley 16/4
- Production: 1937–1957

Layout
- Configuration: straight four
- Displacement: 2.443 L (149.1 cu in)
- Cylinder bore: 80.5 mm (3.17 in)
- Piston stroke: 120 mm (4.7 in)
- Cylinder block material: cast iron, aluminium sump, alloy pistons
- Cylinder head material: cast iron, hemispherical combustion chambers, spark plugs in centre between valve covers
- Valvetrain: 90-degree angled overhead valves operated by twin high-lift camshafts moving rockers with short light stiff push-rods powered from the crankshaft by duplex roller chains
- Compression ratio: 6.9 : 1

Combustion
- Fuel system: Twin H4 SU carburettors mechanical petrol pump
- Fuel type: petrol
- Oil system: pressure fed from sump by submerged gear-type pump driven by skew gear from camshaft
- Cooling system: water, thermostatically controlled flow, belt-driven water pump and radiator fan

Output
- Power output: 106 bhp @ 4,500 rpm Tax rating 16hp

Chronology
- Predecessor: none before 1937
- Successor: Riley RMH then BMC C-Series engine

== Bibliography ==
- Ramsey, John (1984). The Swapmeet and Toyfair Catalogue of British Diecast Model Toys. Swapmeet Toys and Models Ltd. p. 29. ISBN 978-0950931906.
- Sedgwick, Michael; Gillies, Mark (1989). A-Z of Cars 1945–1970. Motorbooks International. ISBN 1-870979-39-7.
- Taylor, James (1989). Riley RM-Series. Motor Racing Publications. ISBN 978-0947981365.
- Williams, John Price (2005). Riley: The Legendary RMs. Crowood Press. ISBN 978-1861267610.
