= Riley 12 =

Riley 12hp
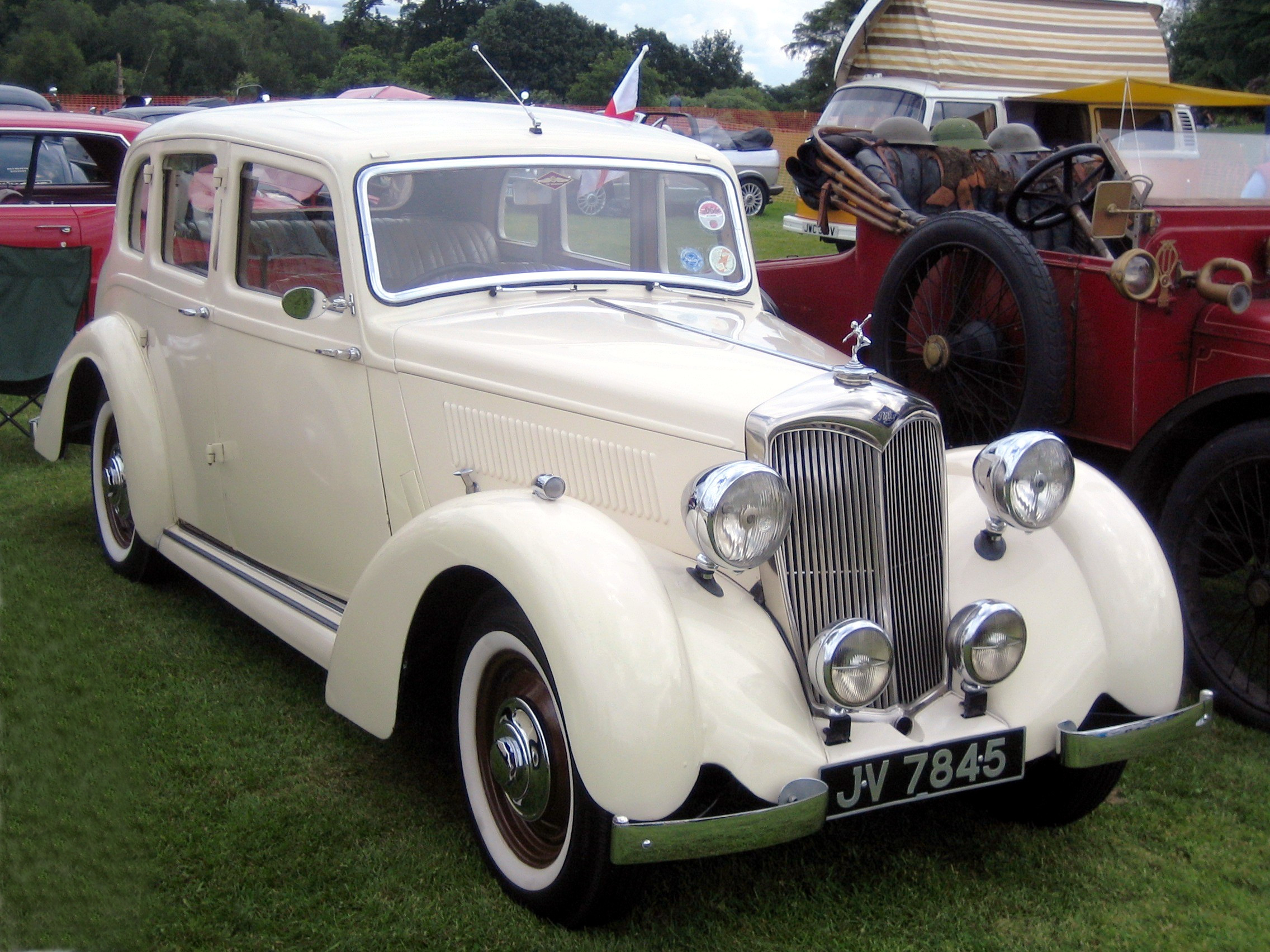
- six-light saloon registered May 1939

Overview
- Manufacturer: Riley (Coventry) Limited
- Production: 1939-1940

Body and chassis
- Body style: 6-light saloon; 2-door drophead coupé; chassis only
- Layout: FR layout
- Related: Wolseley 12-48

Powertrain
- Engine: 1496 cm3 Sprite engine £25 extra
- Transmission: 4 speed synchromesh (except on 1st) and torque tube

Dimensions
- Wheelbase: 2,743.2 mm (108 in); track 1,308.1 mm (51.5 in)
- Length: 4,343.4 mm (171 in)
- Width: 1,600.2 mm (63 in)
- Kerb weight: 1,219 kg (2,688 lb)

Chronology
- Predecessor: Riley 1½-litre
- Successor: Riley RMA

Riley 12 engine

Layout
- Configuration: Straight 4-cylinder
- Displacement: 1,496 cc (91.3 cu in)
- Cylinder bore: 69 mm (2.72 in)
- Piston stroke: 100 mm (3.94 in)
- Cylinder block material: cast iron mounted on rubber cushions
- Valvetrain: overhead valves set at 90 degrees operated by twin camshafts

Combustion
- Fuel system: SU carburetter
- Cooling system: water by pump and thermostat

Output
- Power output: 51 bhp (38 kW; 52 PS) @4800 rpm; Tax horsepower 11.81

The Riley 12 was a medium-sized premium priced saloon or drophead coupé (also available as a bare chassis) which was available from mid 1939 though it was not announced by The Motor magazine as a new car until July 1939. Production ended in 1940 and the model was not revived after the war.

== Bankruptcy ==
Directly after the bankruptcy of Riley, the company's assets came into the hands of the Nuffield Corporation which drastically pruned and rationalized the Riley model range, utilizing components from the MG/Morris/Wolseley parts bin. This was one of three Riley models produced following that exercise until World War II put an end to Riley production, alongside the 16hp version with the same body and the 16hp Kestrel.

== Design ==
Riley still retained a lot of autonomy after their acquisition by Lord Nuffield and this car was Riley's attempt to keep up with the fashions of the late thirties with helmet-style front mudguards and a bigger boot and slightly heavy styling. In many ways it was an update of the earlier 1936 Monaco and Adelphi models. The Adelphi in particular had been very successful for Riley and so it made sense to carry this theme forward with the new model. Underneath the new body the car was an updated Riley Victor chassis (basically a Merlin chassis) with some cost savings and also some improvements. With access to the Nuffield parts bin, Riley could adopt the MG/Wolseley synchro gearbox in place of the American Borg Warner overdrive box in place of the Riley sector box. The engine, though still with gear driven camshafts, had an improved water pump. Negatives were the adoption of an umbrella style handbrake under the dash. Brake drums were smaller at 11 inches rather than the 13 inches of previous 12/4s. Springs now had rubber rather than bronze bushings.

The steering was by Bishop Cam, the column adjustable for length. Springs were still semi-elliptic fore and aft. Brakes were still by the Girling rod system.

== Road test ==
John Prioleau reviewed the car for The Observer. He described it as a compact car but not crowded, with plenty of room for four full-sized people. Front seats a little too upright. Nicest looking dashboard on any 1939 car. This saloon is not fast but it can cruise within 5 mph of its maximum (he reached an indicated 67 mph). The steering was light and responsive.

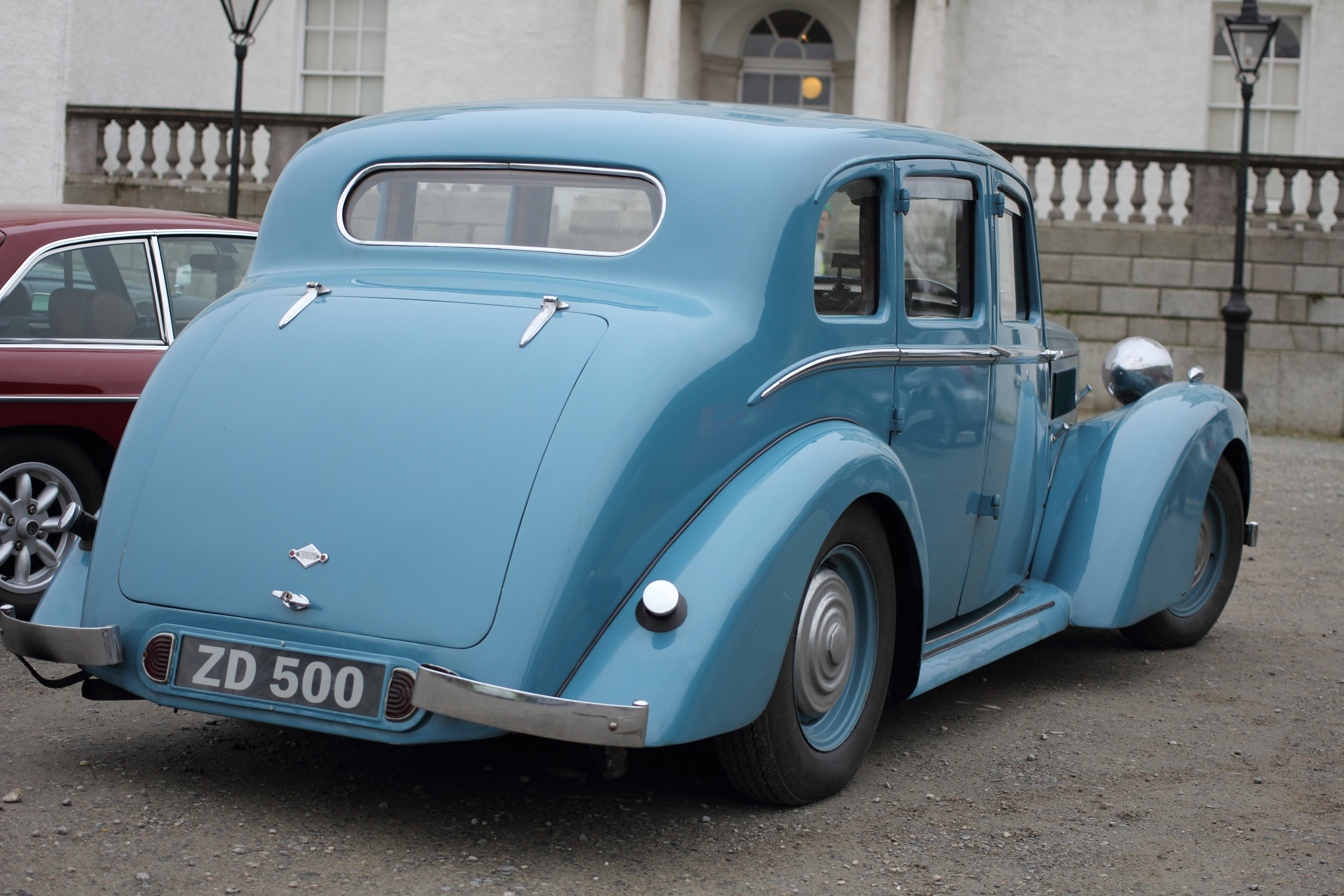

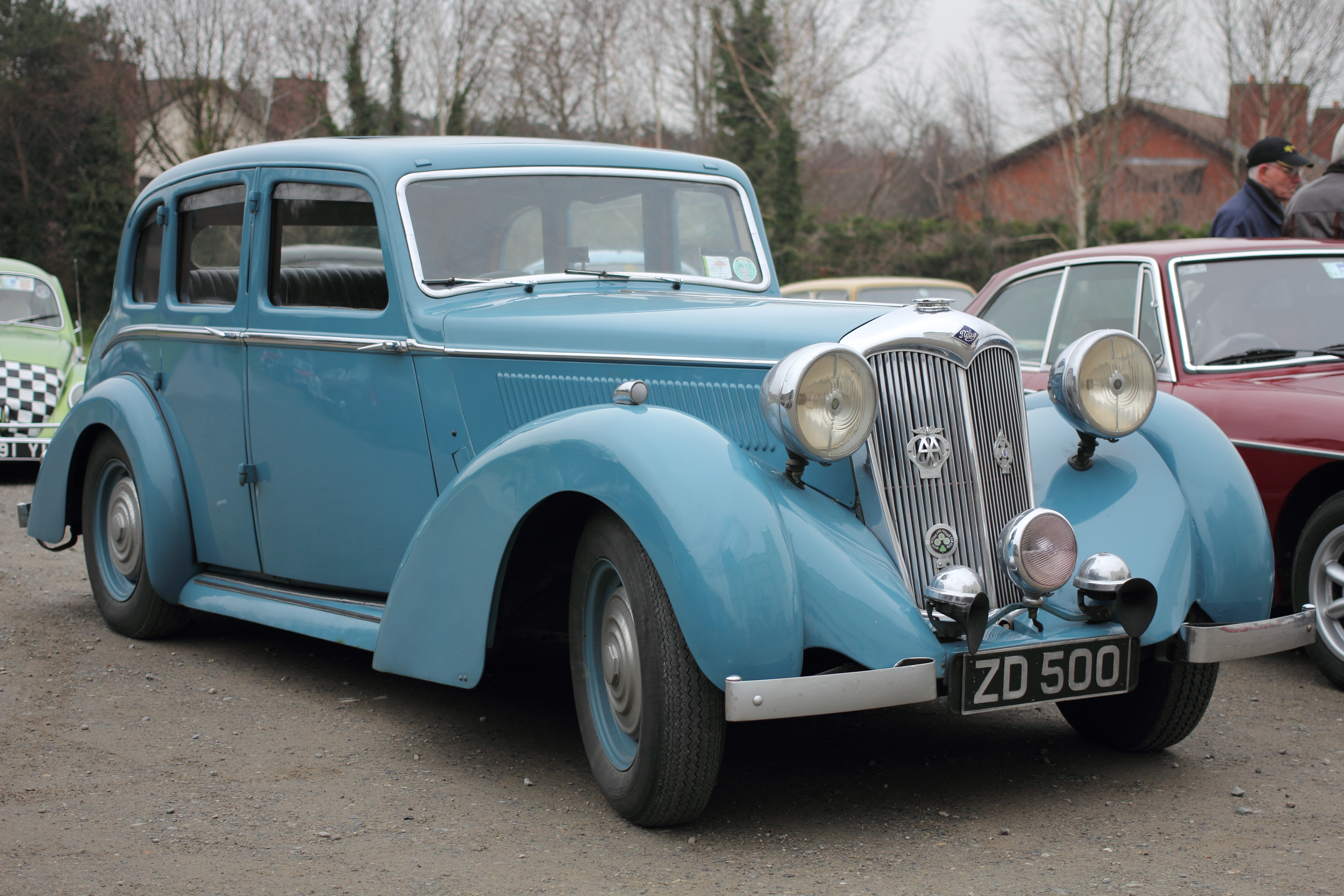
