= Riley 12/4 =

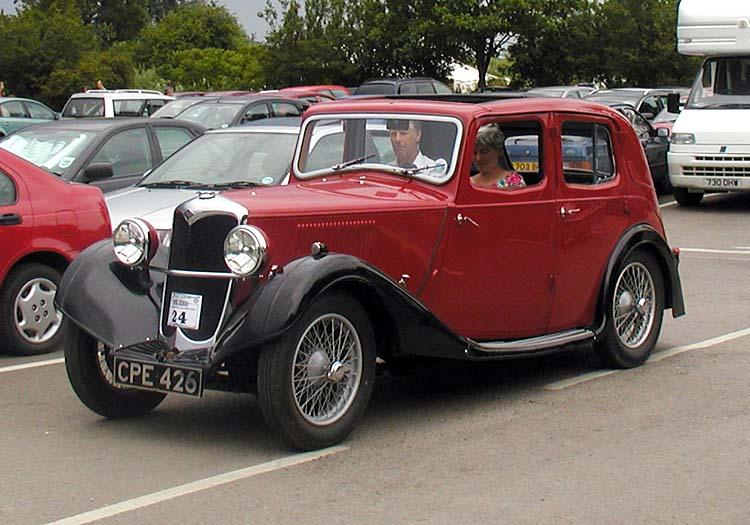
- 12/4 with Falcon body registered March 1935

Overview
- Manufacturer: Riley
- Production: 1935–1938
- Assembly: United Kingdom: Coventry, England
- Designer: Percy & Stanley Riley

Body and chassis
- Class: Midsize sports saloon and until 1938 2-seater
- Body style: Saloon, Tourer, Two-Seater, Racer

Powertrain
- Engine: 1,496 cc (91.3 cu in) Straight 4 OHV
- Transmission: Preselector, crash box, manual

Dimensions
- Wheelbase: 106 in (2,692 mm), 109 in (2,769 mm) or 112 in (2,845 mm)
- Width: 58 in (1,473 mm) to 61 in (1,549 mm)

Chronology
- Predecessor: Riley 12/6
- Successor: Riley One-Point-Five

The Riley 12/4, or from 1936 the Riley 1½-litre, is a range of cars made from 1935 to 1938 by the British Riley company available with saloon, touring, and sports/racing coachwork,

== Engineering ==
The car is powered by a four-cylinder 1,496 cc (91.3 cu in) "12/4 Engine" with one or two Zenith carburettors. Designed by Hugh Rose, it was based on the Riley Nine engine but with some significant changes including the cylinder block and crankcase being cast as one unit. It was advanced for its day with twin camshafts mounted high in the engine block, cross flow head on some versions, and Zenith or twin SU carburettors.

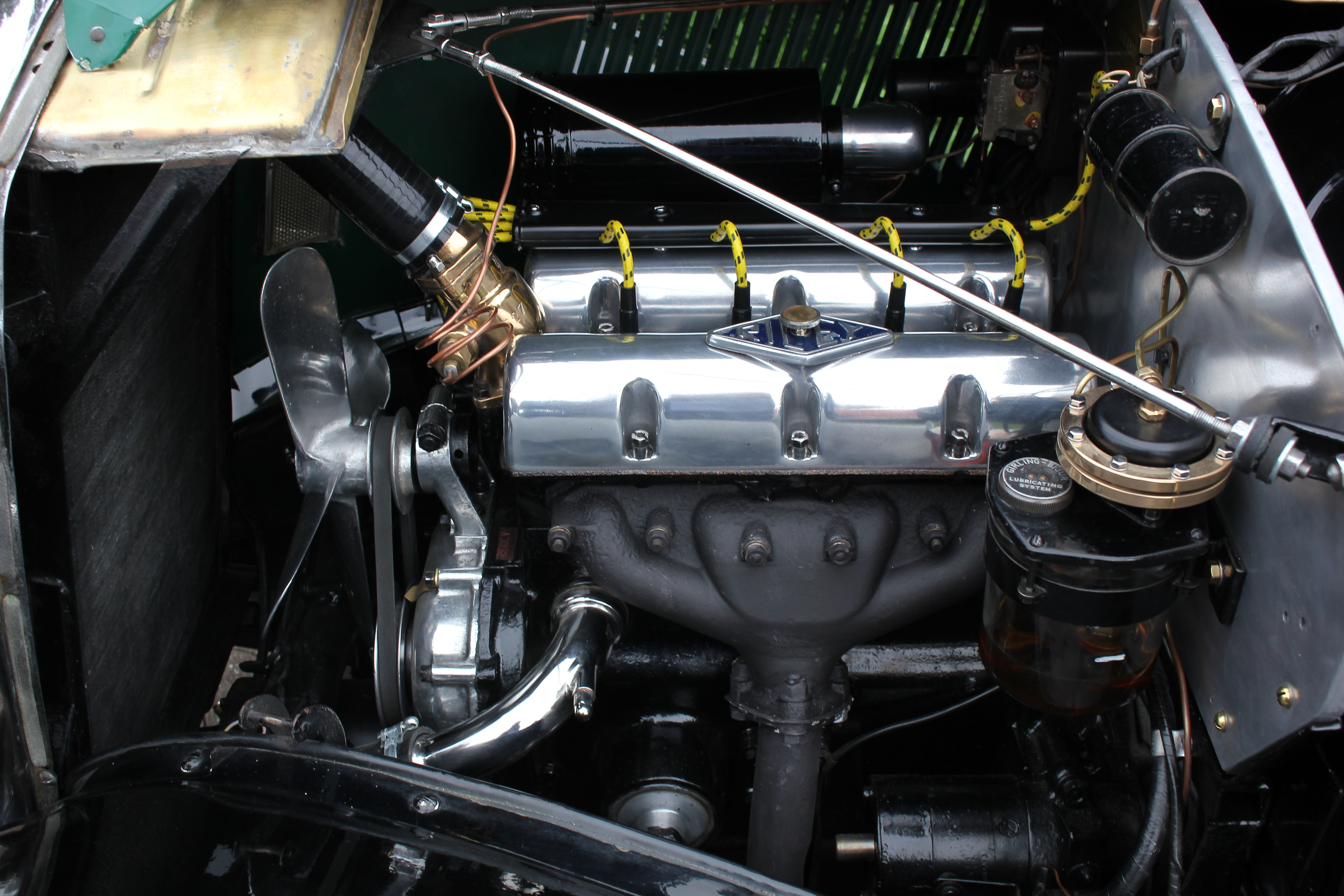
Engine in a 1935 Adelphi saloon

Production of the engine continued until 1955 and also powered cars sold under these model names in these model years:

- Riley 12 1939 to 1940
- Riley RMA and then Riley RME 1946 to 1955
- Riley One-Point-Five 1957 to 1965 used a BMC B-Series engine

The chassis had half-elliptic leaf springs all round and drive was to the rear wheels through either a four-speed preselector or manual gearbox. Girling rod brakes were fitted. Three different wheelbases were made and two track options of 48 in (1,219 mm) on most versions or 51 in (1,295 mm) on the 1936 Adelphi, Continental and Kestrel saloons.

== Coachwork ==
At launch three body styles were available: the Kestrel 4 light fastback saloon, the Falcon saloon and the Lynx open tourer. In 1936 the Kestrel became a six light, the Falcon was replaced by the Adelphi six light saloon and the Continental touring saloon was introduced.

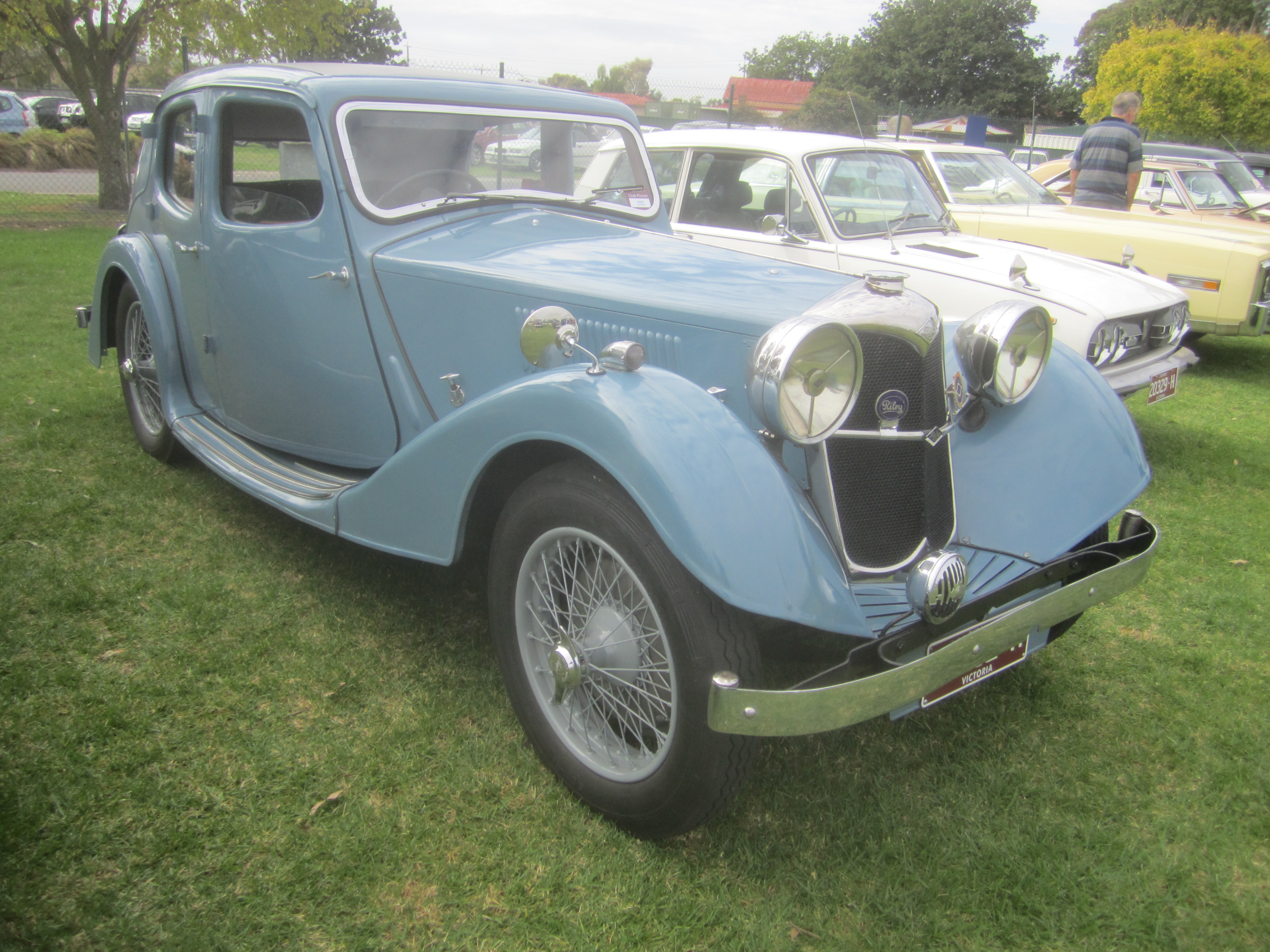
1934 12/4 with Kestrel body
