= Riley One-Point-Five =

Riley One-Point-Five Wolseley 1500
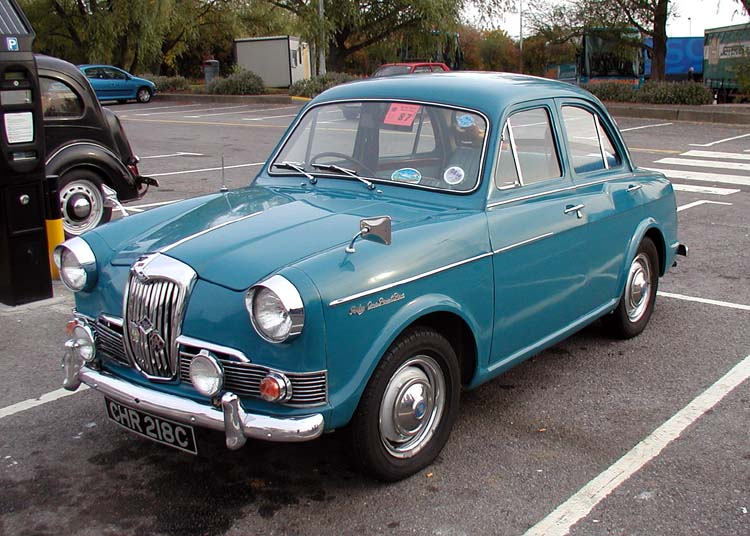
- 1965 Riley One-Point-Five Saloon

Overview
- Manufacturer: BMC
- Production: 1957–1965; Riley: 19,568 made Wolseley: 103,394 made
- Assembly: United Kingdom; Australia: Victoria Park (Wolseley only)

Body and chassis
- Class: Compact executive car
- Body style: 4-door saloon
- Related: Morris Major; Austin Lancer; Ogle SX1000

Powertrain
- Engine: 1,489 cc (90.9 cu in) B-Series Straight-4
- Transmission: 4-speed manual synchromesh on top 3 ratios

Dimensions
- Wheelbase: 86 in (2,184 mm)
- Length: 152 in (3,861 mm))
- Width: 60.5 in (1,537 mm)
- Height: 59.5 in (1,511 mm)
- Curb weight: 2,072 lb (940 kg)

Chronology
- Predecessor: Riley RME/Wolseley 15/50
- Successor: Riley Kestrel/Wolseley 1100/1300

The Riley One-Point-Five and similar Wolseley 1500 are cars produced by Riley and Wolseley respectively from 1957 until 1965. They used the Morris Minor floor pan, suspension and steering but were fitted with the larger 1,489 cc (90.9 cu in) B-Series engine and MG Magnette gearbox.

== Model series ==
=== Series 1 ===
The two models were differentiated by nearly 20 hp (15 kW), the Riley having twin SU carburettors giving it the more power at 68 hp (50 kW). The Wolseley was released in April 1957 and the Riley was launched in November, directly after the 1957 London Motor Show.

=== Series 2 ===
The Series II was released in May 1960. The most notable external difference was the hidden boot and bonnet hinges. Interior storage was improved with the fitting of a full-width parcel shelf directly beneath the fascia.

=== Series 3 ===
The Series III was introduced in October 1961, featuring revisions to the grille and front and rear lights.

In October 1962 the cars received the more robust crank, bearing and other details of the larger 1,622 cc unit now being fitted in the Austin Cambridge and its "Farina" styled clones. Unlike the Farina models the Wolseley 1500 and Riley One-Point-Five retained the 1,489cc engine size with which they had been launched back in 1957.

=== Production volumes ===
Production ended in 1965 with 19,568 Rileys and 103,394 Wolseleys made.

== Gallery ==
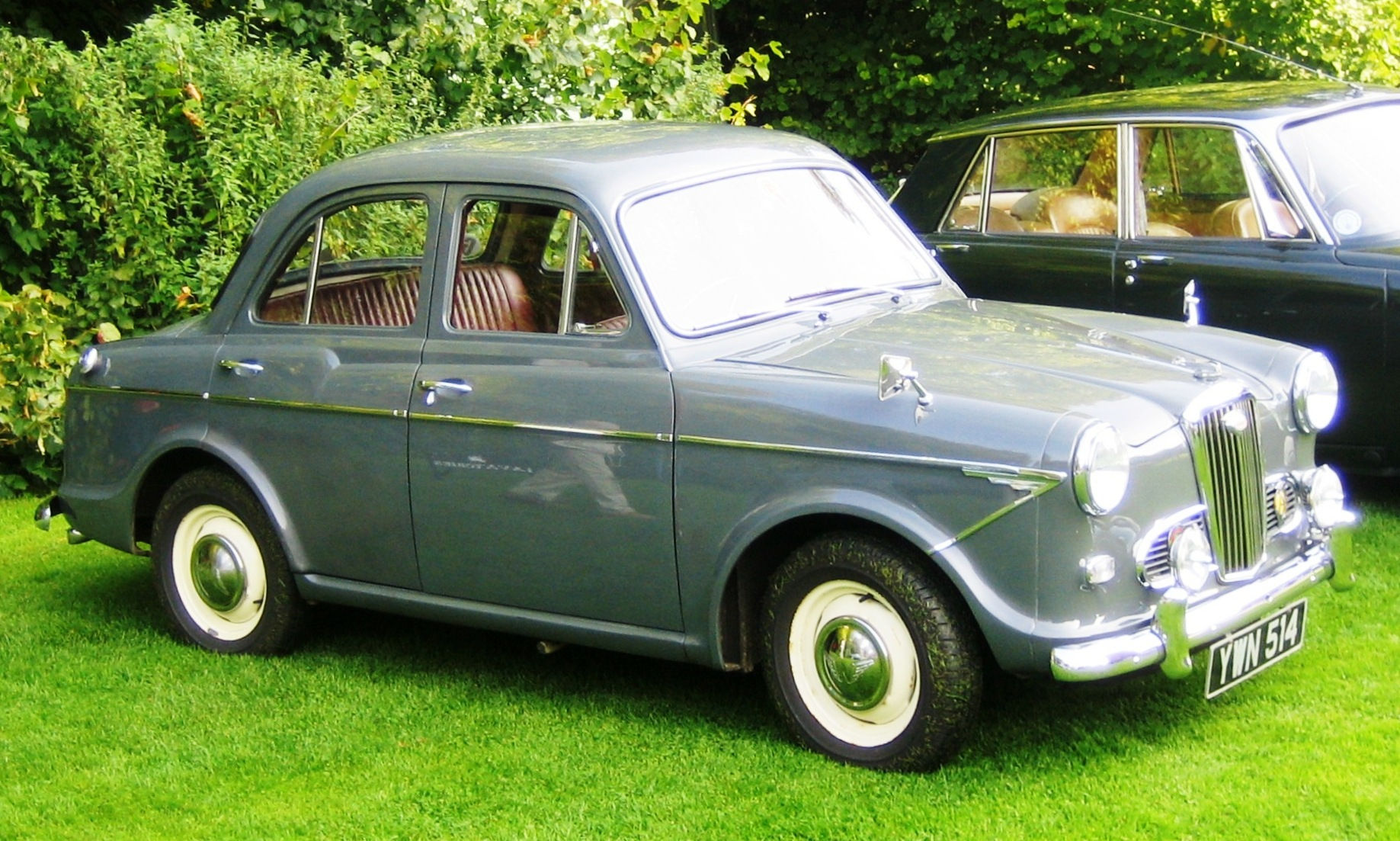
1961 Wolseley 1500 Saloon

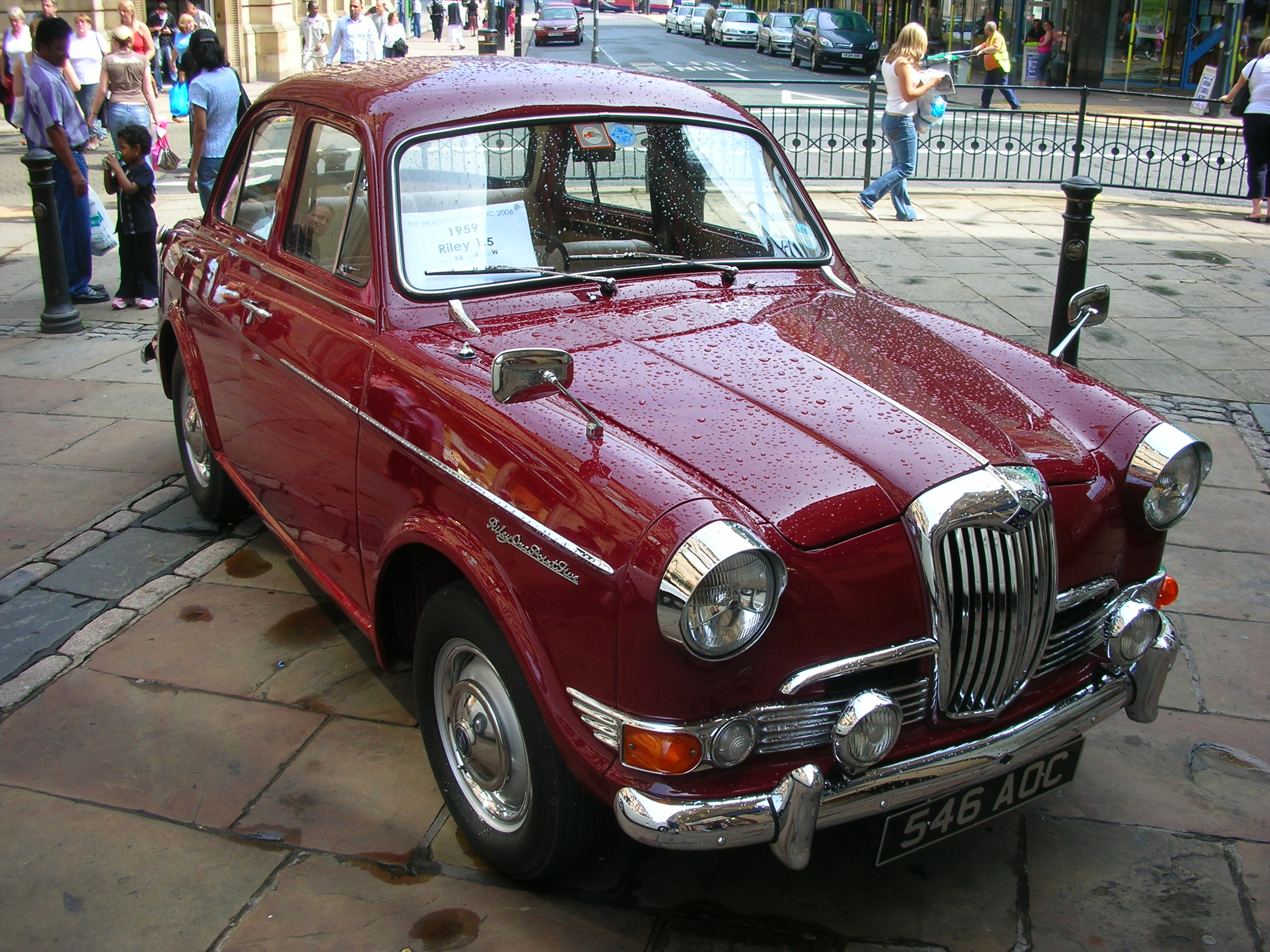
1959 Riley One-Point-Five

== Engines ==
- 1.2 L (1200 cc) B-Series I4, Irish Market only (Wolseley)
- 1.5 L (1489 cc) B-Series I4, 50 bhp (37 kW) (Wolseley) & 68 bhp (51 kW) (Riley)

== Differences ==
The One-Point-Five and its 1500 sibling had a number of differences, with the Wolseley generally being the less well-equipped model:

- Engine - The Riley benefited from twin 1½ inch SU H4 carburettors while the Wolseley was fitted with a single 1¼ inch SU carburettor. The cylinder head on the Riley was also slightly sportier to help with the power increase.
- Exterior - The front panel and grille looks similar on both cars, but is different. The stainless trim along the side of the cars is also different.
- Interior - Both cars received wooden dashboards. While the Riley had a full complement of gauges (speedometer, tachometer, and temp/oil/fuel) placed directly in front of the driver, the Wolseley made do with only the speedometer and temp/oil/fuel gauges, which were placed in the centre of the dashboard. The Riley was fitted with leather seats, while the Wolseley was often fitted with lower quality Rexine in its Fleet model.
- Brakes - The Riley was equipped with a larger Girling braking system, while the Wolseley received a smaller Lockheed system. The Girling brakes on the Riley One-Point-Five were often sought out by Morris Minor owners looking for a way to upgrade their brakes.

== Performance ==
A Wolseley 1500 was tested by the British magazine The Motor in 1957. It was found to have a top speed of 76.7 mph (123.4 km/h) and could accelerate from 0-60 mph (97 km/h) in 24.8 seconds. A fuel consumption of 36.6 miles per imperial gallon (7.7 L/100 km; 30.5 mpg_{‑US}) was recorded. The test car cost £758 including taxes of £253.

A Riley One-Point-Five was tested by the British magazine The Motor in 1961. It was found to have a top speed of 82.4 mph (132.6 km/h) and could accelerate from 0-60 mph (97 km/h) in 18.9 seconds. A fuel consumption of 29.8 miles per imperial gallon (9.5 L/100 km; 24.8 mpg_{‑US}) was recorded. The test car cost £815 including taxes of £240.

In its day, the Riley was successfully raced and rallied and can still be seen today in historical sporting events.

== Australian production ==
BMC Australia produced the Wolseley 1500 in Australia from 1958. It was built alongside BMC Australia's own versions of this design, the Morris Major and Austin Lancer. The Major and Lancer were less luxurious and had many notable differences from the Wolseley. The 1500 was discontinued in 1959 and substantially revised "Series 2" models of the Major and Lancer were released in the same year. In 1962 the Lancer and Major were replaced by the Morris Major Elite which was powered by a 1,622 cc (99.0 cu in) engine.

== North American exports ==
1959 Series I Riley One-Point-Fives were exported to North America by BMC in an attempt to capitalize on the growing imported car market. While not a sales success, a number of the cars remain on the road in the hands of collectors. As was a common practice in many jurisdictions, some cars were titled as 1960 model year cars because that was the year of their initial registration.

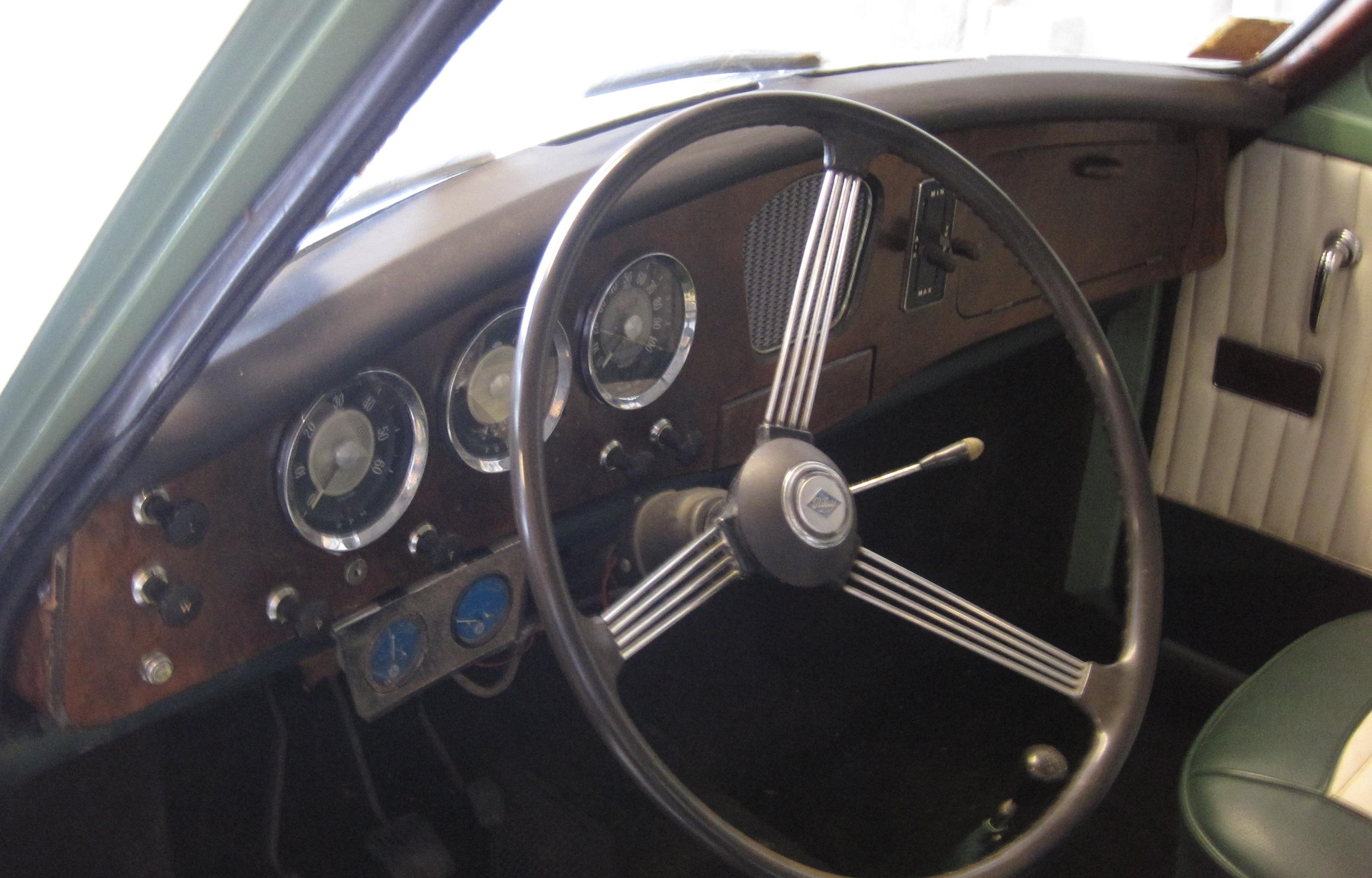
Riley 1.5 LHD dashboard

== Running changes ==
The badging for the One-Point-Five was changed early on in Series I production, after car number 4861 and before 6353. The earlier cars have smaller badges on the front wings and the boot lid. The later cars use simpler, larger badges with a different design and typeface.

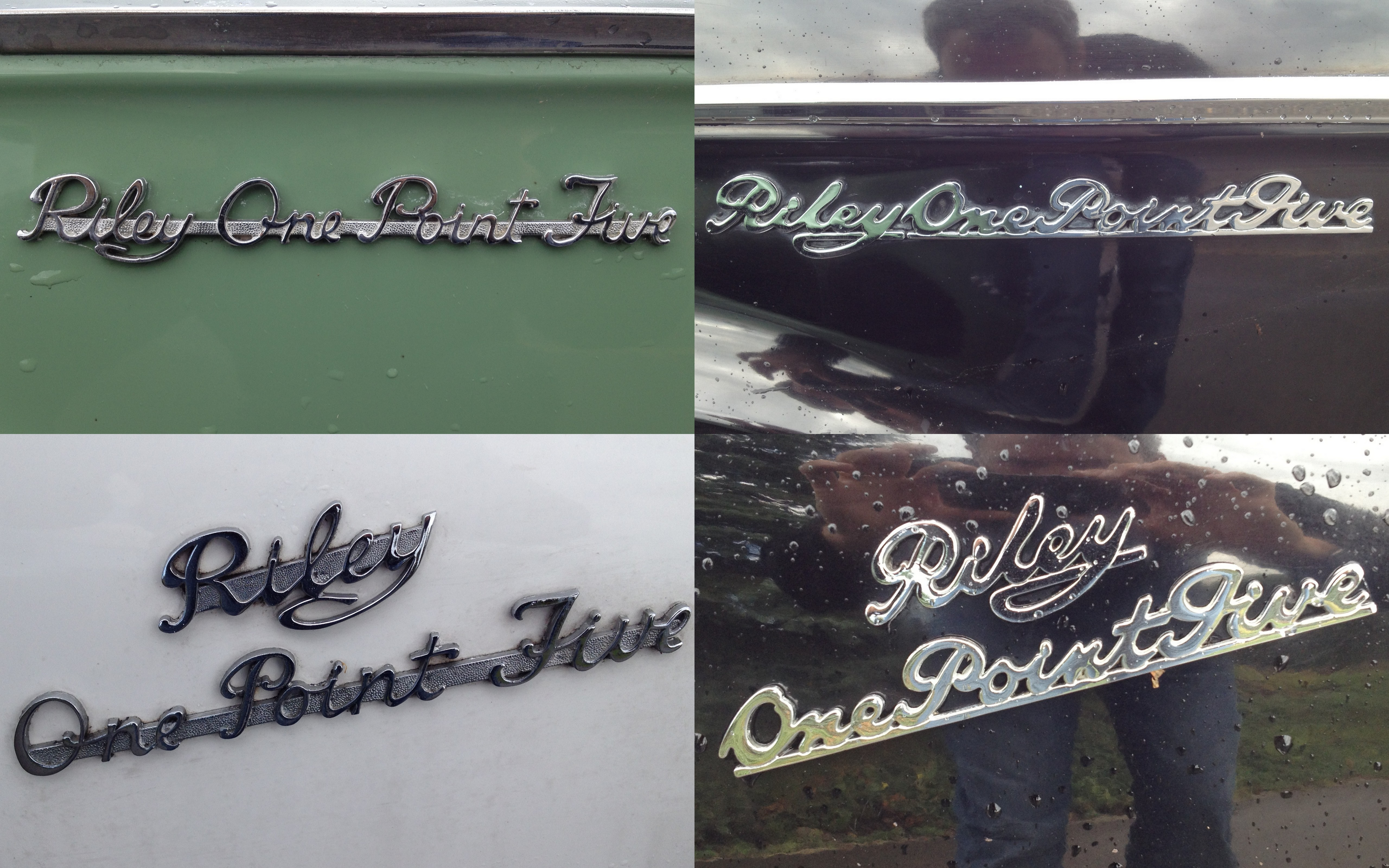
Early (left) & late (right) badges
