= Riley 12/6 =

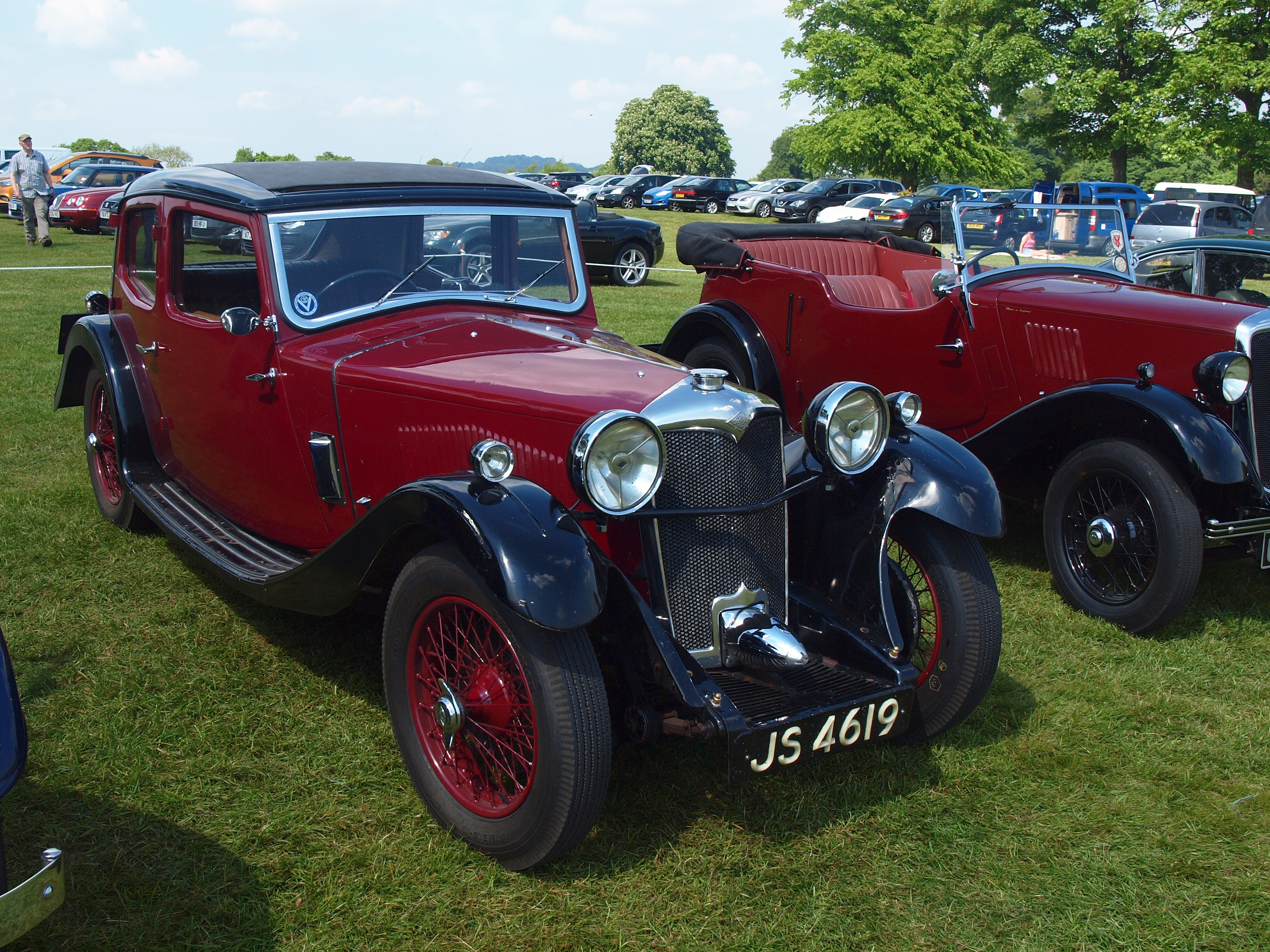
- 1934 Riley 12/6 Kestrel saloon

Overview
- Manufacturer: Riley
- Production: 1932–1935
- Designer: Percy and Stanley Riley

Body and chassis
- Body style: 4-door saloon 2-door coupe 2-door convertible

Powertrain
- Engine: 1.5 L Straight-6

Dimensions
- Wheelbase: 114 in (2,896 mm)

Chronology
- Predecessor: None
- Successor: Riley 12/4

The Riley 12/6 is a car that was made by the British Riley company from late 1932 (for the 1933 model year) to 1935.

It has a 1,458 cc straight-six engine with twin cams, and either single, twin or triple SU carburettors. The transmission is either a four speed manual or optional preselector gearbox. They had a top speed of around 70 mph (113 km/h). The chassis was a lengthened version of the one used on the Riley Nine.

They were available in a range of models: Mentone saloon, Kestrel saloon, Lincock fixed head coupé, Ascot drophead coupé with dickey seat, Lynx tourer, Falcon saloon, Gamecock tourer, March two-seat tourer, MPH two seater trial/sports 2-seater, and Trinity 3-position Drophead Coupé.

The 12/6 engine was designed to fit in between the 9 and 14/6 engines for trials and racing. The 9 was 1,087 cc, fitting in the 1,100 cc class, and the 14/6 was 1,633 cc, fitting in the over-1,500 cc class. A 1,486 cc "Brooklands Six" was developed to compete in the sub-1,500 cc International Class F, with two or three cars built in mid-1932. Another such engine was fitted to an Alpine Tourer for the 1932 Monte Carlo Rally, where it finished second in class. The 1,458 cc 12/6 was derived from the Brooklands Six. The slightly larger "Brooklands" engine continued to see some limited use, such as in the 1933 Riley Grebe prototype and in the TT Six.

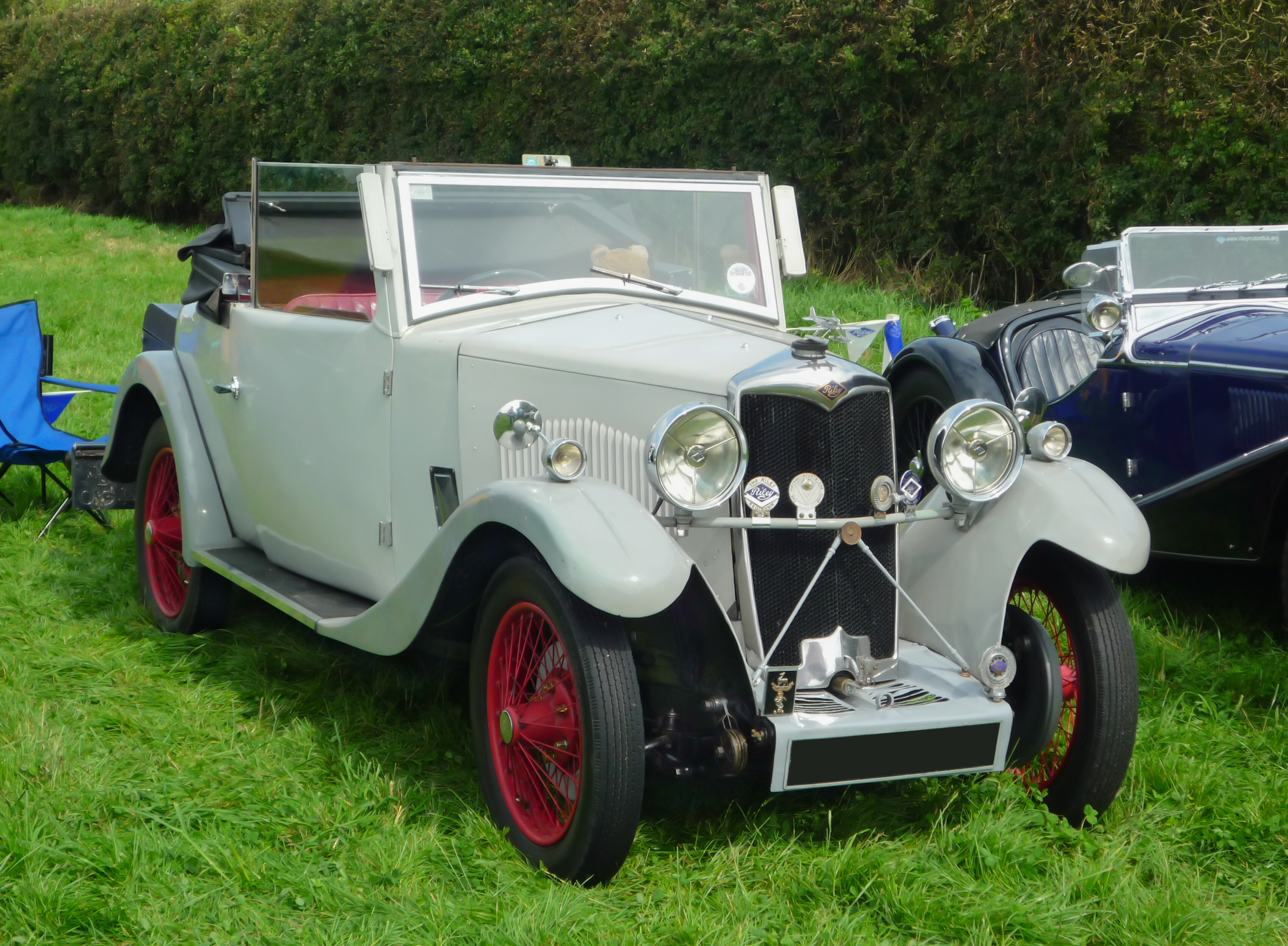
1933 Riley 12/6 Ascot drophead coupé

As the 14/6 was basically a 9 with two extra cylinders on the end, the 9 and 14/6 engines shared the same parts and spares. The 12/6 did not share parts with any other Riley, so many 12/6s have been bored out to the size of a 14/6, to compensate for lack of spares. All of these engines share the same 95.2 mm (3.75 in) stroke. The 12/6 has a 57 mm (2.24 in) bore, while the "Brooklands" competition engine has a 57.546 mm (2.27 in) mm bore.
