= Morris Major =

Morris Major Austin Lancer
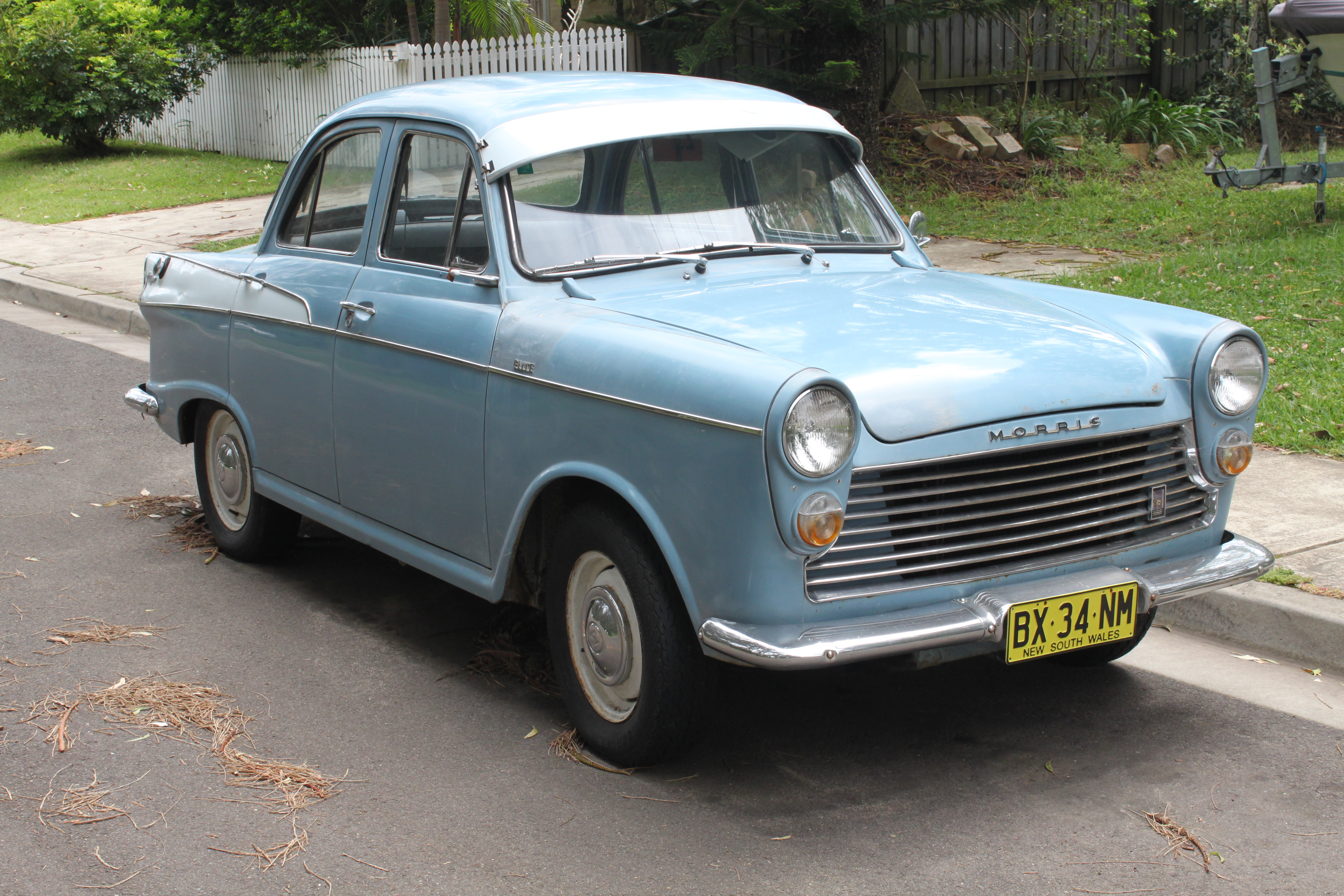
- Morris Major Elite

Overview
- Manufacturer: BMC Australia
- Production: 1958–1964
- Assembly: Australia: Victoria Park

Body and chassis
- Class: B-segment
- Body style: 4-door sedan
- Layout: FR layout
- Chassis: Unibody
- Related: Wolseley 1500/Riley One-Point-Five

Powertrain
- Engine: BMC B-Series engine, 1489 & 1622 cc
- Transmission: 4-speed manual, synchromesh on 2,3 & 4

Dimensions
- Wheelbase: Series I - 86 in (2,200 mm) Series II & Elite - 92 in (2,300 mm)
- Length: Series I - 151.75 in (3,854 mm) Series II & Elite - 161 in (4,100 mm)
- Width: 61 in (1,500 mm)
- Curb weight: Series 1 - 904 kg (1,993 lb) Series II & Elite - 956 kg (2,108 lb)

Chronology
- Successor: Morris 1100

The Morris Major and Austin Lancer are passenger car models that were produced by BMC Australia between 1958 and 1964.

== Series I (1958–1959) ==
The Morris Major and Austin Lancer were introduced in March 1958, designated DO1101 and developed from the contemporary Wolseley 1500 and Riley One-Point-Five models then on sale in the United Kingdom. The Major and Lancer, along with the Wolseley 1500 were produced at BMC Australia's Victoria Park plant at Zetland in Sydney, Australia and were unique to that country, containing up to 98% local content. Australian produced Wolseley 1500s were also given the DO1101 model code.

The Morris Major/Austin Lancer/Wolseley 1500/Riley One-Point-Five all shared the same core design which had originally been developed as a possible replacement for the ever-popular Morris Minor by BMC's in-house design team at Longbridge, England. That plan was abandoned due to the Minor's unwavering appeal with the buying public and a Wolseley version was instead unveiled in 1957, followed by the Riley.

DO1101 was a lightweight, close coupled saloon incorporating the front torsion bar/rear leaf spring suspension, floor pan and accurate rack and pinion steering from the Morris Minor. All models in this series were powered by the famous B series power unit (I4,) of 1489 cc, mated to an MG Magnette type 4-speed manual transmission with floor mounted selector. Front seats were of traditional bucket type. Austin Lancer instruments (oil/fuel/temp/speed/odo) were housed in a nacelle placed in the orthodox position before the driver, whereas Morris instruments were framed in a central position. Electric windscreen wipers are integral with the 12 volt Lucas DC system. Large, heavy duty drum brakes were common specification - by Lockheed for the Wolseley, Morris and Austin and Girling for the Riley. This formula resulted in a popular small-to-medium family car with lively performance, robust build and road manners that were markedly above average for the time.

The Major and Lancer, as distinct from the sportier and more luxurious Wolseley/Riley cars, shared a similar level of appointment, finish and engine tune with contemporary Morris and Austin models. Although comparatively modest, the Major/Lancer was quite a modern car with a generally high level of comfort, quality and value. The sporting potential of the Major/Lancer was recognised immediately and specially prepared cars were raced into the early 1960s.

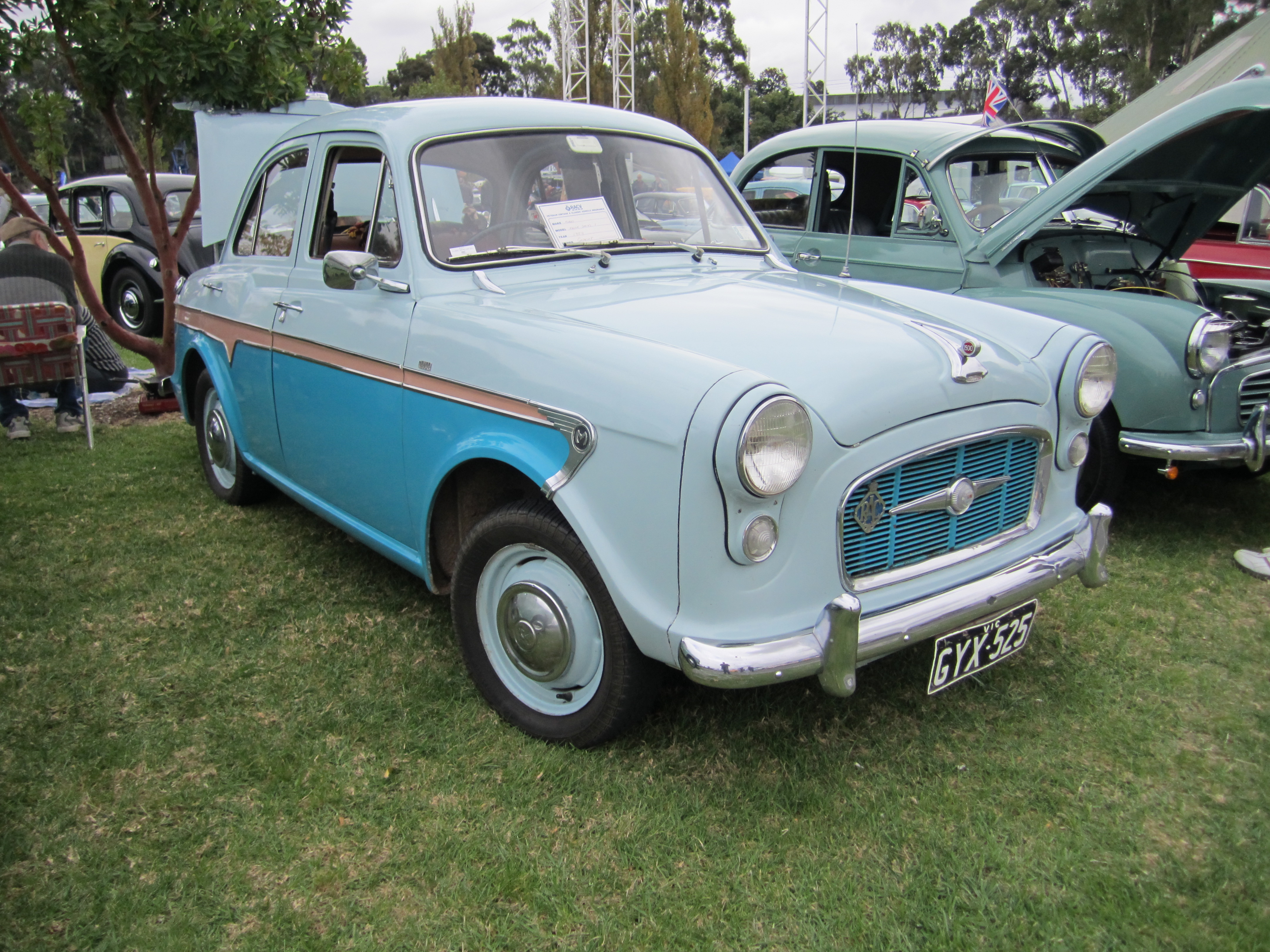
Morris Major Series I

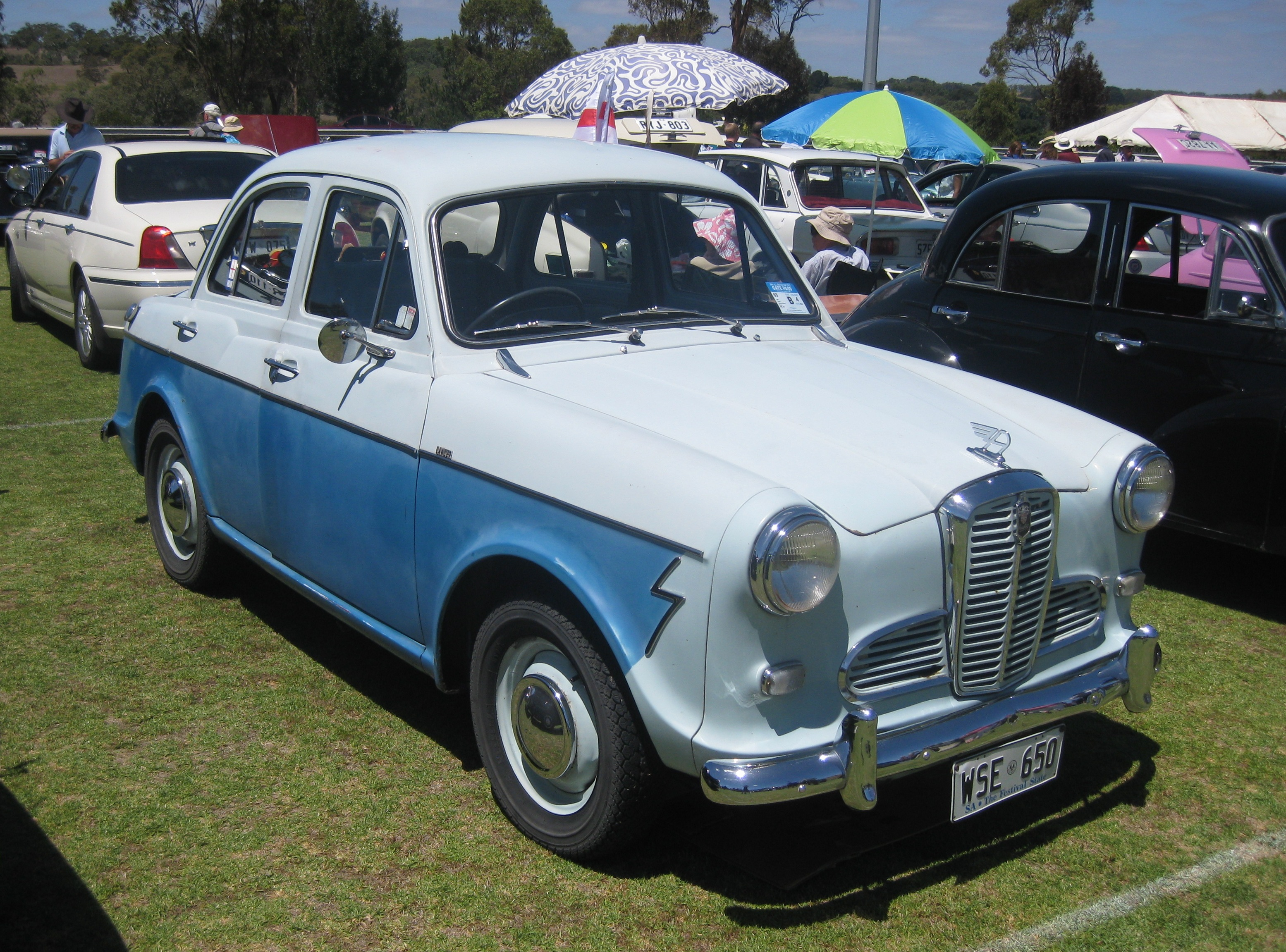
Austin Lancer Series I

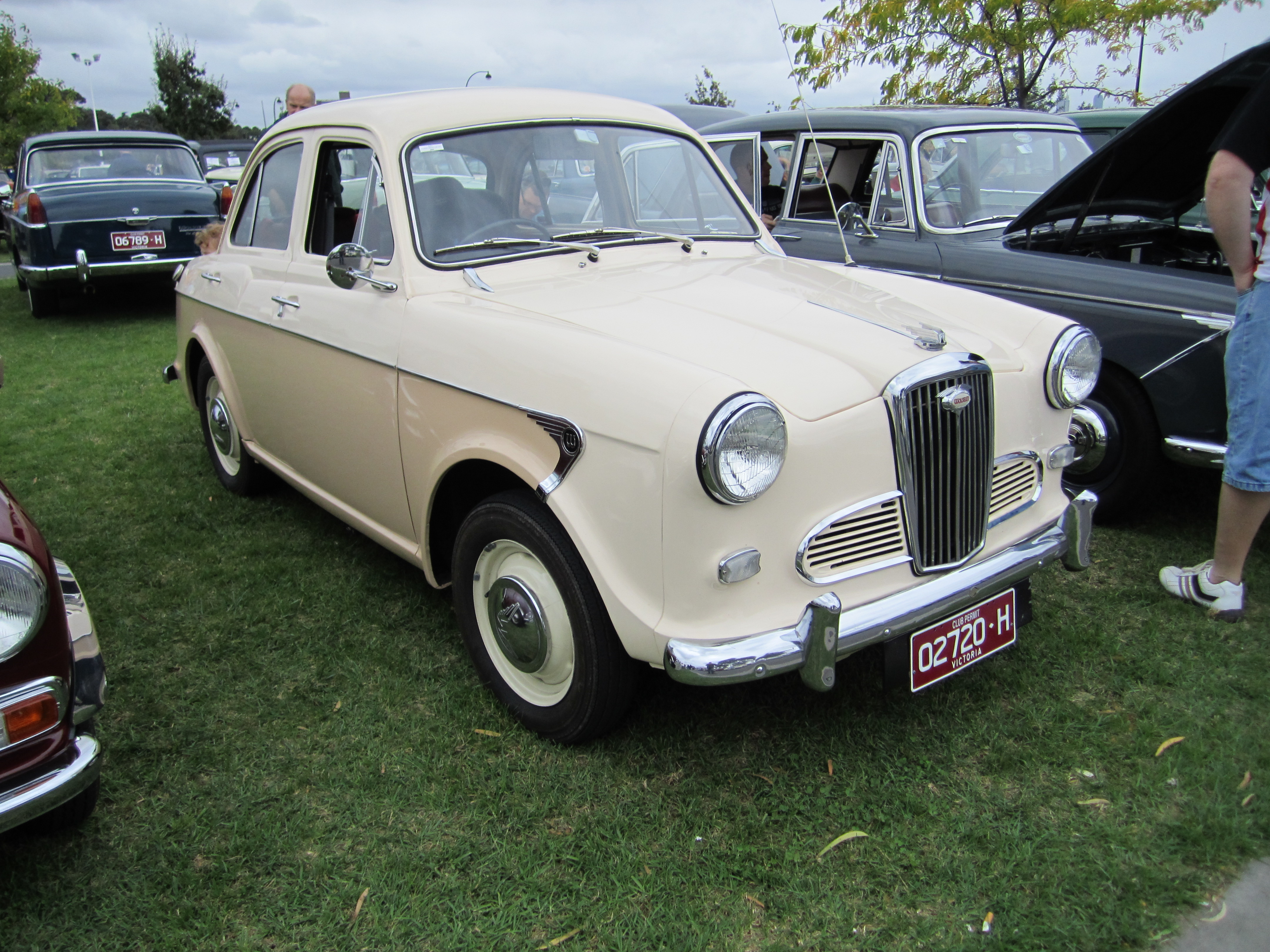
Wolseley 1500

== Series II (1959–1962) ==
The Morris Major and Austin Lancer Series II models, designated DO1115, were released in July 1959. The Series I Morris Major / Austin Lancer had sold reasonably well and was profitable to build due to greatly offset tooling costs and extensive use of shared components. However, BMC Australia quickly invested in the thoroughly re-engineered and subsequently better received Series II. Thenceforth, the Australian cars became quite distinctive from their siblings.

Outwardly, the cars were now longer by 9 inches (229 mm), including an extended wheelbase, tailfins and new front sheet metal. Series II's styling seems to have been more inspired by American ideas and, to many eyes, this gave the cars a more handsome appearance. Several updates to the original design were introduced, many of these changes intended to make the cars more suitable for the tough Australian driving conditions, and to bolster its competitiveness with top selling rivals such as Holden and Volkswagen. The suspension was strengthened and extra reinforcement of the chassis was added. DO1115 interiors adopted a more supportive new front bench seat, cranked gear selector, dished twin spoke steering wheel, ventilation system (heater optional), and two round instrument clusters housed in a hooded nacelle now located conventionally and common to both models. Series II's engine retained its single SU HS2 carburettor with oil bath air filter / SU electric fuel pump and received a modified oil sump to afford greater ground clearance. Early Series I rear axle units had acquired an unfortunate reputation for major failure in service - for Series II the axle and differential were duly modified, however, the experience had proven rather costly in terms of brand image.

The Series II received highly favourable reviews from the motoring press of the time, with its sweeping array of detail improvements, its enhanced handling characteristics and attractive pricing (£997/10s - inflation adjusted to 2015: $29,127.00 AUD) earning much praise.

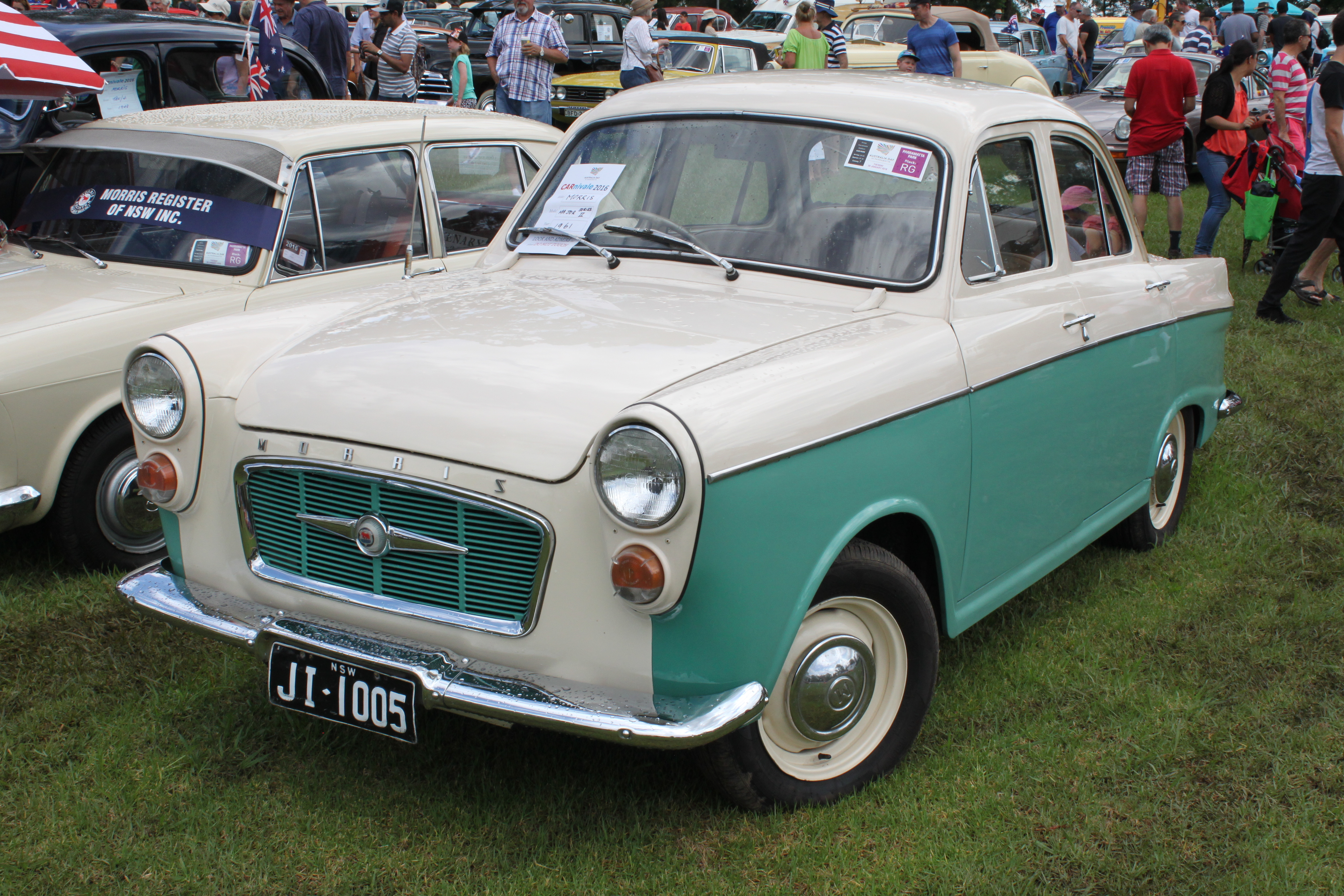
Morris Major Series II

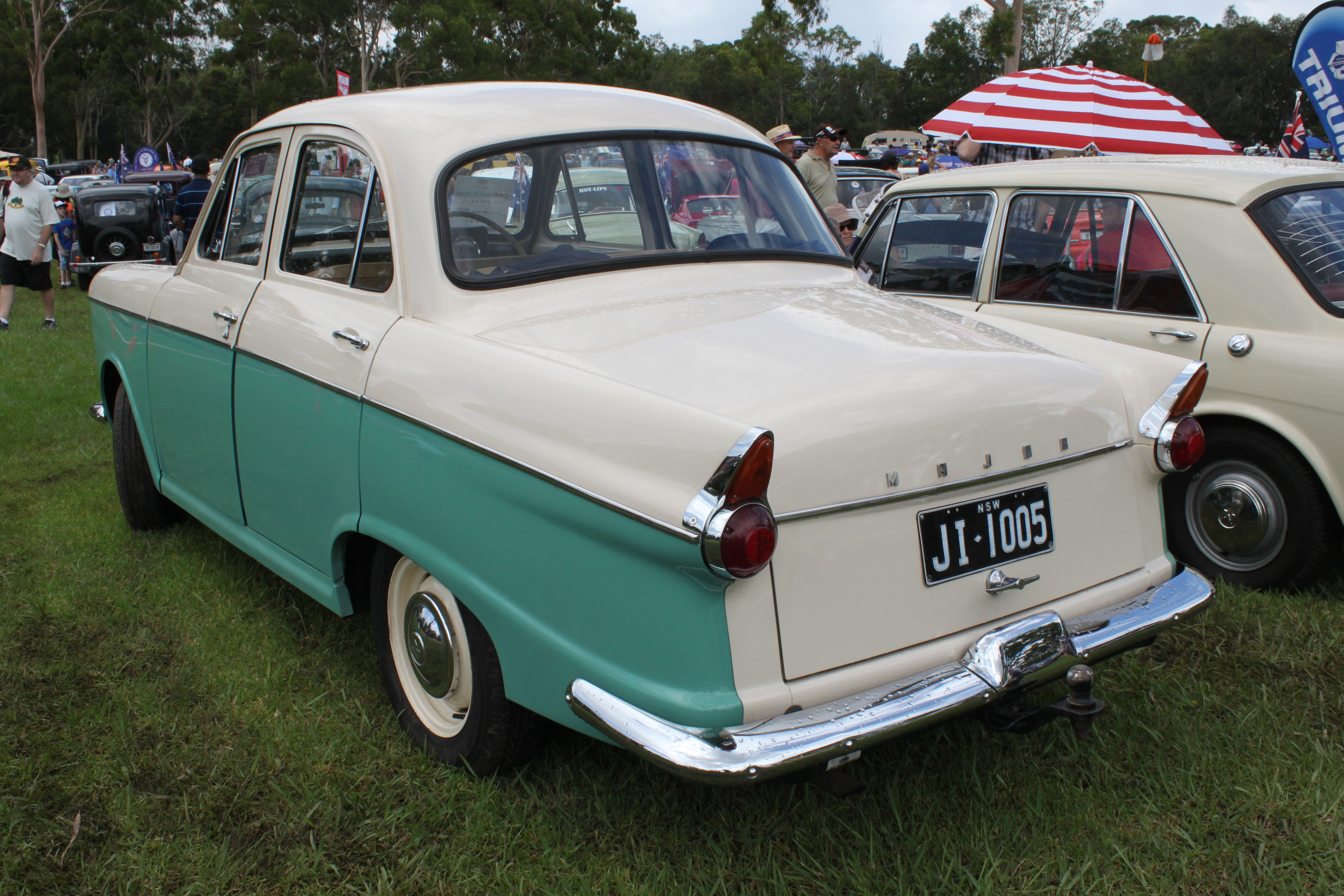
Morris Major Series II

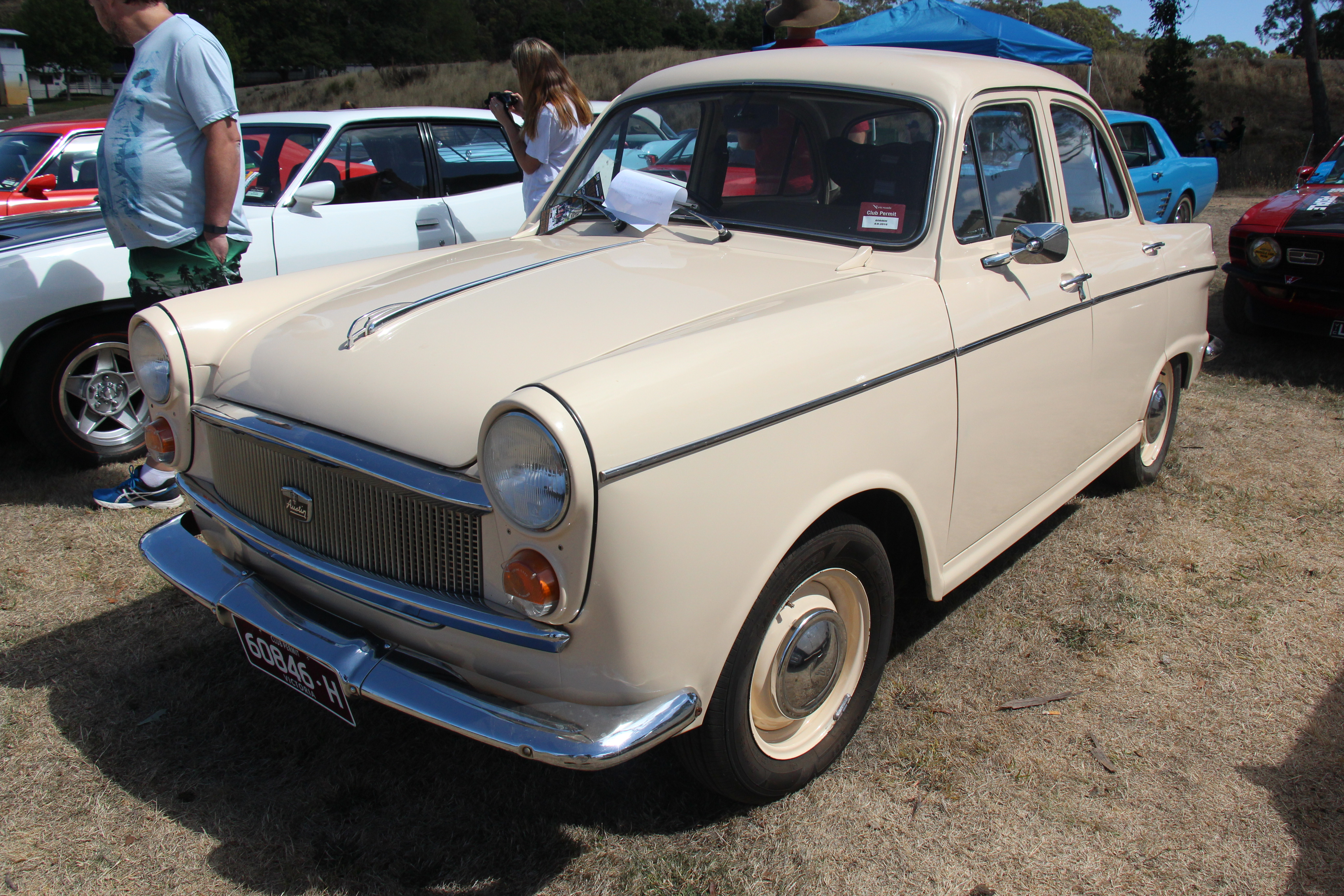
Austin Lancer Series II

== Morris Major Elite (1962–1964) ==
The Morris Major Elite, designated YDO1, was introduced in March 1962. It replaced the Series II models, supplanting the Austin Lancer range completely due to the recent rationalisation of BMC Australia's dealer network: there were now "BMC Centres" only rather than separate outlets for each BMC marque. It was ultimately seen as unnecessary to distribute two versions of the same vehicle, though a "Series III Lancer" had been considered right up to the Elite's introduction. A 'new' Lancer equipped similarly to the forthcoming Elite was detailed in a motoring article by Trevor Davis writing in The Age as late as February 20, 1962, but this was probably only a short 'run-out' series.

The Elite was powered by the enlarged 1622 cc engine with greater performance, this version employing a Zenith VN type carburettor with a dry element air filter and Goss mechanical fuel pump. Telescopic rear shock absorbers, stronger fine spline axle shafts, seat belt mounting points and uprated front suspension rubbers featured among other technical revisions. A visually striking facelift was achieved with only minimal changes to sheet metal; this constituted bright window surrounds, a new full width radiator grille closely resembling that of the Mk VI Morris Oxford, and a "rocket" colour flash on the tailfins. Timely updates to basic equipment level included a fresh air heater/demister, duo-tone paint in various new plain and pastel colours, brighter interiors with redesigned seating (all foam front bench / reshaped rear seat) and a windscreen washer.

The retail price was also lowered from the previous Series II listing (to £940/0/0 - or, approximately $25,952.44 AUD when adjusted for inflation in 2015), making this already highly competitive Major an outstanding value package in the somewhat volatile auto market of 1962. Marketed under the tagline "Truly Australian", the perky "Morris Elite" held an impressive share of total BMC Australia sales at the time, and warranty claims were the least for any of their models then to date. YDO1 production ceased by February 1964 when the model was replaced by the Morris 1100

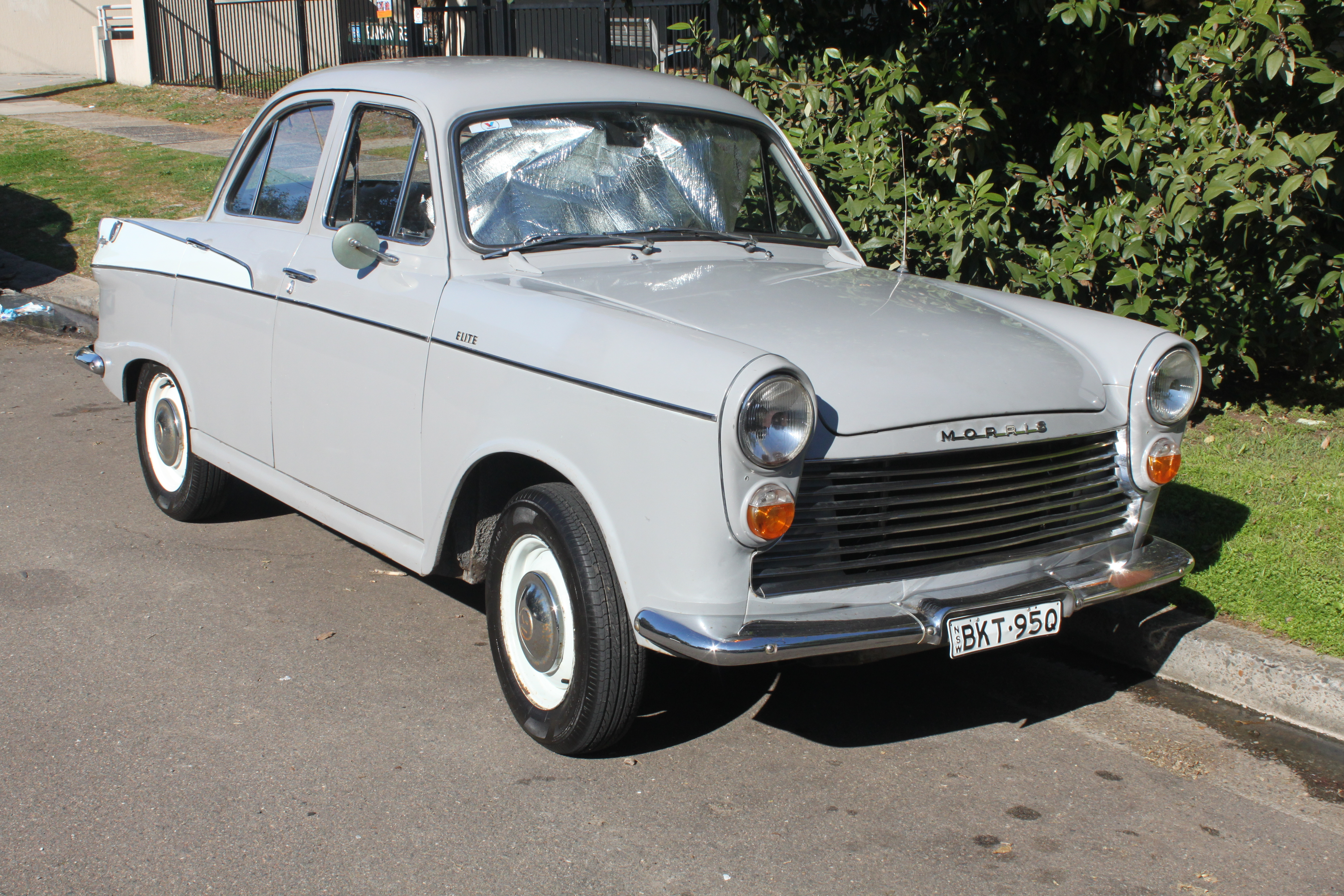
Morris Major Elite

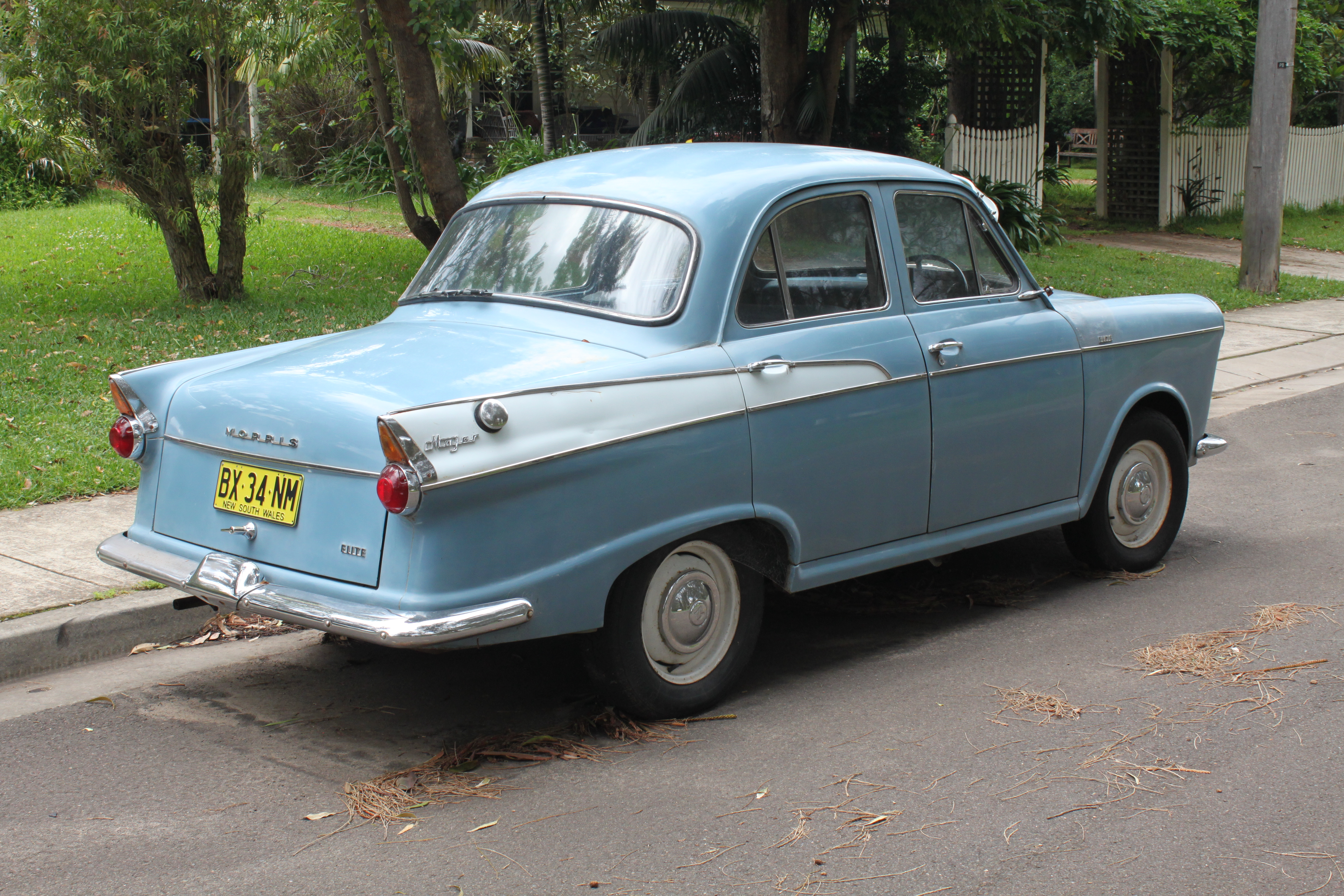
Morris Major Elite
