= The Motor =

British weekly car magazine, 1903–1988

Motor
- 16 May 1981 cover
- Frequency: Weekly
- Founder: Temple Press
- First issue: 28 January 1903
- Final issue: 1988
- Country: United Kingdom

The Motor (later, just Motor) was a British weekly car magazine founded on 28 January 1903 and published by Temple Press. It was initially launched as Motorcycling and Motoring in 1902 before the title was shortened. From the 14 March 1964 issue the magazine name was simply Motor. Compared to rival The Autocar (later, just Autocar), Motor was more informative and more conservative.

The magazine usually included:

- News and scoops of the latest cars
- Motorsport news and results
- Car reviews – normally two, both 2 pages long with specifications and impressions.
- Road tests – one per week and very detailed

In 1988, the journal was absorbed by its long-standing rival Autocar, which became, from the 7 September issue, Autocar & Motor. Six years later, with the 21 September 1994 issue, the name reverted to Autocar.
