= Mulliner =

Mulliner may refer to:

== People ==
- Stephen Mulliner, croquet world champion
- Thomas Mulliner (around 1545–1570), Oxford organist who compiled the commonplace Mulliner Book
- The Mulliner family (18th cen. onwards), British coachbuilders from c. 1760 to c. 1908:
  - Francis Mulliner (1765–1819) of Mulliner Northampton
    - Francis Mulliner (1789–1841) of Mulliner Northampton, including Leamington Priors
      - Francis Mulliner (1824–1886) Mulliner Northampton, Mulliner Liverpool
        - Augustus Greville Mulliner (1861–1905) of Mulliner Liverpool, including A. G. Mulliner Body Co. and Accrington
      - Henry Mulliner (1827–1887) of Mulliner Leamington at Leamington Priors
        - Arthur Felton Mulliner (1859–1946) of Arthur Mulliner
        - Herbert Hall Mulliner (1861–1924) of Mulliners (Birmingham)
      - Robert Bouverie Mulliner (1830–1902) of Mulliner Chiswick
        - Henry Jervis Mulliner (1870–1967) of H. J. Mulliner
      - William Rice Mulliner (1834–1863), army officer

== Fiction ==
- Mr Mulliner, character from the short stories of P. G. Wodehouse, who frequents the Angler's Rest public house where he entertains the others with stories about his remarkably numerous and far-flung Mulliner relatives.
- Archibald Mulliner, character from the short stories of P. G. Wodehouse
- Rev. Augustine Mulliner, character from the short stories of P. G. Wodehouse

== Companies ==
Several coachbuilding businesses led by individuals from the Mulliner family (see above):

- Mulliner Northampton, including Leamington Priors (c. 1760–1940)
- Mulliner London (1882–1940)
  - Arthur Mulliner (1910?–1940)
- Mulliner Liverpool, including A. G. Mulliner Body Co. and Accrington (1854–?)
- Mulliner Chiswick (1870–1991)
  - H. J. Mulliner & Co. (1897–1991)
    - Mulliner Park Ward (1961–1991)
- Mulliners (Birmingham) (c. 1888–1960)
