= Autovia =

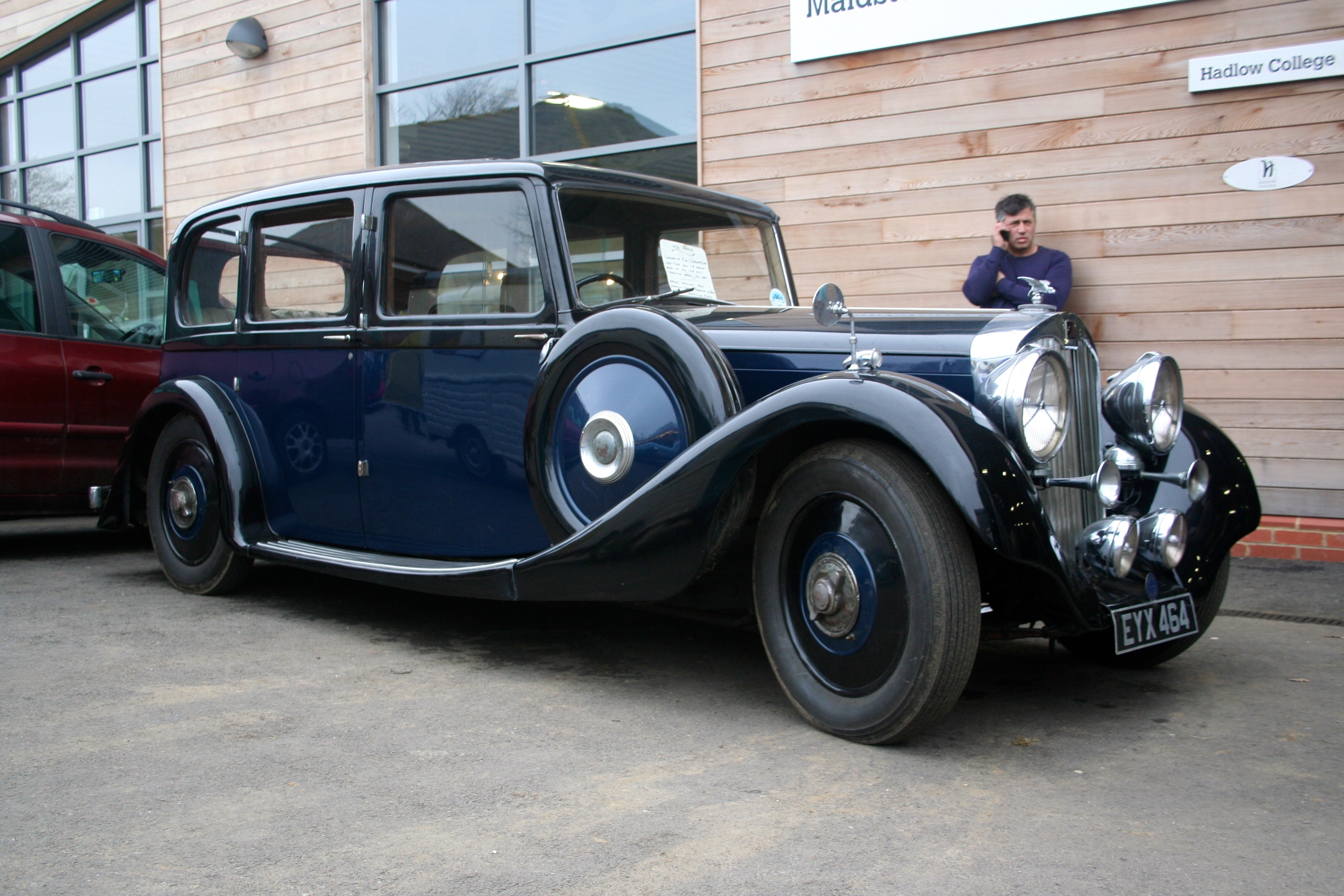
- limousine by Arthur Mulliner; EYX 464 registered September 1938

Overview
- Manufacturer: Autovia Cars Limited, (Note: Autovia Cars —Manufacturers of and dealers in and hirers of automobiles, motor vans, and lorries, &c. Nominal capital, £60,000, in £1 shares. "Company Registrations". The Times. No. 47249. 17 December 1935. p. 21.); Ordnance Works, Midland Road, Foleshill, Coventry CV6 5DX
- Production: 1937-1938, public sales starting 1936; 44 made
- Designer: Charles van Eugen

Body and chassis
- Class: Large luxury
- Body style: chassis 4-light sports saloon 6-light saloon limousine
- Layout: Front engine, rear-wheel drive
- Related: (engine) Riley 1½-litre I4; Riley 8/90 2¼-litre V8

Powertrain
- Engine: 2,849 cc (174 cu in) V8
- Transmission: single dry-plate clutch to a 4-speed manual gearbox with synchromesh on all speeds or automatic clutch and 4-speed preselective gearbox divided propeller shaft, back section in a torque tube final drive by underhung worm is housed in a banjo-type casing

Dimensions
- Wheelbase: 129 in (3,277 mm); Track 56.5 in (1,435 mm)
- Length: 175.5 in (4,458 mm); 183 in (4,648 mm)
- Width: 71 in (1,803 mm)

Chronology
- Predecessor: none
- Successor: none

Overview
- Production: 44

Layout
- Configuration: 90° V8
- Displacement: 2,849 cubic centimetres (174 cu in)
- Cylinder bore: 69.5 mm (2.74 in)
- Piston stroke: 95.25 mm (3.750 in)
- Valvetrain: inclined at 90° overhead valves worked by pushrods from three camshafts

Combustion
- Fuel system: twin Zenith downdraught carburettors with a balance pipe and hot-spot fed from a 16 gallon tank at the back, ignition by magneto with automatic advance mounted vertically towards the rear of the V
- Cooling system: a water pump is mounted either side of the timing case. The radiator has a fan and thermostatically controlled shutters. The sump is ribbed at the sides

Output
- Power output: 99 bhp @ 4,700 rpm Tax rating 23.8hp

Chronology
- Predecessor: Riley 8/90 2¼-litre 90°V8
- Successor: none

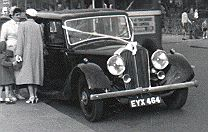
EYX 464 around 1963 No higher resolution available

Autovia was a short lived brand of British cars from Coventry existing from 1935 to 1938 with production starting in January 1937. Created by Riley to target the luxury market, the venture was ambitious and even included setting up a school for chauffeurs. The cars were expensive, however, and it was a market sector already well served by other companies. 44 cars were made.

== Large luxury cars ==
The company was created by Riley as a subsidiary to produce large luxury cars and a new factory was built. A 2849 cc 90-degree V-8, triple camshaft engine was developed from the Riley 8/90 engine but using the same bore as the 1½-litre Riley engine. This was coupled to a preselector unit bought from Armstrong Siddeley. One car was fitted with a ZF 4-speed manual box. Drive was to the rear wheels through a live axle with worm gear final drive.

Three body types were advertised, a Sports saloon, a Special Saloon with extra leg room at the expense of boot space and a limousine mostly built by Arthur Mulliner of Northampton who were London distributors. The car was also available as a bare chassis.

The venture failed when Riley went bankrupt. When they were taken over by the Nuffield Organization Autovia was not resurrected and the assets were purchased by Jimmy James Ltd., a Riley distributor in London.

There were thought to be eight of these cars remaining in 2008.

The limousine was considered remarkable for its width being more than its overall height yet the floors were flat and a tunnel and wells avoided at the back. "The general low set helps stability" said The Times, "the models are well equipped, as they should be for the price".

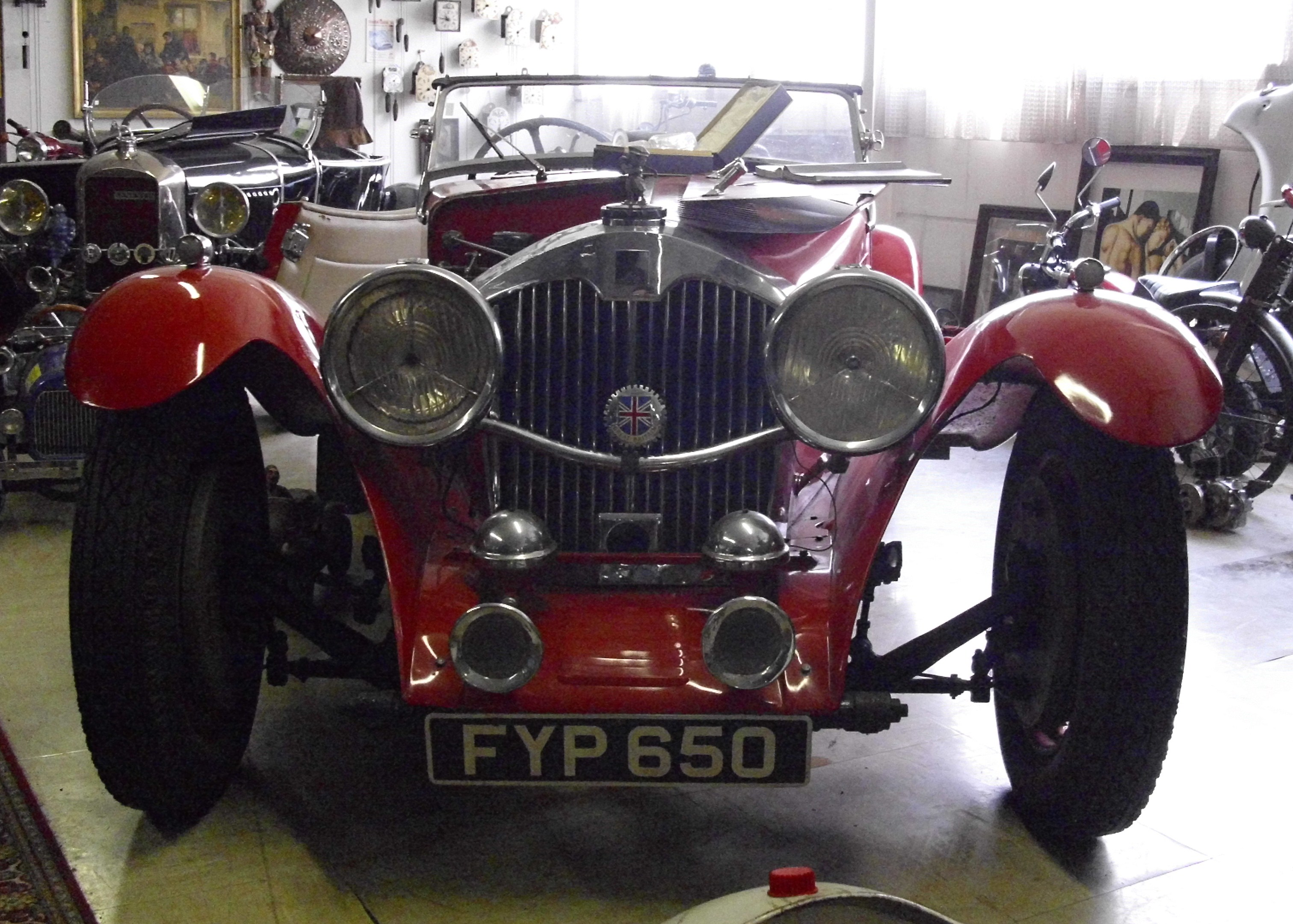
Open two-seater, originally a saloon, first registered September 1939

== Specification ==
The underslung chassis frame permitted a low overall height and low floor line, for the saloon and limousine as well as the sporting model.

In addition to the details in the adjacent box:

- wheels: Dunlop centre-lock wire 3.50" x 19" with nave plates
- tyres: 5.5" section on 19 inch wheels
- suspension by semi-elliptic springs from the two rigid axles is controlled by hydraulic shock absorbers, their resistance is controlled by the driver
- braking on all four wheels is mechanically actuated by rods with wedge operated shoes in 16 inch drums
- steering by worm and nut
- lubrication (of chassis items) is centralised and automatic

== Pricing ==
In a prior announcement 10 October 1936 Victor Riley revealed there would be two models available in addition to the bare chassis all with an automatic clutch, a preselective gearbox and a worm driven back axle. Prices would be:

- chassis £685
- five-seat saloon £975
- limousine £995

The London distributors were Arthur Mulliner Limited of 54 Baker Street.

== See also ==
- List of car manufacturers of the United Kingdom
