= H. J. Mulliner & Co. =

British coachbuilder

- Company type: Subsidiary
- Industry: Automotive
- Founded: 1897; 129 years ago, in Northampton, England, United Kingdom
- Defunct: 1961
- Fate: 1959 (acquired by Rolls-Royce); 1961 (merged with Park Ward to form Mulliner Park Ward)
- Successor: Mulliner Park Ward
- Area served: Worldwide
- Products: Luxury automobiles
- Services: Coachbuilding, Automotive design

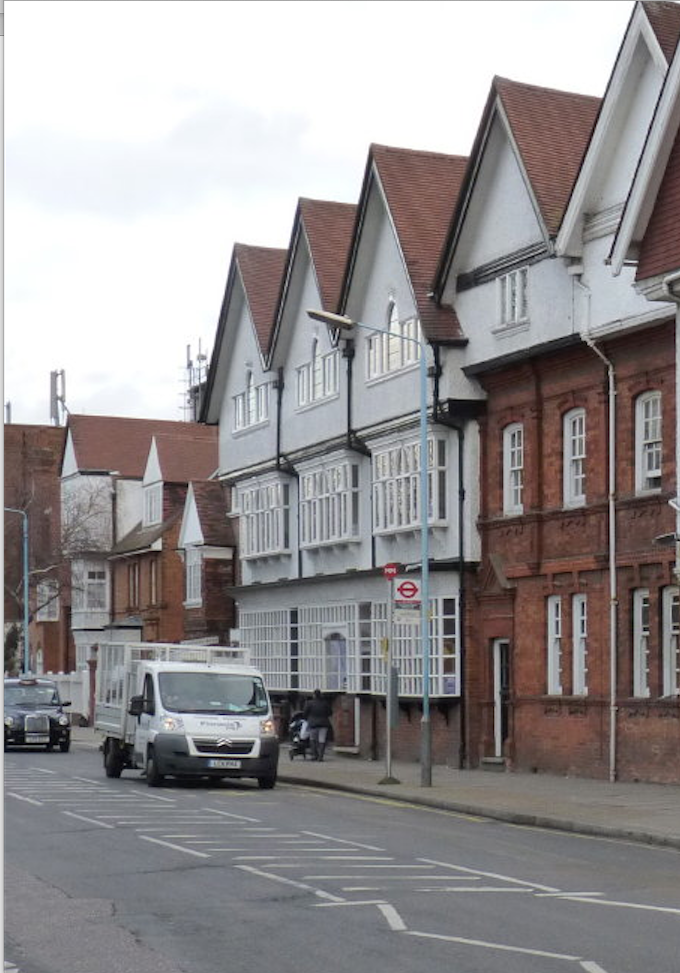
The H J Mulliner showroom on the corner of Bath Road and Flanders Road, Bedford Park, Chiswick. Vehicular access to showroom and works is from Flanders Road. The customer's pedestrian entrance on Bath Road is to the right of the pedestrian by the Citroen truck

H. J. Mulliner & Co. was a well-known British coachbuilder operating from Bedford Park, Chiswick, West London. The company which owned it was formed by H J Mulliner in 1897 but the business was a continuing branch of a family business founded in Northampton in the 1760s to hire out carriages. In December 1909 the controlling interest in this company passed to John Croall & Sons of Edinburgh. Croall sold that interest to Rolls-Royce in 1959.

"Mulliner" is now the personal commissioning department for Bentley.

== Henry Jervis Mulliner ==
Henry Jervis Mulliner (1870–1967), born in Liverpool but raised in Chiswick, was the second son of Robert Bouverie Mulliner (1830–1902) from Northampton, third son of Francis Mulliner (1789–1841) of Leamington Spa and Northampton. Robert Bouverie Mulliner had first established a thriving coachbuilding business in Liverpool in the mid-1850s then sold that to his brother and in the early 1870s started another in Chiswick on the outskirts of London.

His son H. J. Mulliner incorporated his own company in 1897 while with Mulliner London Limited. (Note: In 1882 A G Mulliner of Liverpool, whose father had opened it a decade earlier, and A F Mulliner of Northampton placed the ownership of the showroom at 28 Brook Street, London W1 in a jointly held company, Mulliner London Limited (HJM to GAOliver)) He found a special interest in the automobile side of that business and expanded in 1900 by buying from Mulliner London Limited the Mulliner showroom in Brook Street, Mayfair, London. The location was more convenient for his clients than Chiswick. One of the early clients was C.S. Rolls who had a body built on a Rolls-Royce Silver Ghost for his own use.

== John Croall & Sons Edinburgh ==
In 1906 the London works were moved from Mayfair to Chiswick and in December 1909 H J Mulliner sold a controlling interest in the company to John Croall & Sons of Edinburgh. A family connection was maintained as Croall employed H J Mulliner's wife's brother, Frank Piesse (1885–1960), to run the company.

Although bodies were fitted to other chassis, by the 1930s virtually the entire output was being fitted to Rolls-Royce and Bentleys.

== Rolls-Royce ==
Rolls-Royce acquired Mulliner in July 1959 and merged it with Park Ward which they had owned since 1939 forming Mulliner Park Ward in 1961. A financial columnist noted that the (cash) outlay for Rolls-Royce was relatively small as the net assets of John Croall were around £250,000. It was noted that Mulliner was one of the last independent coach builders, others being controlled by motor manufacturers or distributors.

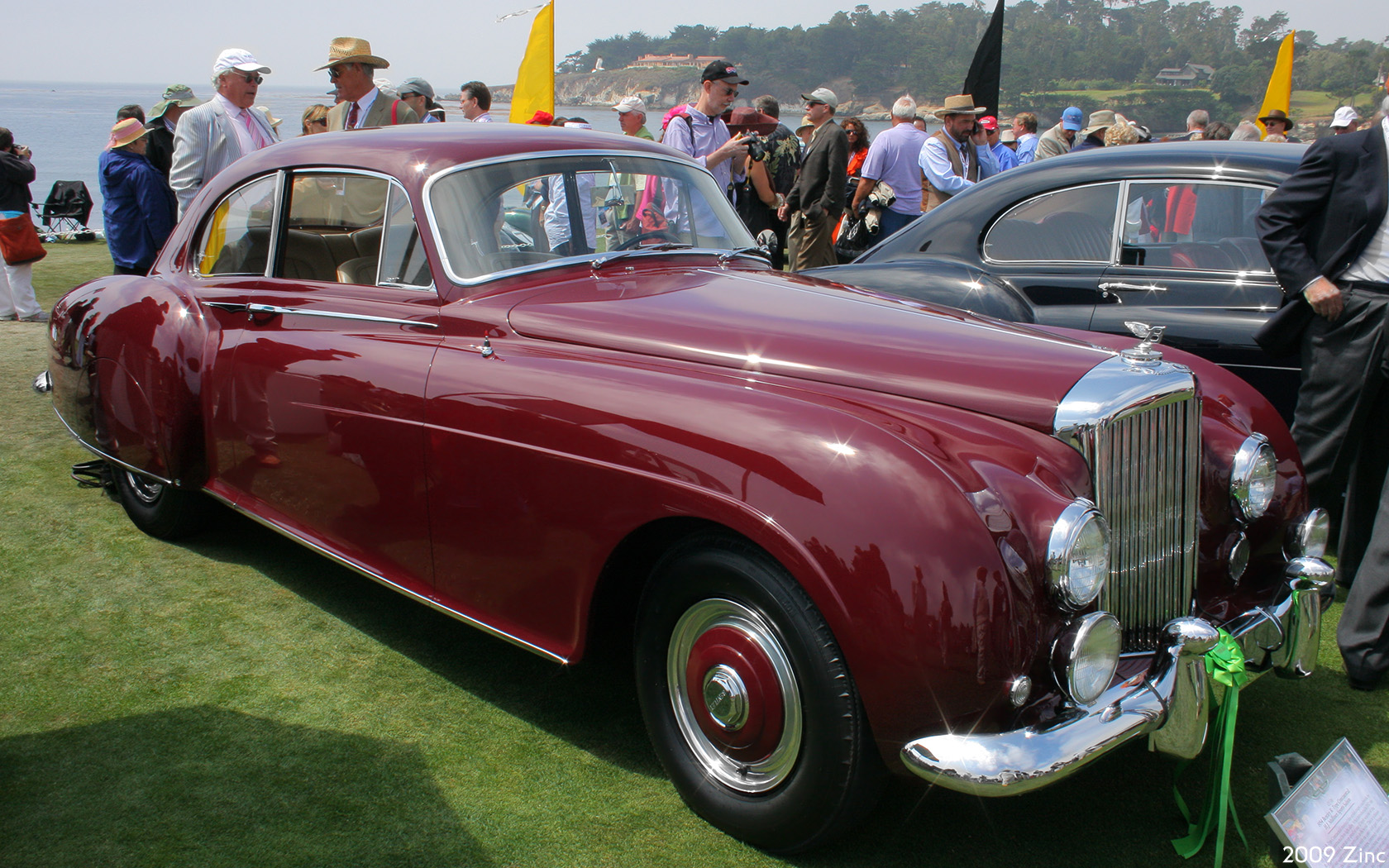
2-dr lightweight sports saloon 1954
on a Bentley Continental chassis

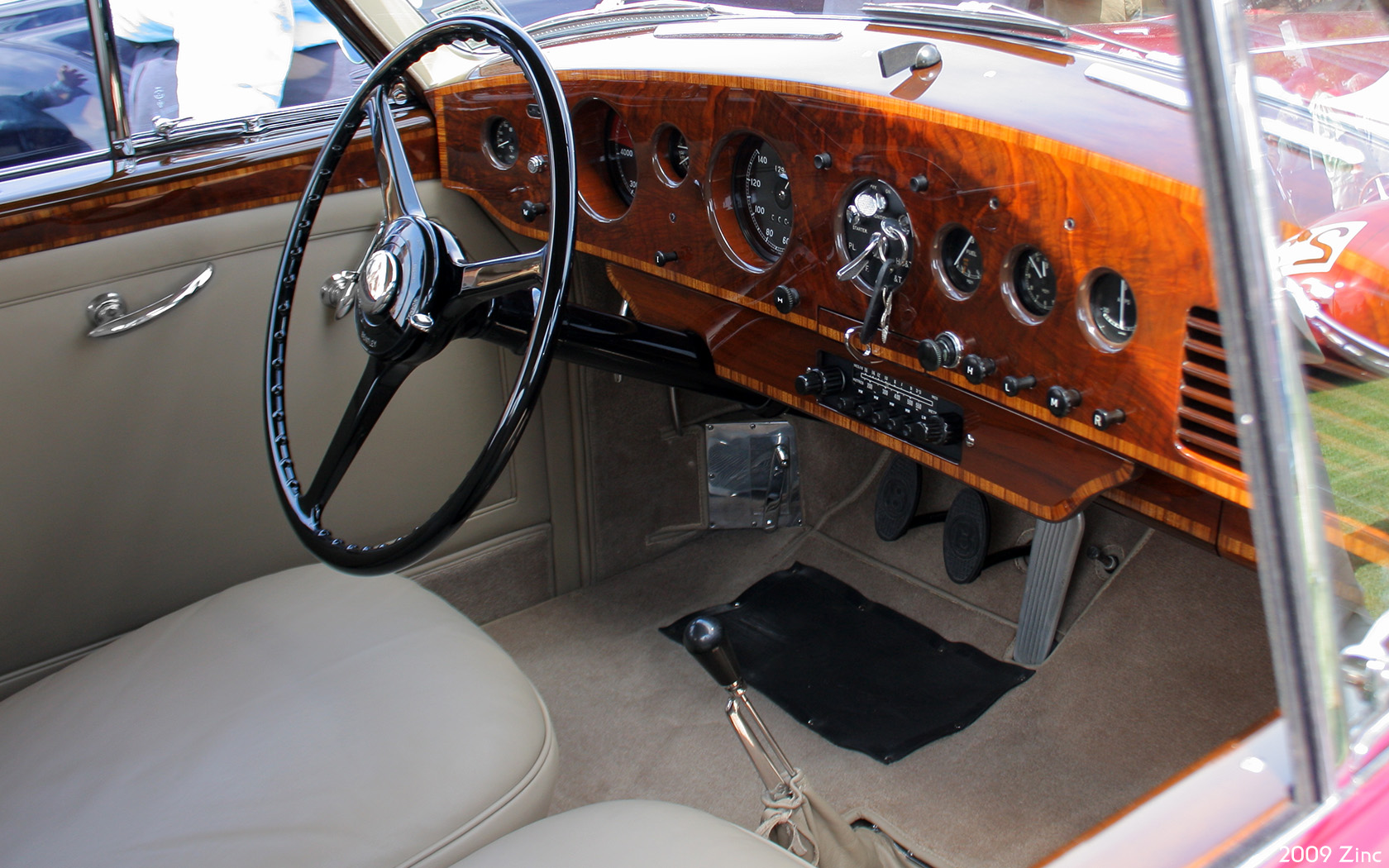
interior of the same Bentley

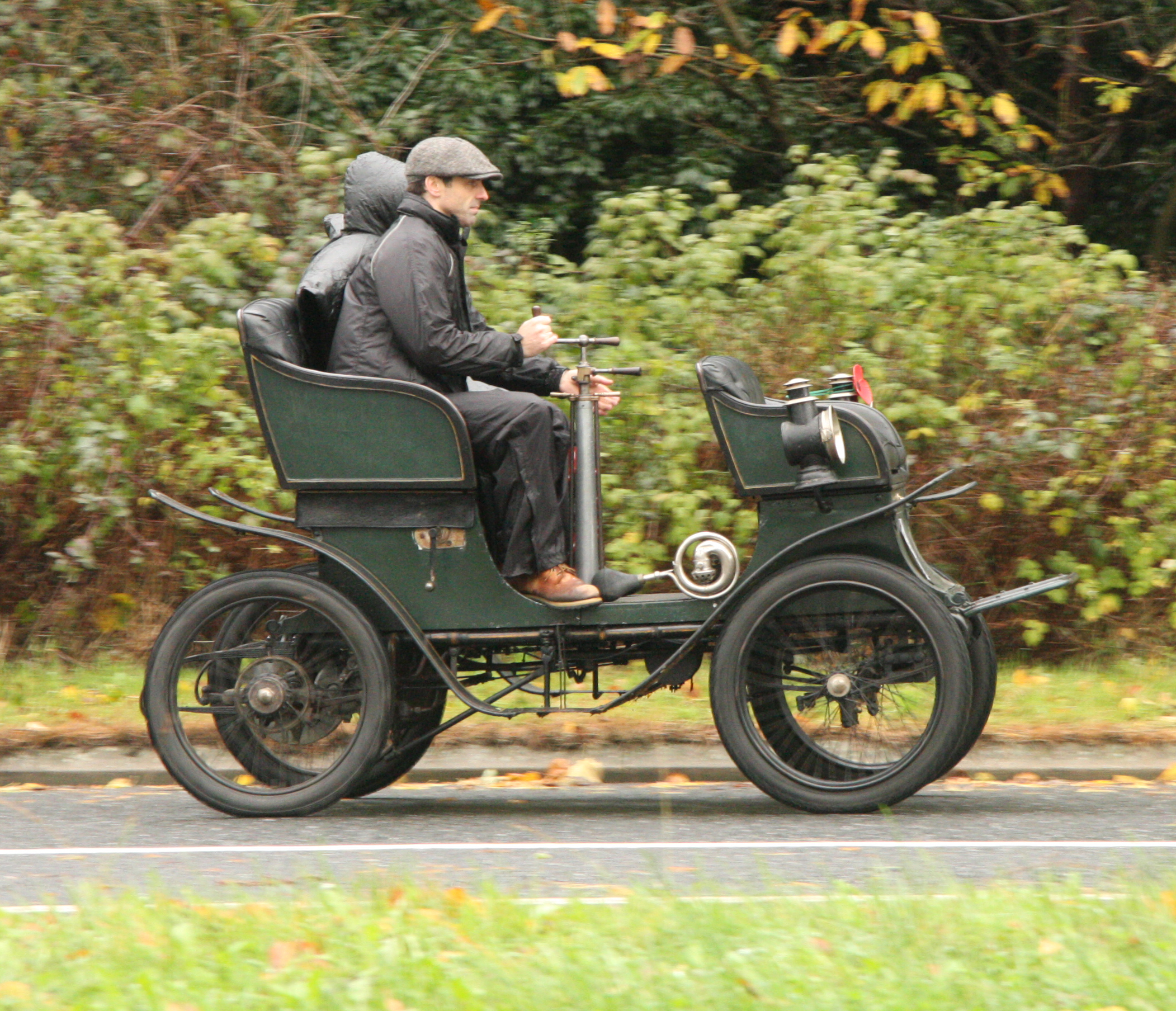
Double phaeton body 1900
on a 3 1/2hp De Dion-Bouton chassis

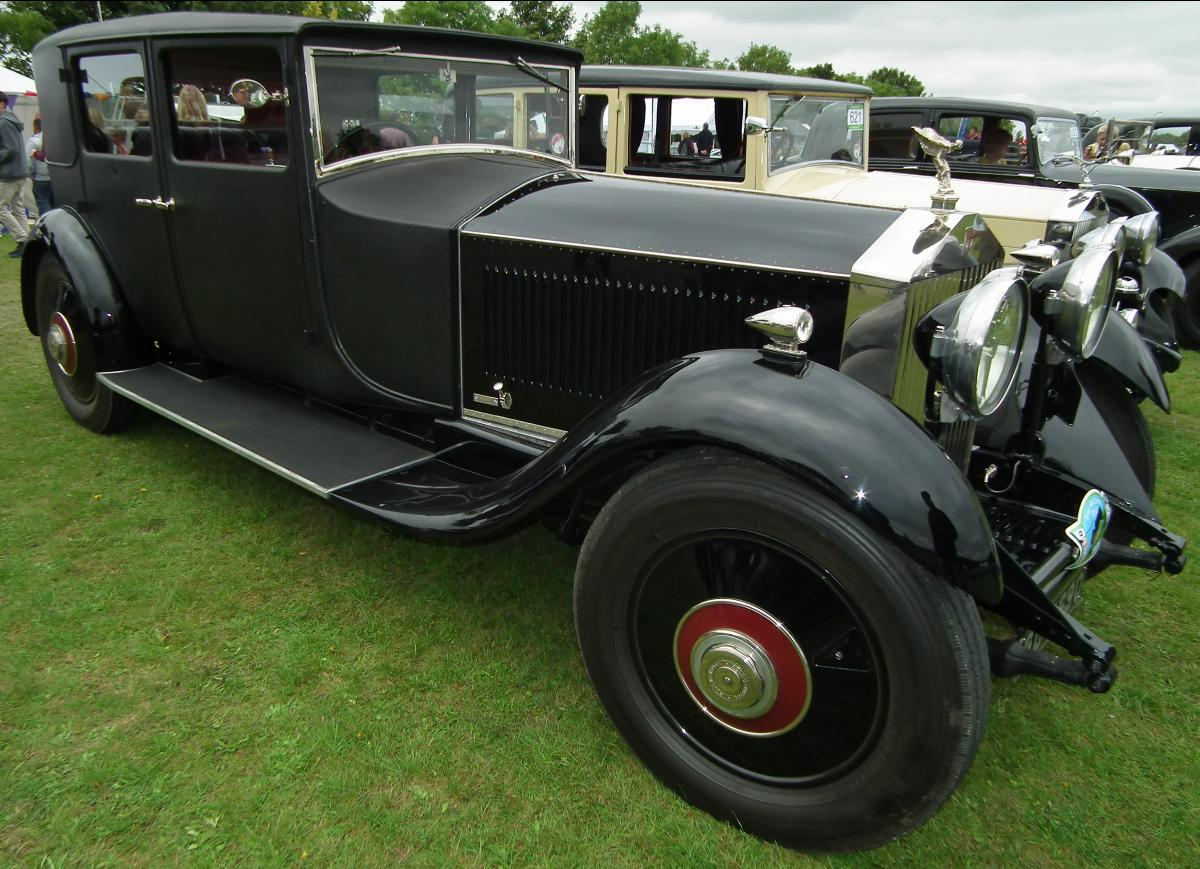
4-door 4-light lightweight Weymann construction sports saloon 1929
on a Rolls-Royce Phantom II chassis

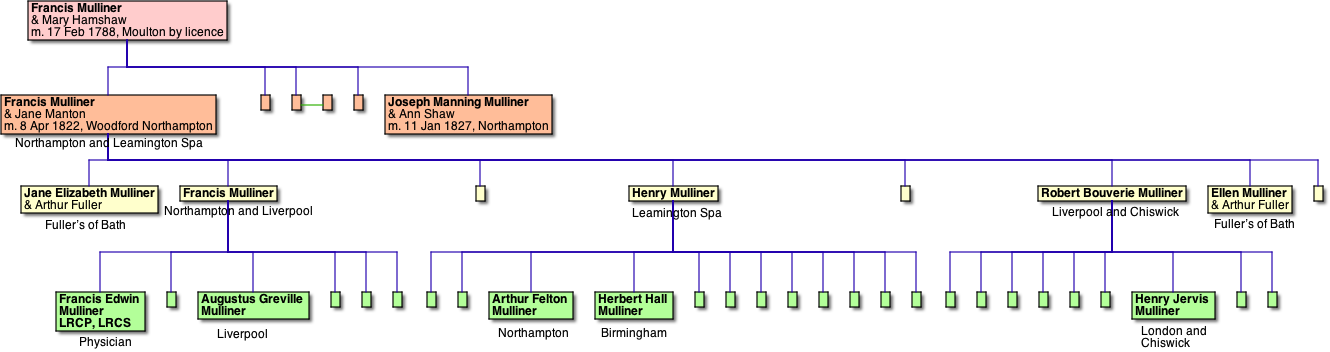
Family tree

== See also ==
- Mulliner Park Ward
- Park Ward
- Mulliners (Birmingham)
- Arthur Mulliner
