= Mulliners (Birmingham) =

British coachbuilding business

Mulliners Limited of Birmingham was a British coachbuilding business in Bordesley Green, with factories in Bordesley Green and Cherrywood Roads. It made standard bodies for specialist car manufacturers. In the 19th century there were family ties with founders Mulliners of Northampton and the businesses of other Mulliner brothers and cousins but it became a quite separate business belonging to Herbert Mulliner.

A Northampton coach building family founded this business in Leamington Spa for the prosperous custom attracted to the newly fashionable spa town early in the 19th century. Direct ownership and control by Mulliner family interests was lost in 1903 when it was sold to Charles Cammell, which then merged into Cammell Laird. H H Mulliner ceased to be a main-board director of Cammell Laird in 1909. Mulliners Limited continued under various ownerships until the end of 1960, when Standard-Triumph International closed it down.

== Herbert Hall Mulliner ==
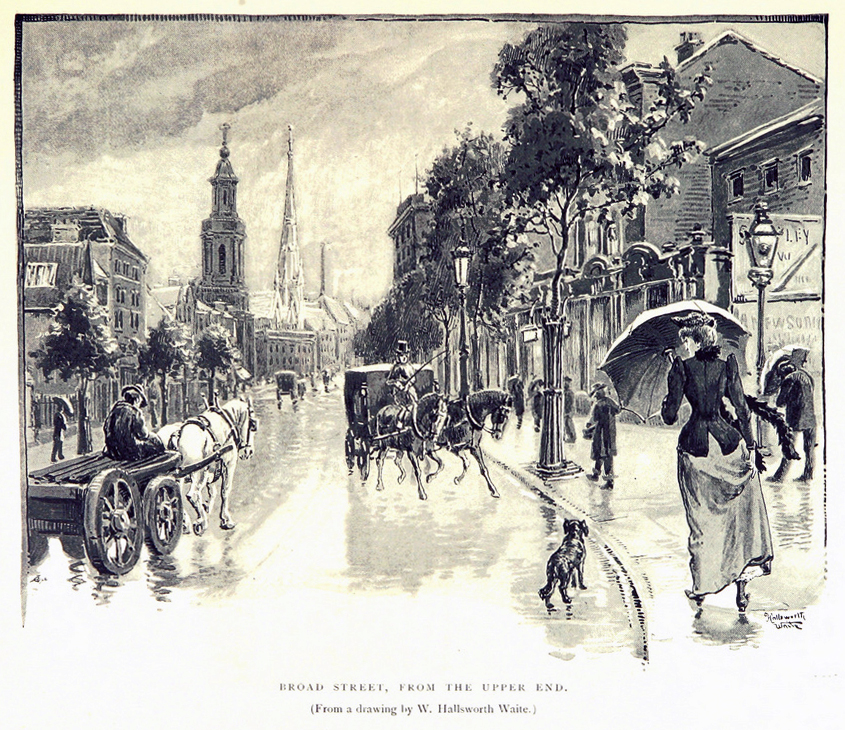
Broad street, Birmingham, 1894

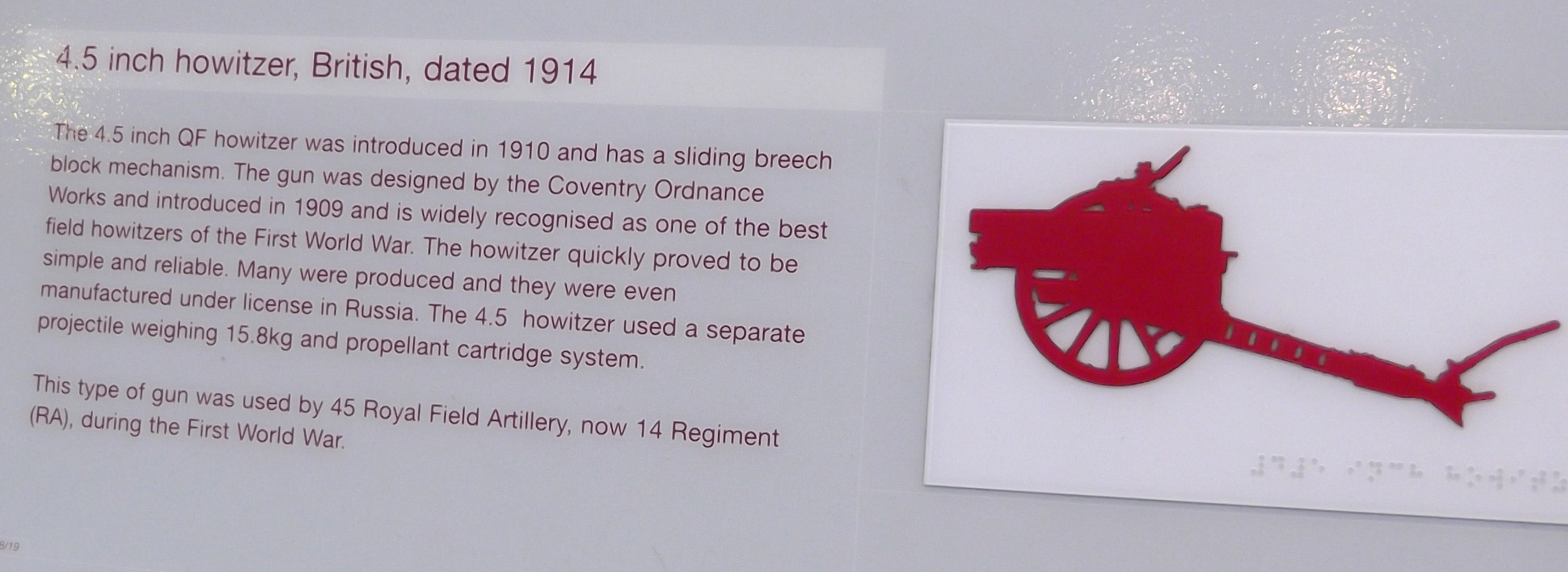
4.5 inch howitzer 1909

Henry Mulliner (1827-1887) of Leamington Spa, second son of Francis Mulliner (1789-1841) of Leamington Spa and Northampton, had six sons and six daughters. Henry published his book Carriage Builder's Tour in America in Leamington in 1883. Henry's Leamington Spa coach building business in Bedford Street and The Parade later had its carriage works in Packington Square and showroom in Chapel Street. Henry's second son Arthur Felton Mulliner (1859-1946) on Henry's death took over the family's Northampton business.

Henry's third son, Herbert Hall Mulliner (1861-1924), in the light of the decline in quality of the Spa's visitors moved in 1885 to Birmingham. (Note: Advertisement, Birmingham Daily Post, Tuesday 24 November 1885 "Carriage Accident Insurance On account of the large number of Street Accidents to Carriages in Birmingham, Mr H H Mulliner has arranged to Insure all kinds of Carriages, Carts, Light Vans etc in this neighbourhood against damages caused by collision, runaway horses, horses falling etc etc. The increasing number of Steam Trams and the extra Cabs there will be with the reduced fares render such insurance most advisable. The rates are very considerably less (from 17s. 6d. per annum) and the advantages much greater than those of any of the London Companies. Prospectus and full particulars on application to H H Mulliner Carriage Manufactory (Late Findlater’s) 300 Broad Street, Birmingham") Following his father's death in November 1887 and consequent rearrangement of family ownership (Note: Leamington Advertisement Leamington Spa Courier Saturday 10 March 1888: "Benison Brothers, Carriage Builders, Leamington, Beg to inform their Customers and Patrons that they have purchased the Works lately occupied by Mulliner & Co Limited in Bedford Street & Portland Road and will be carried on (sic) in connection with their works in Upper Bedford Street. Clarendon Avenue Show Rooms Closed from this date lease having expired." Birmingham Notice of dissolution on 19 February 1889 of the partnership between C Hamilton Wood and Herbert H Mulliner in the business of Carriage and Coach builders at no 300 Broad Street Birmingham. The London Gazette, 26 April 1889, issue 25928 page 2349) he made his home in Rugby and took up other interests including in 1895 the manufacture of scientific instruments. In 1897 he converted the coach and carriage making part of his business to motor vehicle bodies and was then employing 200. Used as well as new carriages were sold from the Mulliner showrooms in Broad Street, Birmingham, and H H Mulliner was the first to offer insurance of his carriages against accidents.

Meanwhile continuing with scientific instruments he began producing in Birmingham with F. Wigley, tools for making the more complicated parts of ordnance and they formed companies: Mulliner Wigley Company Limited formed 1895 and Wigley-Mulliner Engineering Company Limited formed 1897. In April 1899 he married. (Note: He married at Lambeg church on 6 April 1899 Adelaide Letitia daughter of John Richardson of Lambeg House Lisburne co Antrim Ireland.(Marriages, Leamington Spa Courier, Saturday 15 April 1899) They were to have three daughters.) The demands of the South African War led to major developments and the scene of operation was moved to Coventry to a site of some sixty acres. (Note: Messrs Mulliner’s works in Coventry The Coventry Evening Telegraph of Tuesday 25 February 1902 reported that Mulliners had purchased the premises on Stoney Stanton Road built for Mr Hooley’s cycle-tube manufactory where they were erecting new workshops which when complete would cover the area from the canal bank almost to Red Lane. They forecast "Before many months are past 1,000 hands will be employed initially on making gun carriages for the War Office and Admiralty." The railway line was to be extended from the brick works across the highway to the northern end of Mulliner’s works.) All the companies were amalgamated with Charles Cammell & Co. Limited. (Note: Coventry Evening Telegraph Friday 20 February 1903 "Mulliner Wigley & Co, carriage manufacturers etc of Coventry and Birmingham is being acquired by Charles Cammell Limited, iron and steel manufacturers of Sheffield") In 1903 these companies merged into the newly blended armaments and shipbuilding business, Cammell Laird, of Birkenhead and H H Mulliner joined their main board. The ordnance operation became Coventry Ordnance Works and was separated out and jointly owned by Cammell Laird, Fairfield Shipbuilding and Engineering Company of Glasgow and John Brown & Company of Clydebank with Mulliner as managing director, Wigley was responsible for the technical side.

A special article detailed the background of the origins of H H Mulliner's involvement in the ordnance works in a supplement to The Times 9 June 1909. The main workshop at the Coventry Ordnance works was claimed by The Times in 1909 to cover a greater area under its single (110 feet to the apex) roof than any other factory in the country. The travelling cranes were of 110 tons capacity. It was also notable for the arrangement that machines were brought to the work instead of the work to the machines and several machines could work on the same piece at the same time. The cost of the oil alone to fill the well to harden the largest guns approached £5,000.

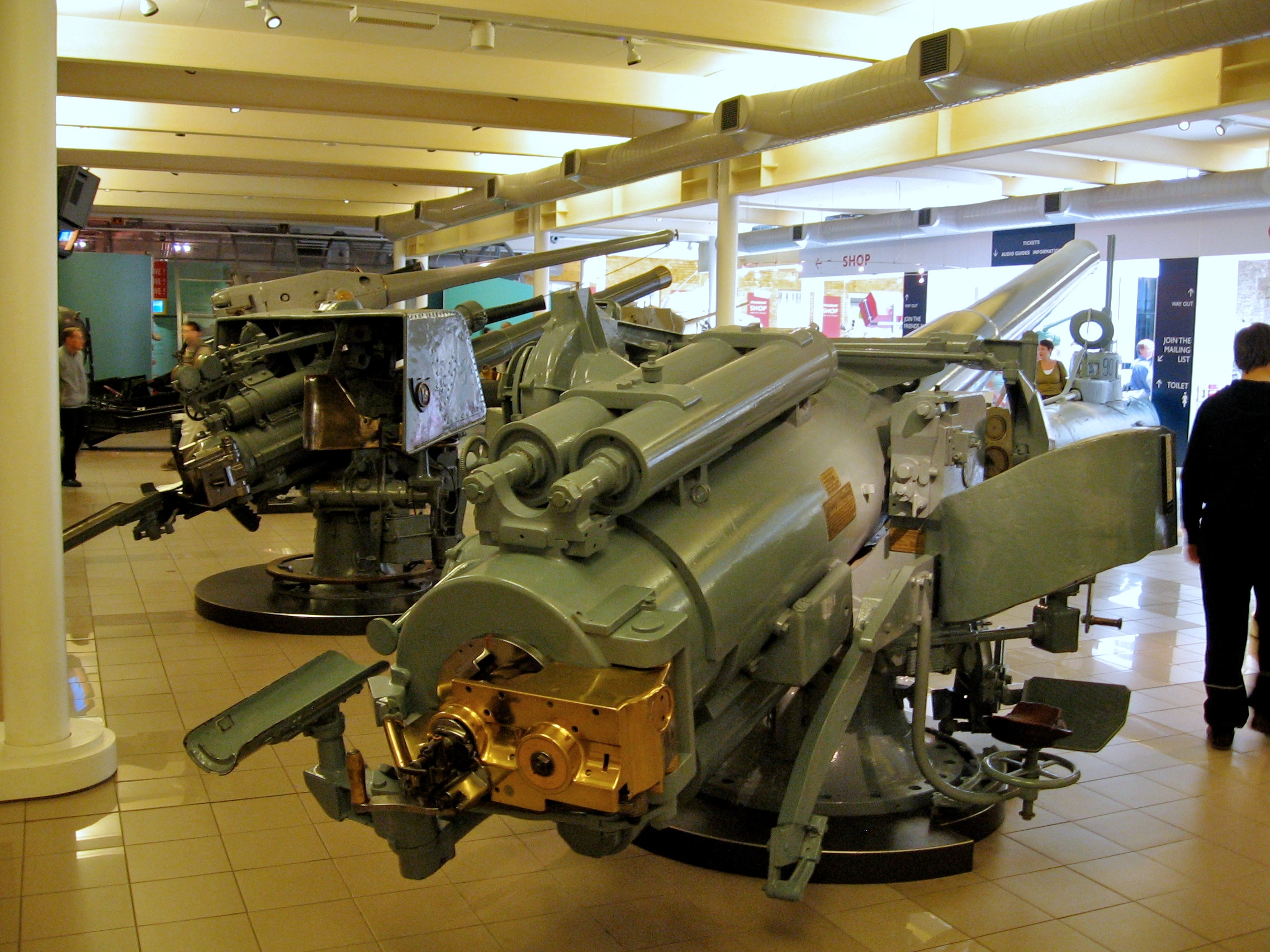
Coventry Ordnance Works 5.5 inch gun

In 1908-1909 there was a very public "Mulliner scandal" because H H Mulliner was shown to have embellished reports of German rearmament in the hope of improving their order book for large naval guns. He was asked to tender his resignation from Cammell Laird's board and it was accepted. However he received a settlement of £100,000 which was in addition to the payment of £142,566 for the shares on the merger of the businesses in 1903.

Among H H Mulliner's benefactions were gifts to the Victoria and Albert Museum in 1913 and the purchase in 1920 and "complete modernisation at considerable expense" of Rainham Hall built 1729 in the London Borough of Havering as a setting for part of his outstanding collections of English furniture and English pottery.

=== Cammell Laird ===
H H Mulliner's carriage building business, now part of Cammell Laird, built a few bodies for Daimler before it was decided the future lay in making relatively large production runs for motor companies that did not have their own facilities.

=== Calthorpe ===
An early contract was gained from Calthorpe, then a booming company, leading to probably the entire output going to them and eventual close financial and corporate links between the two. Mulliners was taken over by Calthorpe Motor Company in 1917.

== Mulliners Limited ==
After Calthorpe failed in 1924, the managing director of Mulliners, Louis Antweiler, who was also on the Calthorpe managing board, arranged to buy the coachbuilding company which he renamed Mulliners Limited. He obtained contracts with Clyno and Austin for whom he made many Weymann style fabric bodies for the Austin 7. When the fashion for fabric bodies declined, the business with Austin went but was replaced by orders from Hillman, Humber, Standard and Lanchester.

Sunbeam 16
Weymann fabric
six-light saloon 1930

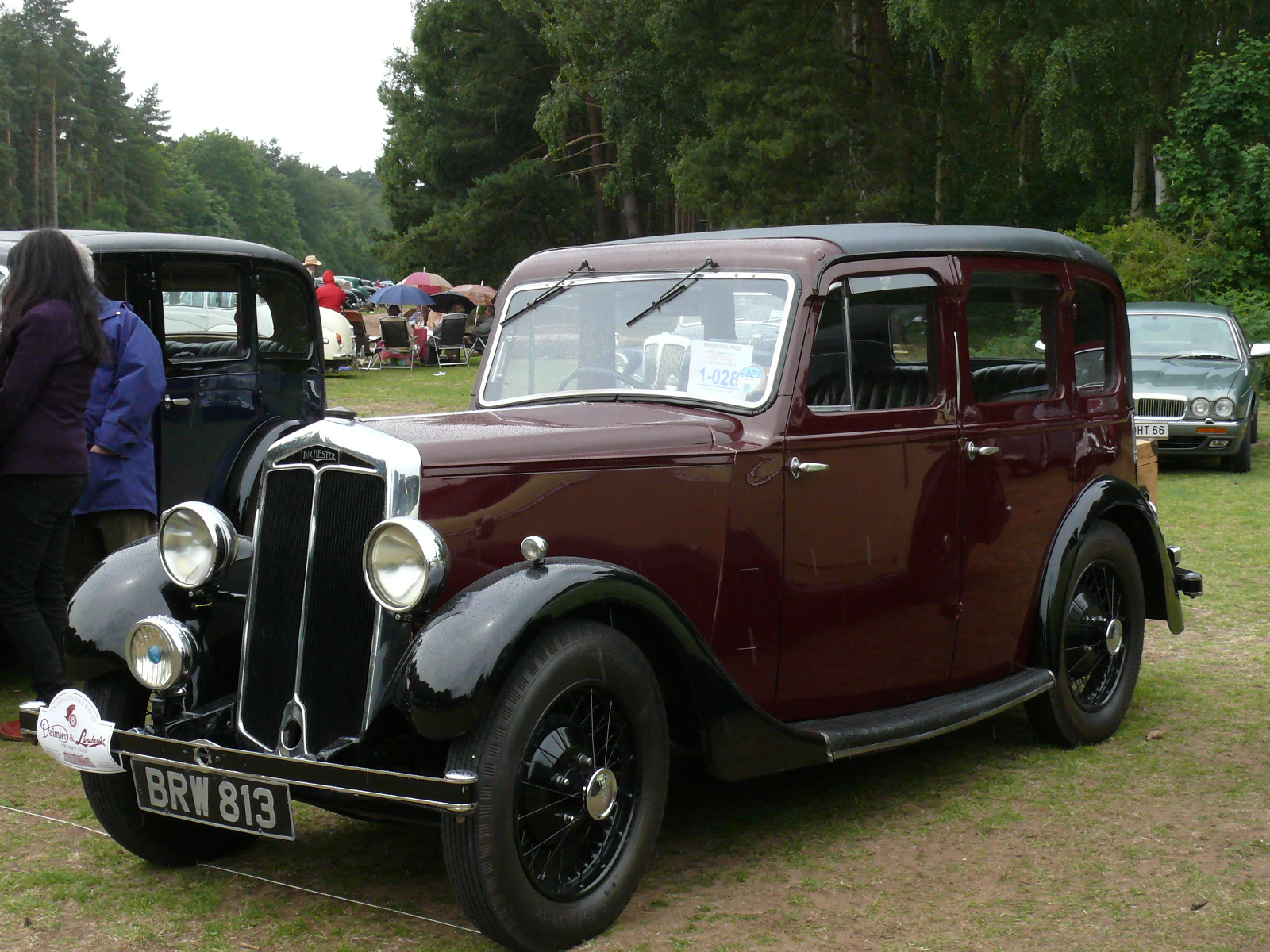
Lanchester Ten
six-light saloon 1936

Lanchester Ten
fixed head coupé 1934

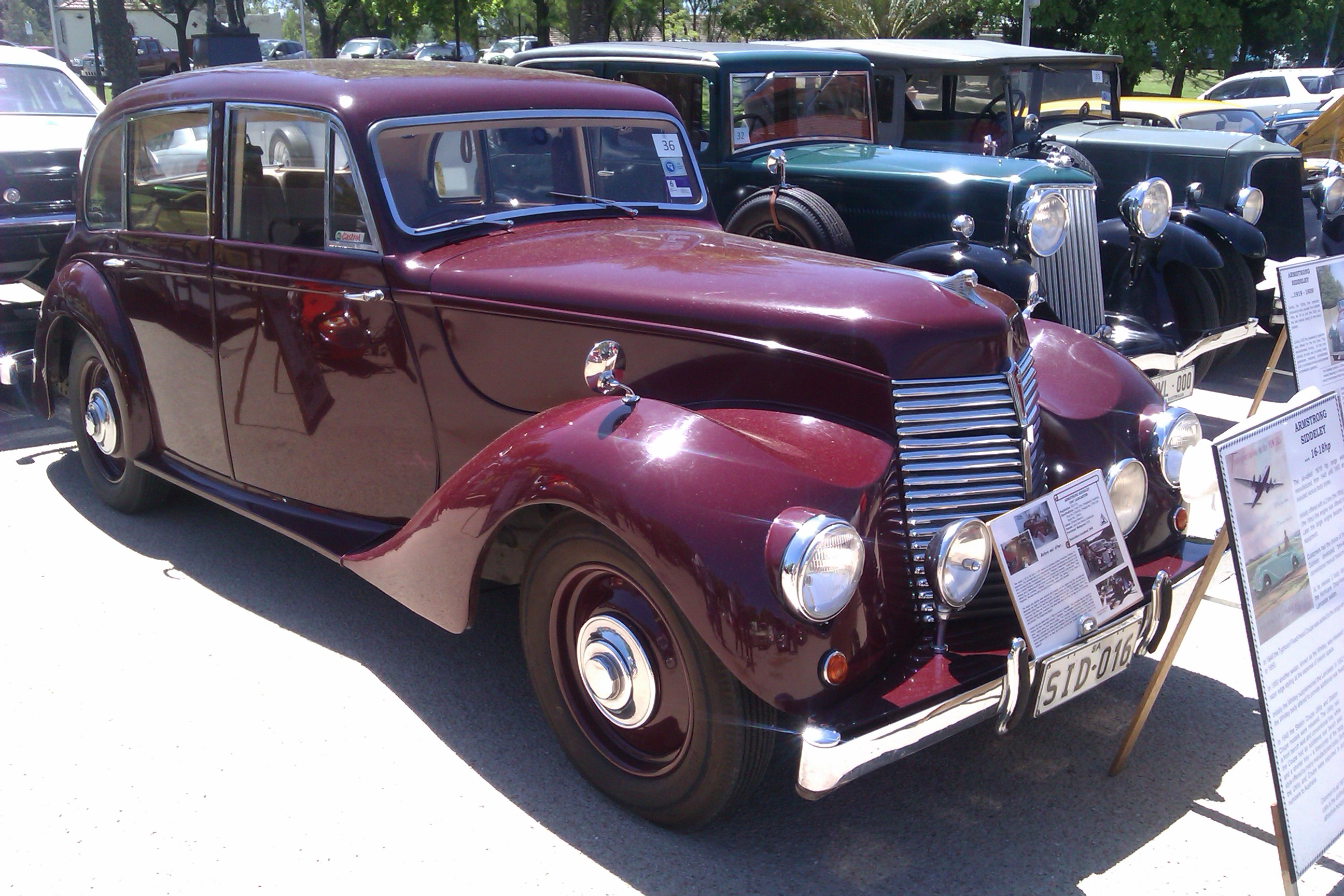
Armstrong-Siddeley Lancaster
six-light saloon 1947

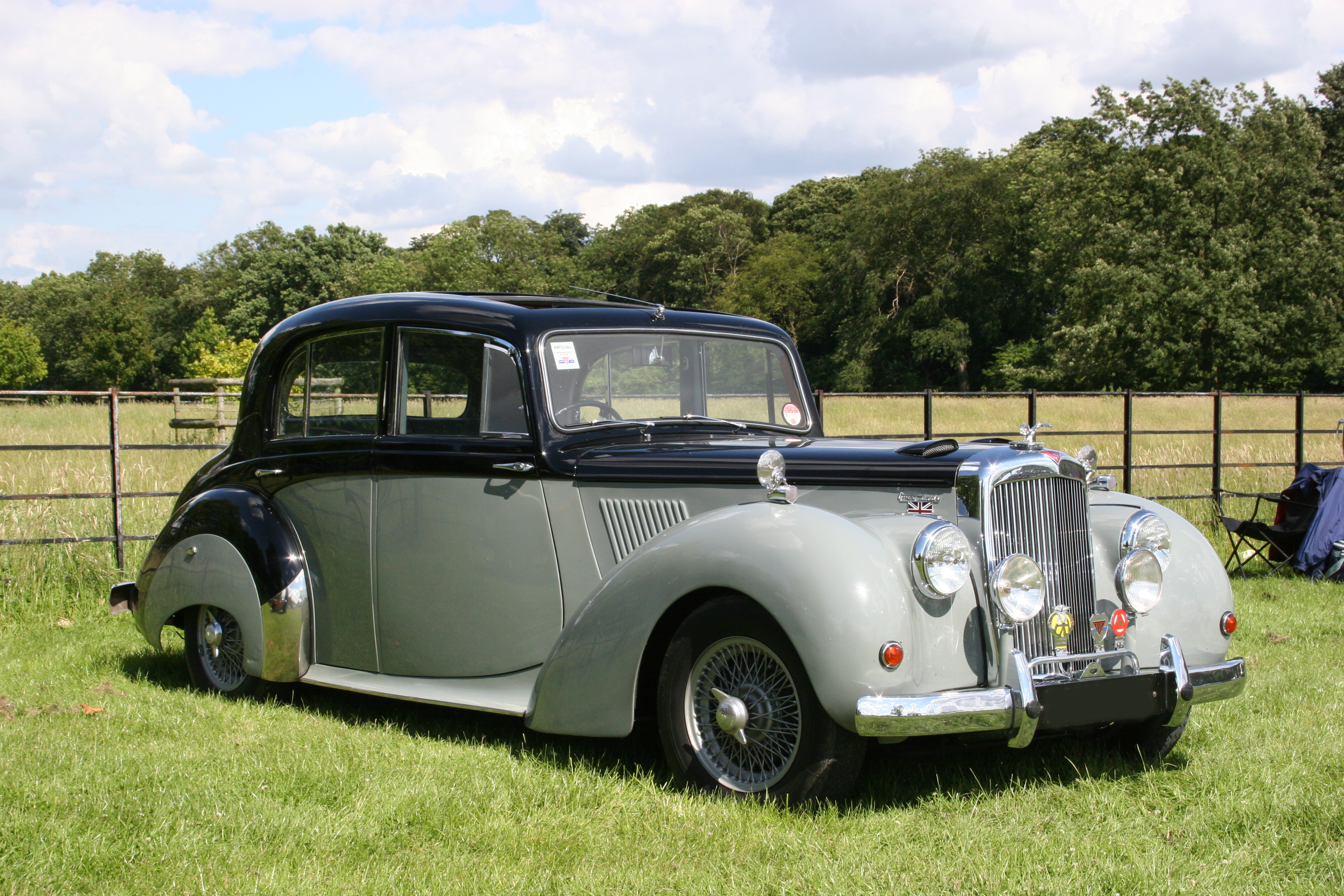
Alvis Three Litre
TC21 Grey Lady
sports saloon 1953

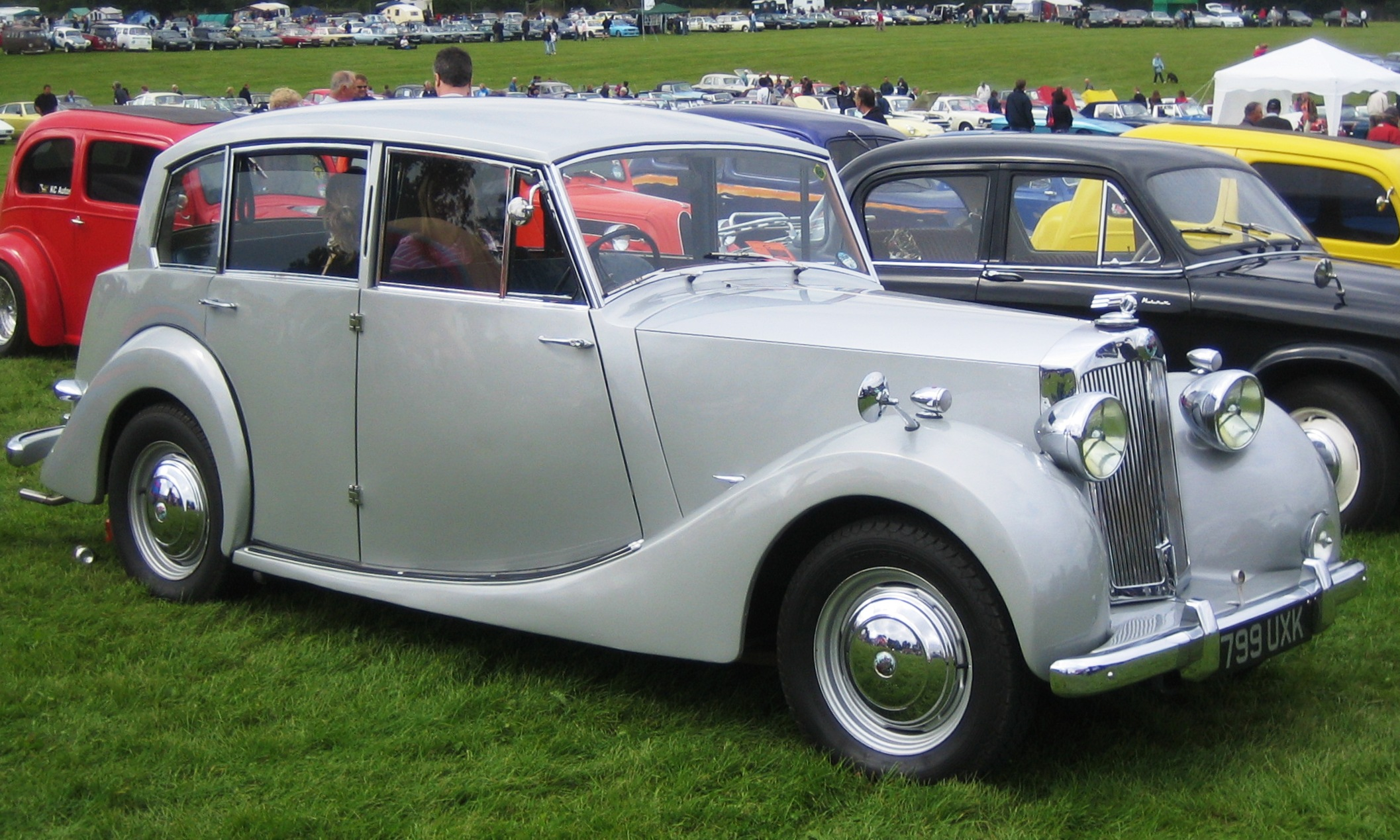
Triumph Renown
six-light saloon 1954
This body was intended for the cancelled new 1940 Alvis Silver Eagle

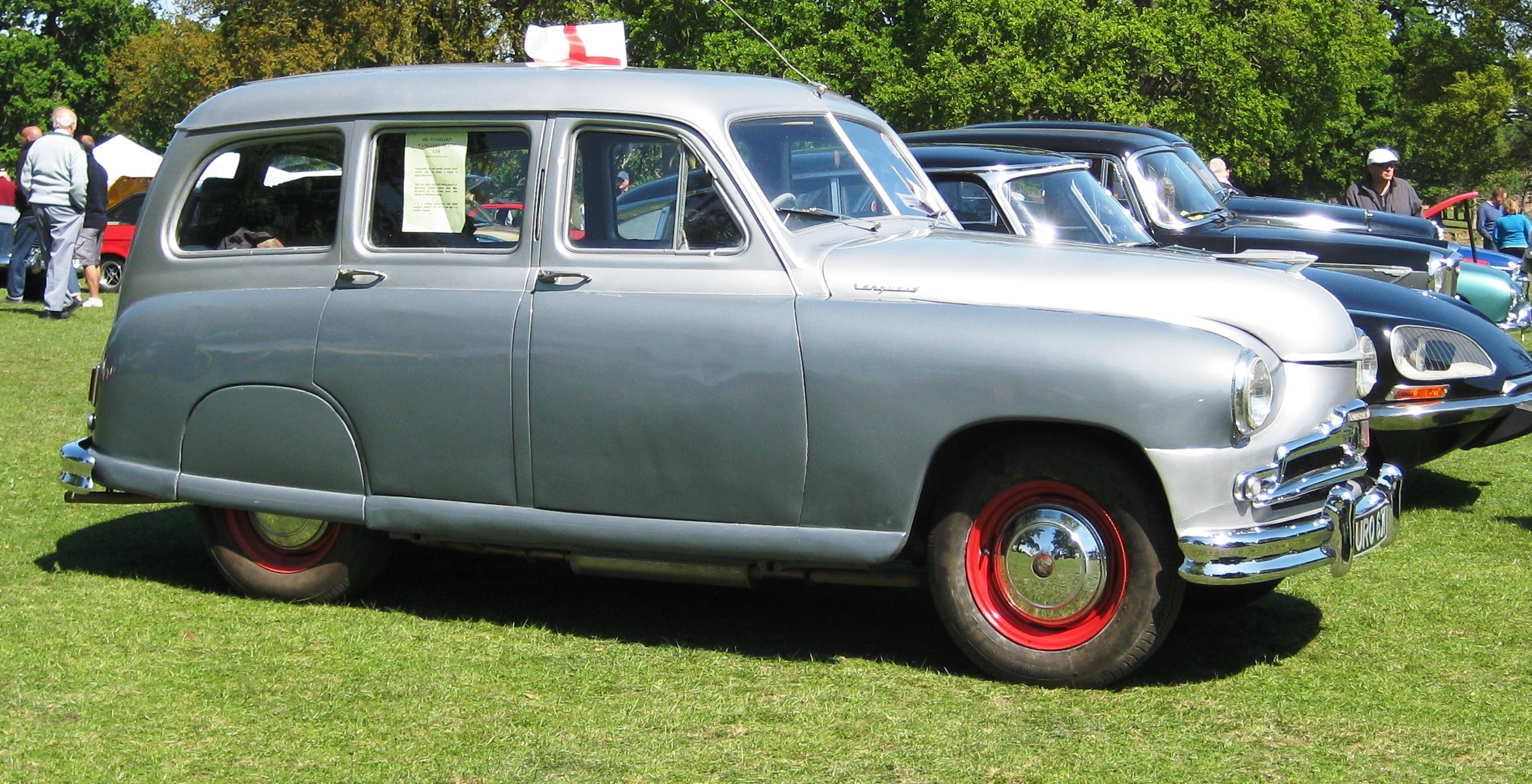
Standard Vanguard
estate car 1955

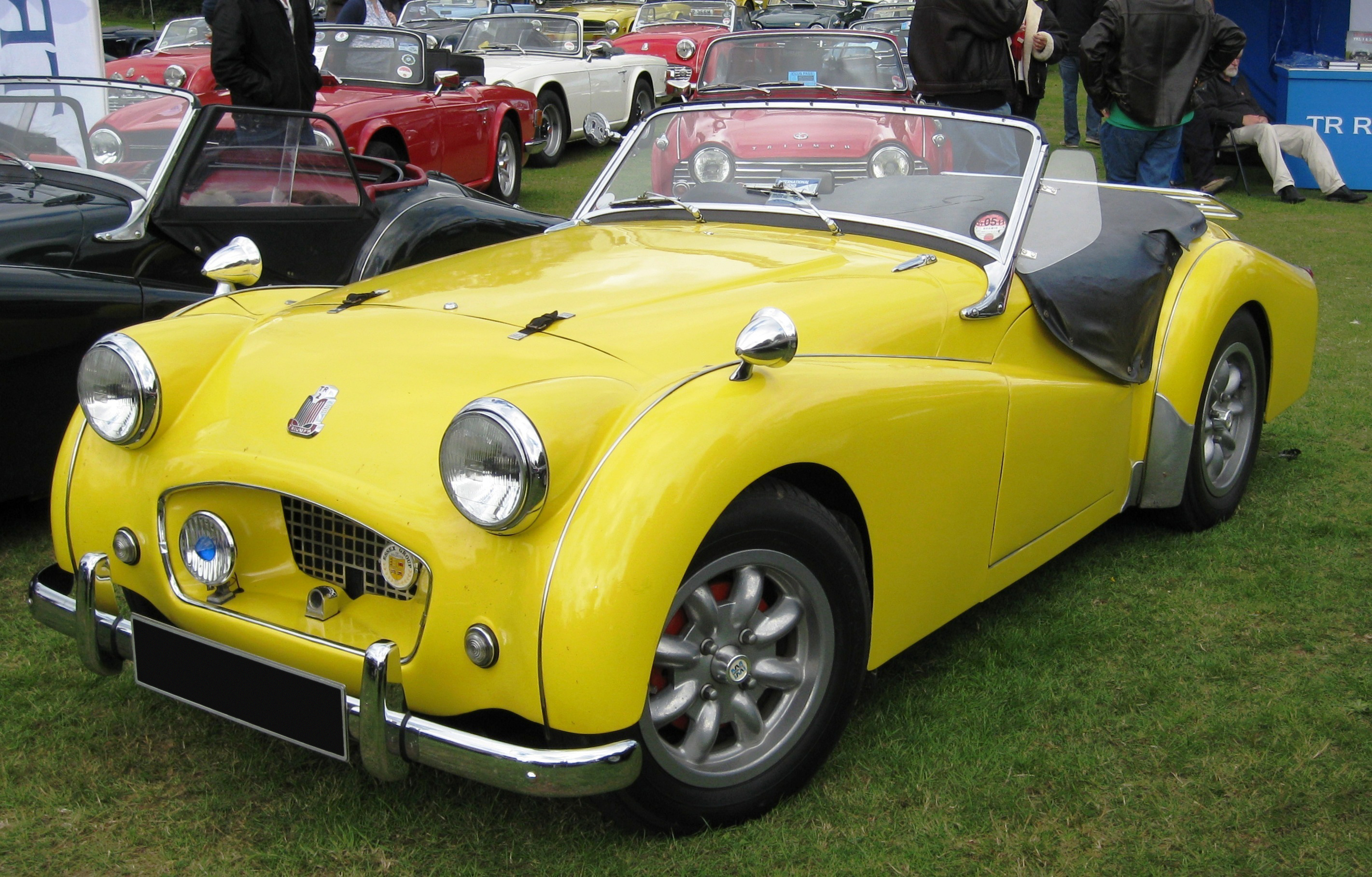
Triumph TR2 1956

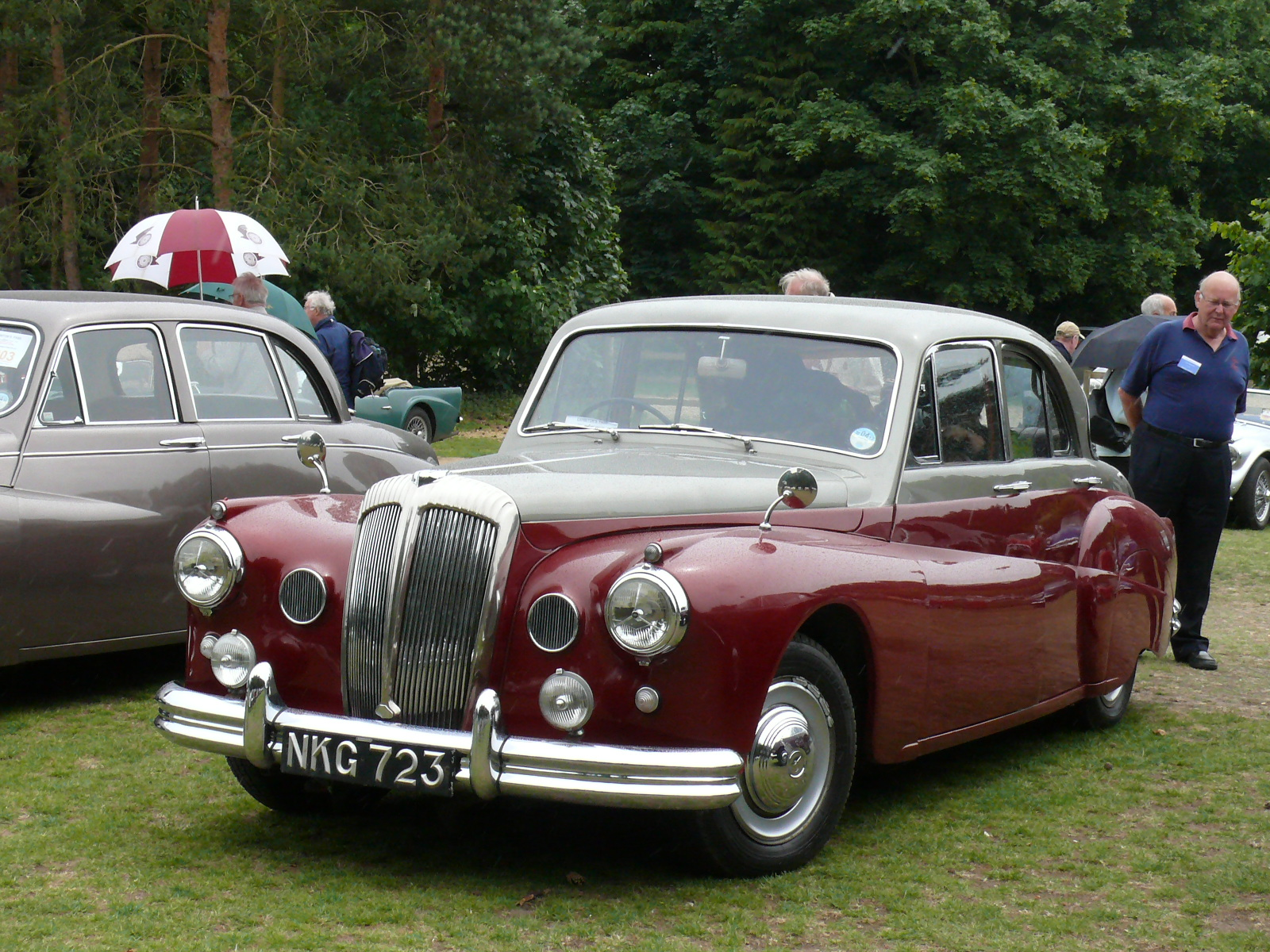
Daimler Sportsman 1957

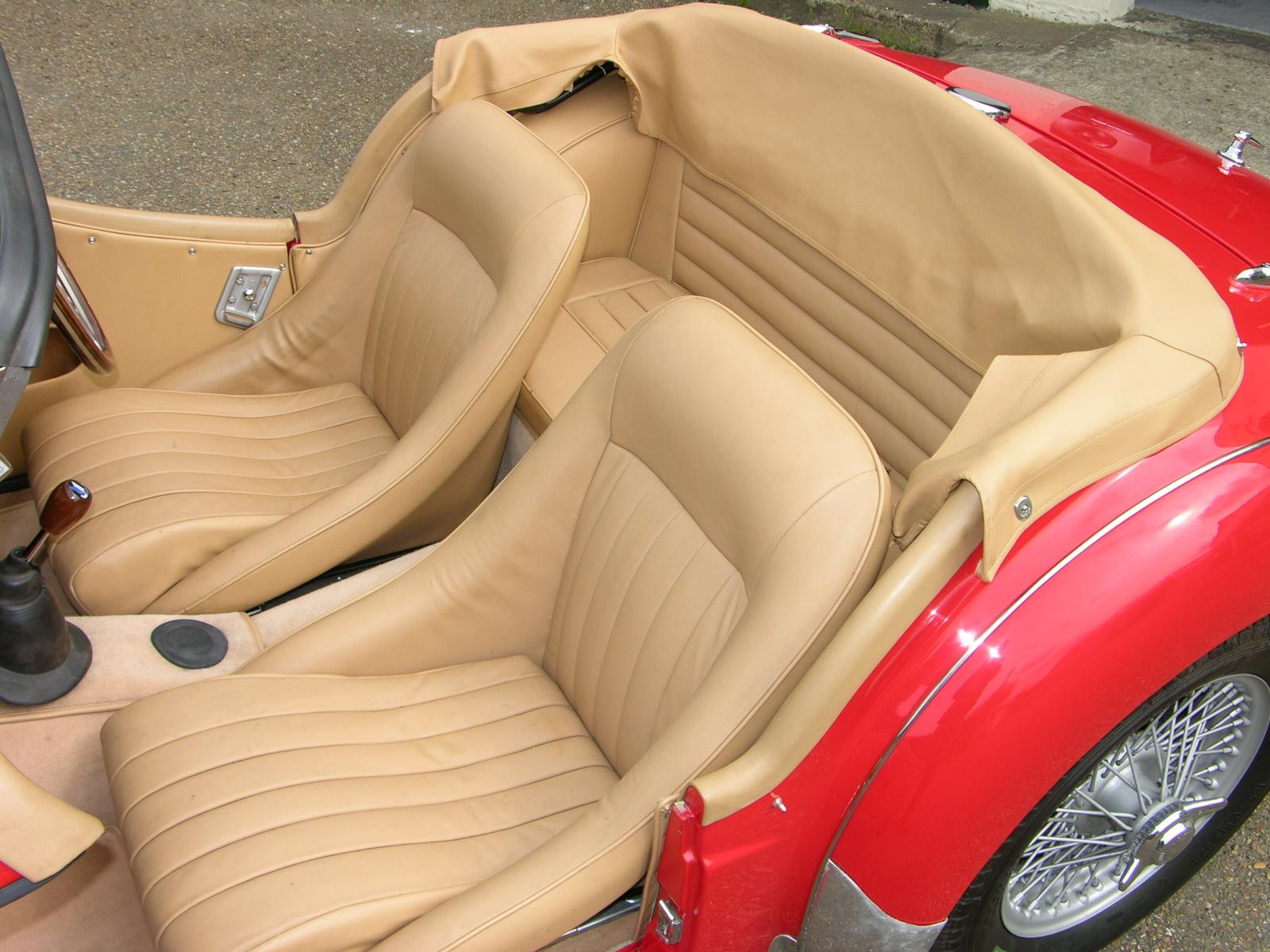
Triumph TR3A 1961

=== Listed company ===
In 1929, the company went public. The main business was now with Daimler and Lanchester, making the bodies for the cheaper range of cars with, confusingly, Arthur Mulliner of Northampton making the up-market models. Alvis was added to the list of customers.

During World War II they made bodies for military vehicles and troop carrying gliders.

== Bus and coach body building ==
Military contracts for aircraft and vehicles were given to the company with the advent of World War II. These included the supply of single-deck austerity bus bodies for Bedford OWB chassis. Duple Coachbuilders designed and built a few bus bodies after the war, but were up to capacity in building their Duple Vista coach body, so they sub-contracted their bus body building to Mulliner in 1947, built on the OWB successor, the OB chassis. Vauxhall dealers also ordered bodies direct to Mulliners and the body was built until 1950, of which many were exported, some to oil companies in the Middle East and South America. In the 1950s they secured large contracts for utilitarian bus bodies for the three armed services and government agencies (on the Bedford OB and later Bedford SB and Bedford SBG chassis) and also some for some municipal bus operators, such as Douglas, IOM who, in 1957, had bodies built on Guy Otter chassis, at least one surviving into preservation.

One of its last efforts was an adventurous coach body appearing on a modified Guy Warrior chassis, registered 647BKL, displayed at the 1958 Commercial Motor Show and now preserved. Later that year, when Standard-Triumph purchased the company, it sold the bus-building division to Marshall’s of Cambridge.

== Standard-Triumph ==
After the war, body-building for cars resumed with Aston Martin, Armstrong Siddeley and Triumph joining the list of customers. Standard-Triumph had, by then, a shortage of body-building capacity and this led them to buy the company in 1958, by which time Mulliners were building 700 car bodies each week.

== Closure ==
On 7 December 1960, a shock announcement by Standard-Triumph International, which was about to be sold to prosperous trucks and buses manufacturer Leyland Motors Limited, revealed that the factory would close. "Mulliners Limited, one of the oldest body firms in the motor trade, employs about 800 workers having recently laid off some 750 as redundant because of a shortage of orders". Their products would "continue to be made by other Midlands factories within the S-TI group".

== See also ==
- Arthur Mulliner of Northampton
- Mulliner (London) Limited
- H. J. Mulliner & Co. of Chiswick (later Mulliner Park Ward)
