= Arthur Mulliner =

British coachbuilding company

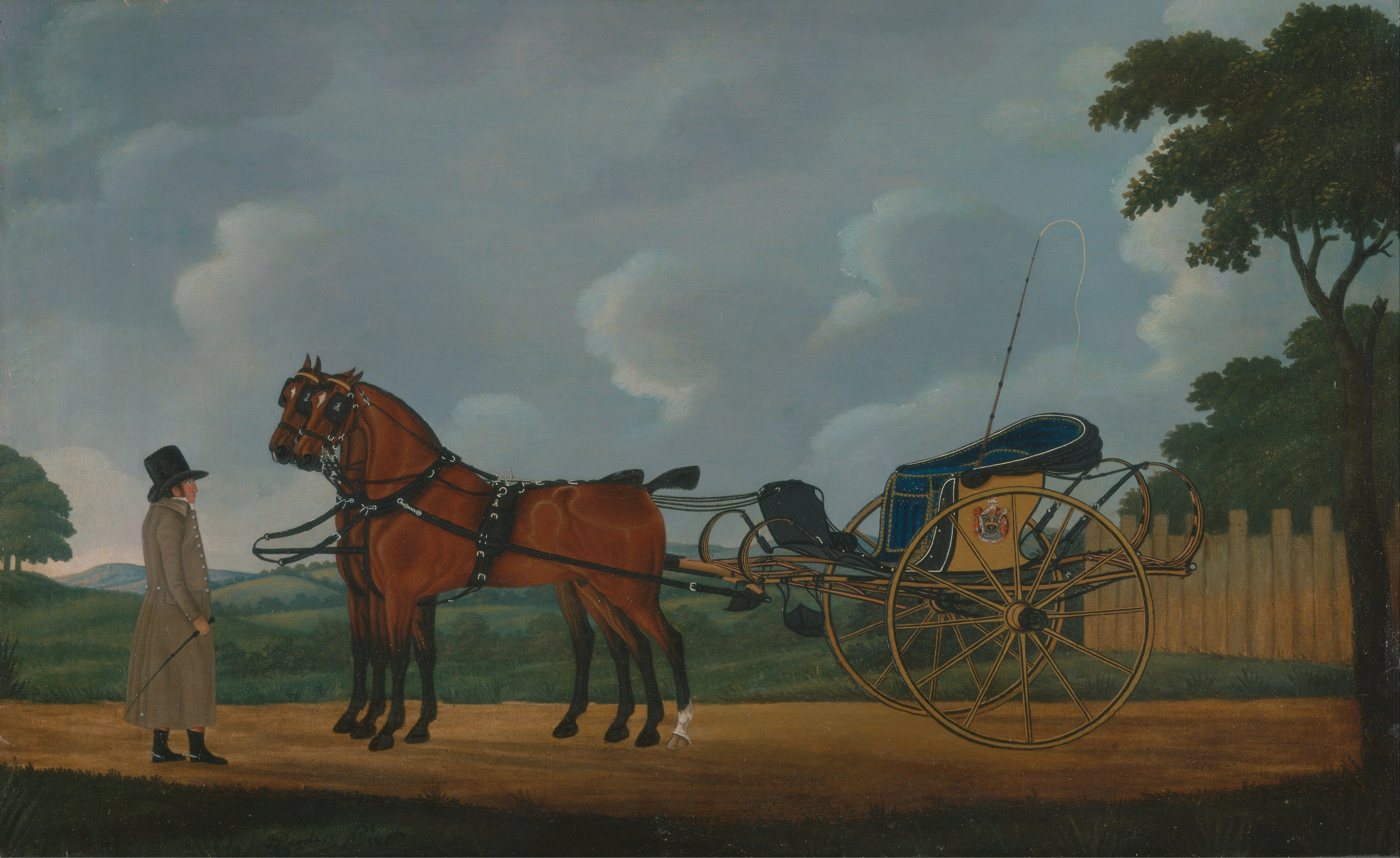
A curricle, 1806

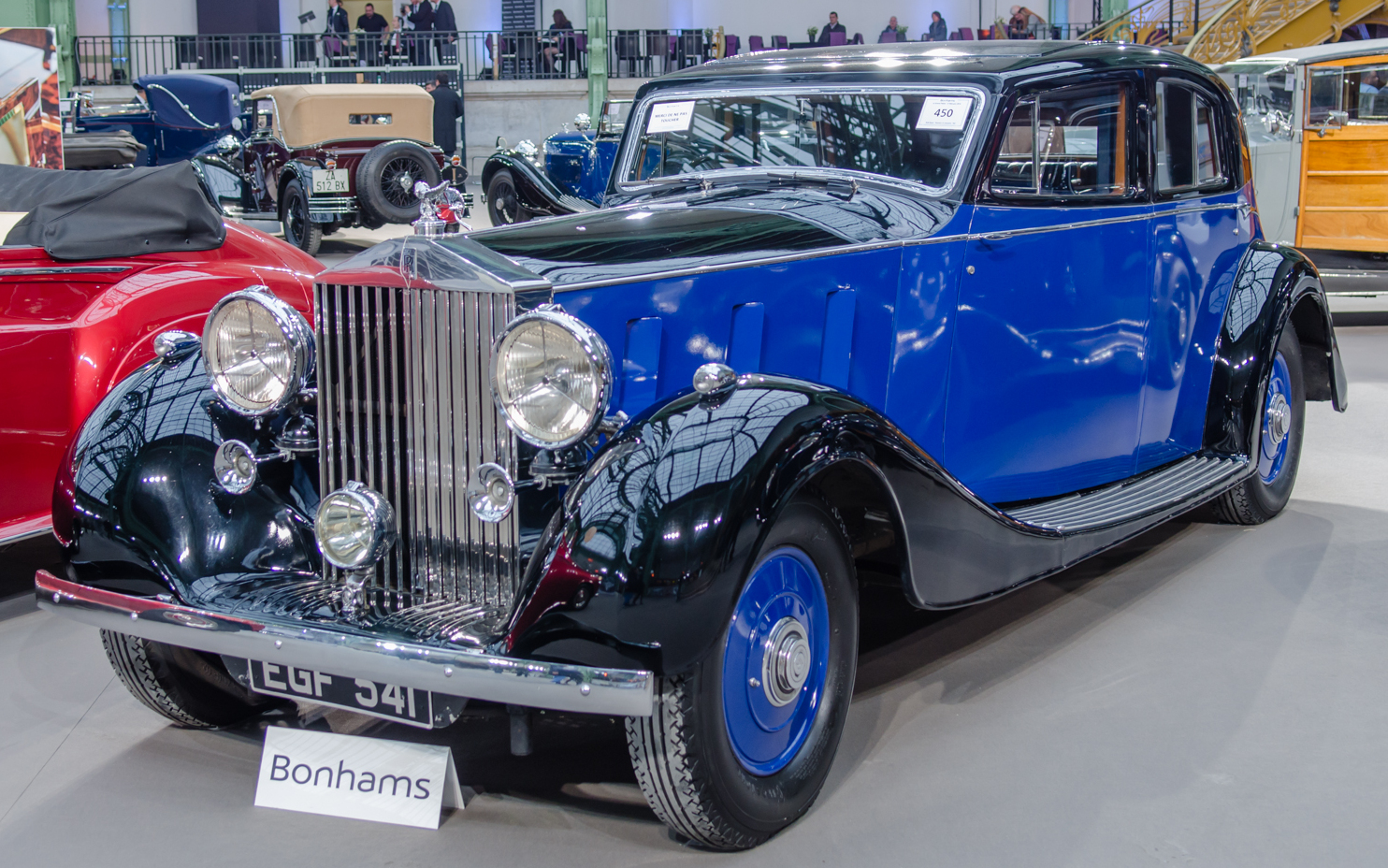
A limousine, 1937 on a Rolls-Royce Phantom III chassis

Arthur Mulliner was the 20th century name of a coachbuilding business founded in Northampton in 1760 which remained in family ownership. The business was acquired by Henlys Limited in 1940 and lost its separate identity.

== Mulliner Northampton ==
Henry Mulliner (1827-1887) of Leamington Spa was the second son of Francis Mulliner (1789-1841) of Northampton and Leamington Spa and a direct descendant of the Mulliner who built the business making mail coaches in Northampton around 1760. Henry and his wife born Ann Robson had six sons and six daughters

Henry's brothers were:

- Francis Mulliner (1824-1886) eldest son, who stayed in charge of the Northampton business until 1870, his mother died in 1875 aged 79, when he purchased Robert's Liverpool business and went to live in Birkenhead. His second son was Augustus Greville Mulliner who took over the Liverpool business.
- Robert Bouverie Mulliner (1830-1902) who went to Liverpool in 1854 and started his own coachbuilding business in Great Charlotte Street. In 1870 he sold out to Francis and moved to Chiswick near London. His second son was Henry Jervis Mulliner of Chiswick, founder of H. J. Mulliner & Co.
- William Rice Mulliner (1834-1863) bought a commission in the army and died unmarried aged 29 while acting governor of Lagos Colony

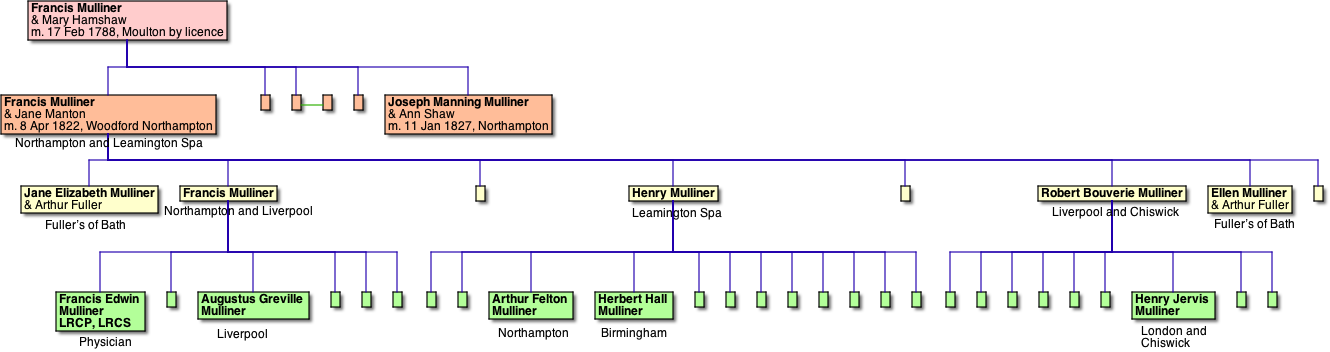
Family tree

== Arthur Mulliner ==
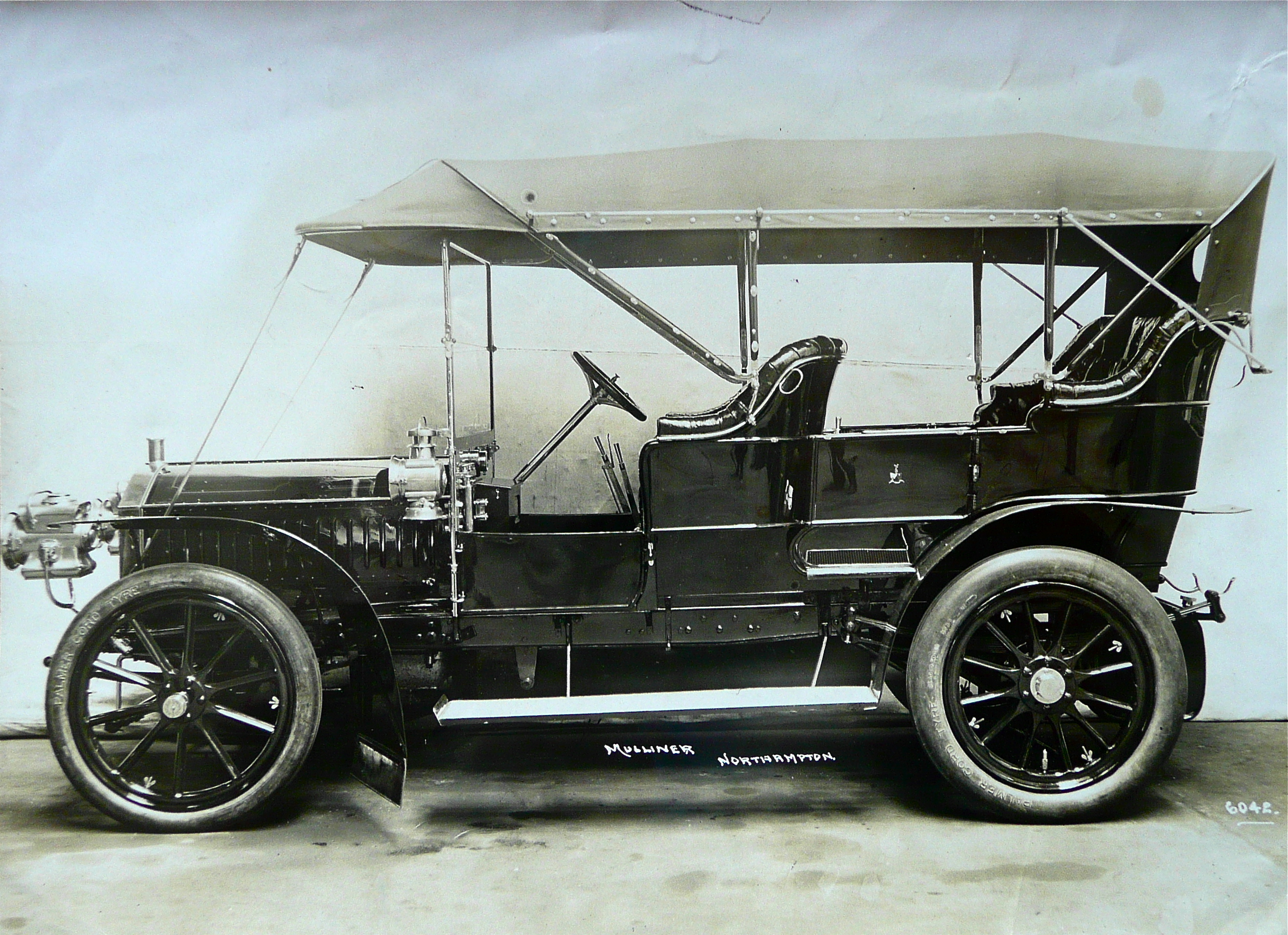
early motorcar body by Mulliner of Northampton for Sir Alfred Herbert Napier chassis

Henry's second son Colonel Arthur Felton Mulliner (1859-1946), born and raised in Leamington Spa, who had been managing the works in Northampton married in September 1887 the eldest daughter of the founder of Northampton's Albion Steam Brewery (see Ratliffe's Celebrated Stout). Soon after his father's death in November 1887 Arthur announced in the Northampton Mercury he would carry on the business of the late firm of H Mulliner & Co Limited of Northampton, Leamington and Warwick in the same Northampton premises in Bridge Street on his own account.

Arthur Mulliner took the Northampton coachbuilding business into the construction of motor car bodies and by the beginning of 1899 Northampton had built over 150 mainly on Daimler chassis. The relationship with the Daimler business was close.

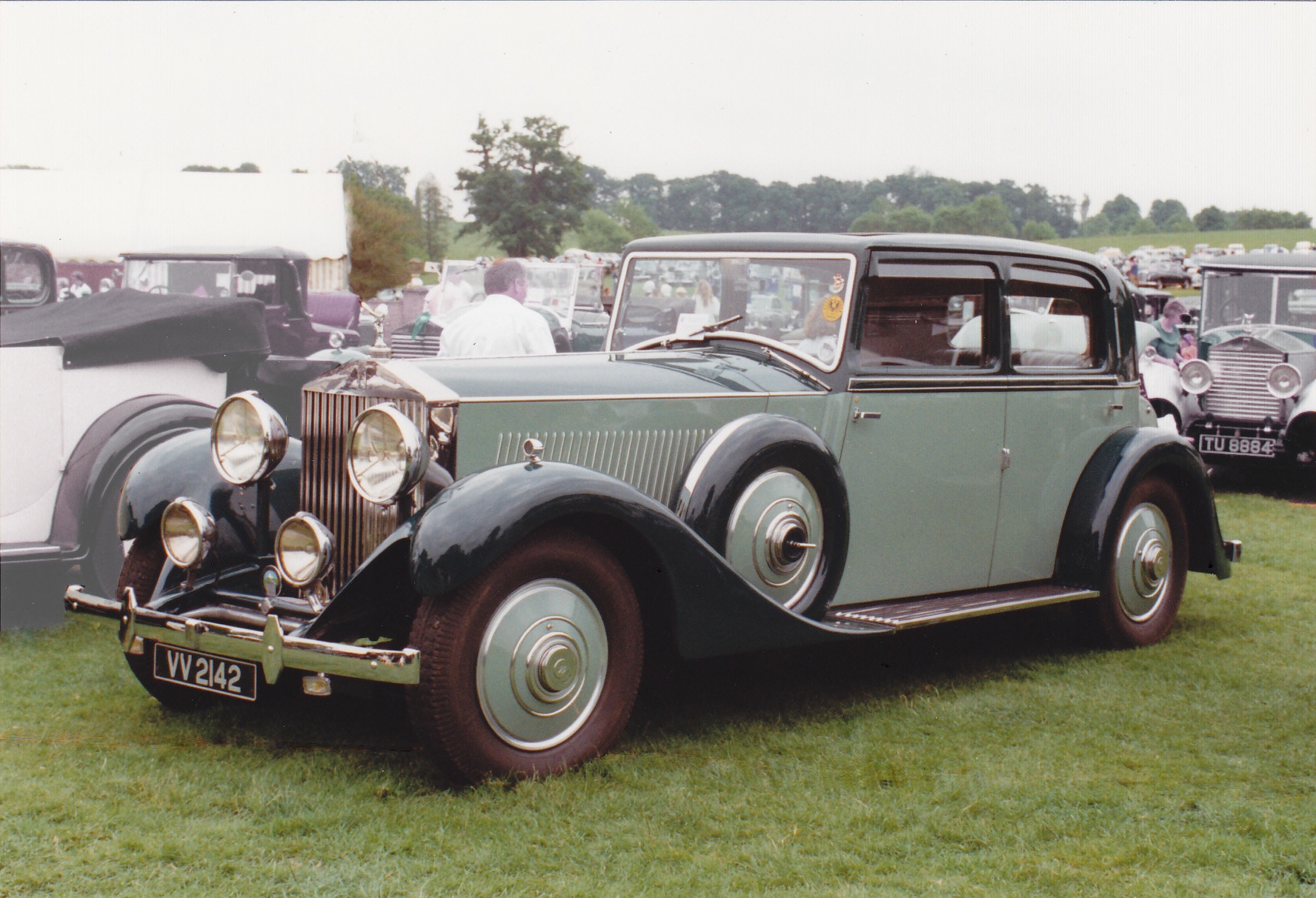
Sports saloon 1933 on a Rolls-Royce Phantom II Continental chassis

=== First manufacturer-organised press road test ===
In July 1897 two lady journalists from The Gentlewoman were driven by Arthur Mulliner in a Daimler (the 75 miles) from Northampton to their offices in Arundel Street, off the Strand in London. They reported the sensation to be like "tobogganing or riding on a switchback railway". They asked Mulliner why he called the car "she", he said because "it took a man to manage her". To prove Mulliner wrong they both took the controls during the journey south.

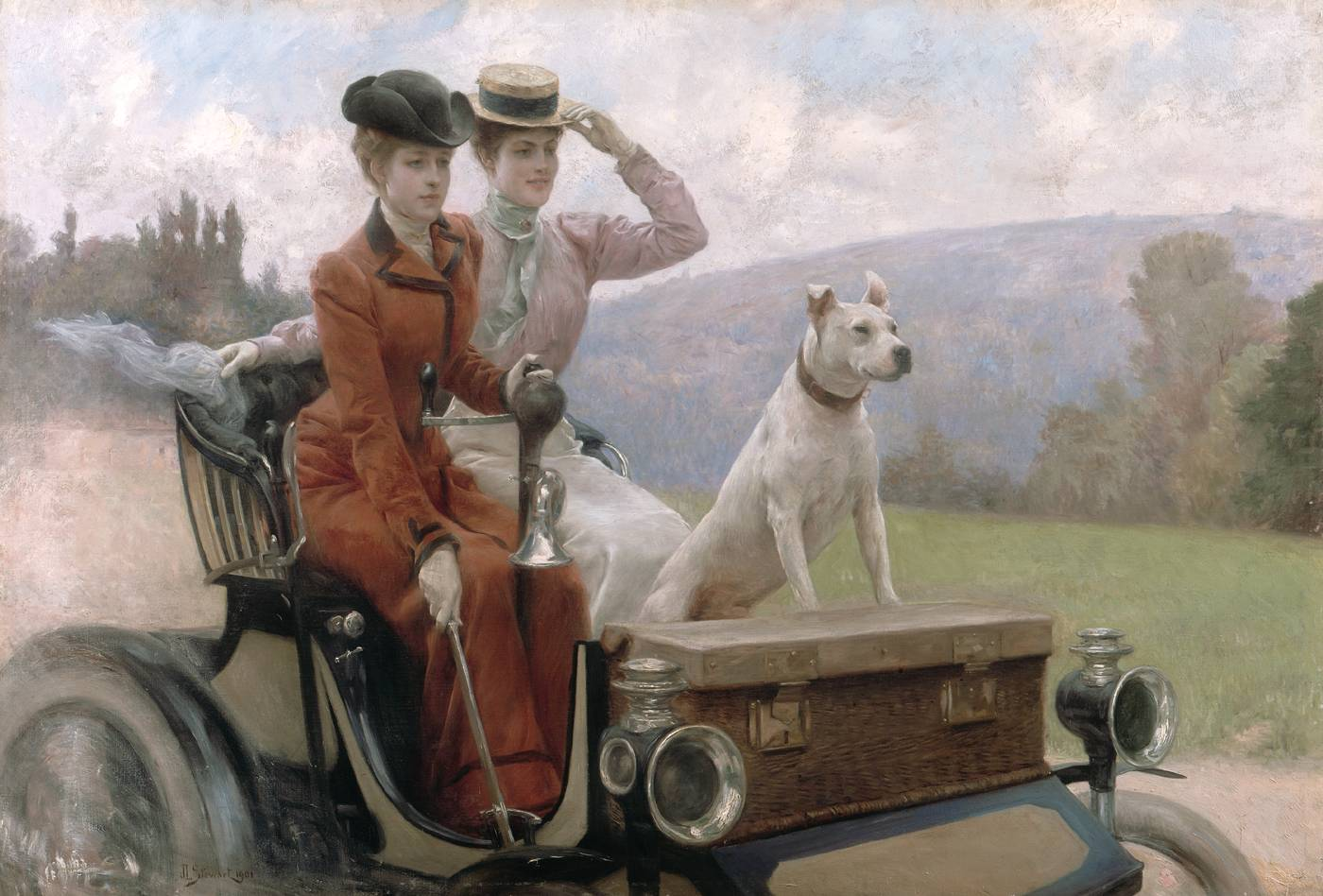
The Goldsmith Ladies in the Bois de Boulogne in 1897 on a Peugeot cart (1901)

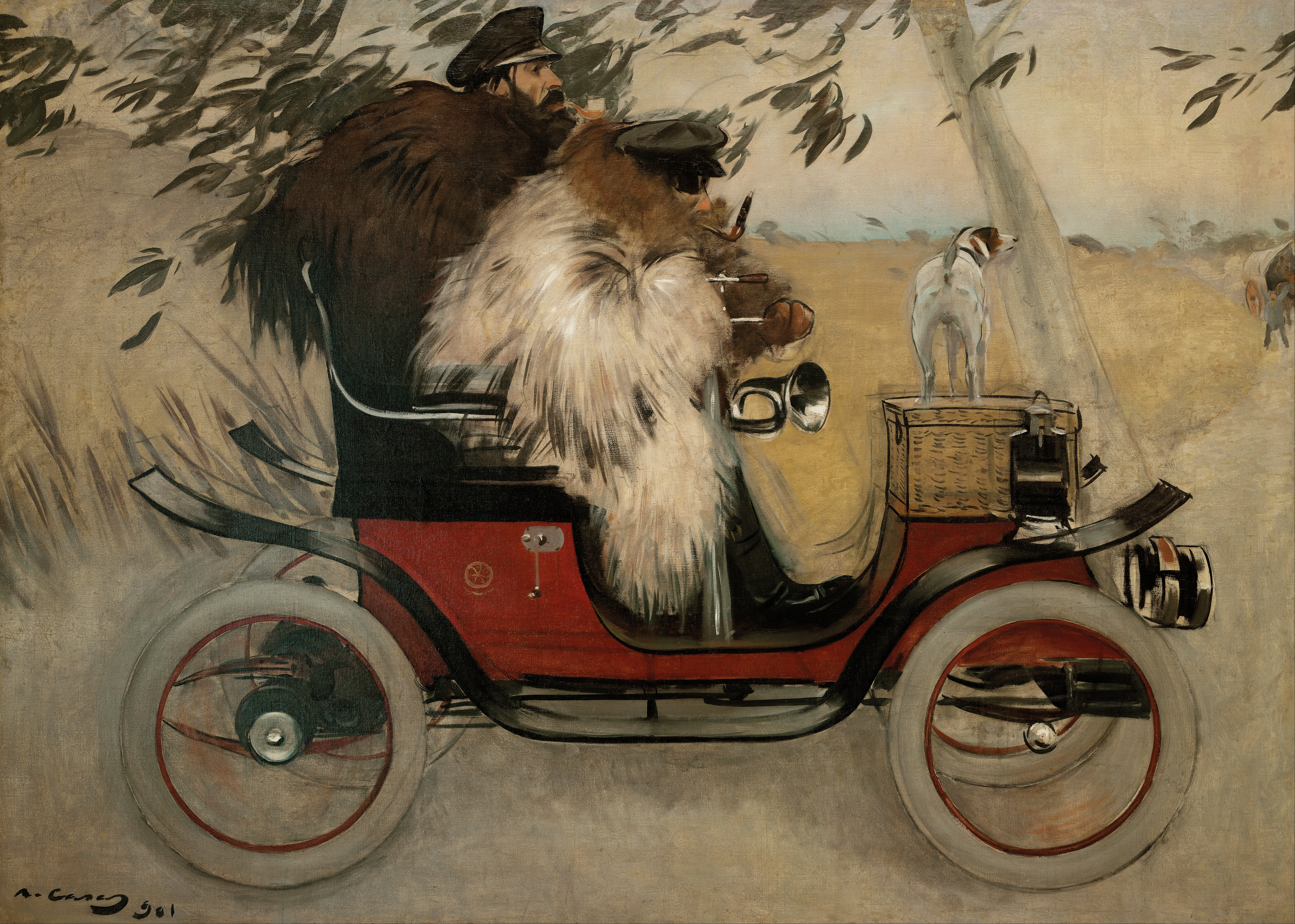
Ramón Casas and Pere Romeu in an Automobile (1901)

Business boomed during the 1920s with orders for bodies on Armstrong Siddeley and Vauxhall cars being exhibited at the 1920 London Motor Show.

In 1907 a new sales office and works was opened in Long Acre, London.

In the 1930s although orders for the more traditional makers such as Derby's Rolls-Royce and Bentley continued, large production runs from the middle market makers were proving harder to get and in 1940 the business was sold to the car distributor Henlys which closed the coach building business and dropped the name after Arthur's death in 1946 but kept the sales and marketing operation which lasted until 1976.

=== Aeroplanes ===
A few years before the first World War some aeroplanes were developed and built in a converted ice skating rink at the Battersea, London works - 2 to 16 Vardens Road, Battersea.

Herbert Hall Mulliner. In the mid 1880s Arthur's brother H H Mulliner (1861-1924) started a coachbuilding business in Birmingham because Leamington Spa had fallen out of fashion and that coachbuilding business became Mulliners (Birmingham).

Henry Jervis Mulliner. In 1900 the motor-car part of the London operation jointly owned by Mulliner Northampton and Mulliner Liverpool (Note: Mulliner Motor Body Co., Liverpool and Church Accrington. Augustus Greville Mulliner born 1861 was in ill-health and died aged 43 in Davos Switzerland 22 February 1905) was purchased by H J Mulliner (1870-1967), son of R B Mulliner (1830-1902) of Chiswick and he put its ownership into his company formed in 1897, H J Mulliner Limited.

== Premises ==
Northampton

- Works 73 to 83 Bridge Street, and Victoria Gardens, Northampton
- Showroom 73 Bridge Street Northampton

London

- 56 Brook Street, Grosvenor Square W1
- 28 Brook Street London W1 This showroom was opened in the early 1870s by Francis Mulliner (1824-1886) by then of Liverpool.
  In 1882 A G Mulliner of Liverpool and A F Mulliner of Northampton placed the showroom ownership in a jointly held company, Mulliner London Limited.
  In 1896 H J Mulliner "joined his cousins in Mulliner London Limited" (probably as an employee). Then in 1900 he bought from his cousins the car side of that Brook Street business and put it in the ownership of H J Mulliner & Co, Brook Street, Mayfair.
- 13 to 25 Long Acre London WC, Mulliner Coachworks Limited —Long Acre Works Colonel Arthur Mulliner of the Society of Motor Manufacturers and Traders.
- Vardens Road Battersea 1909-1912
- 54 Baker Street London by 1923

== Cars by Arthur Mulliner of London and Northampton ==
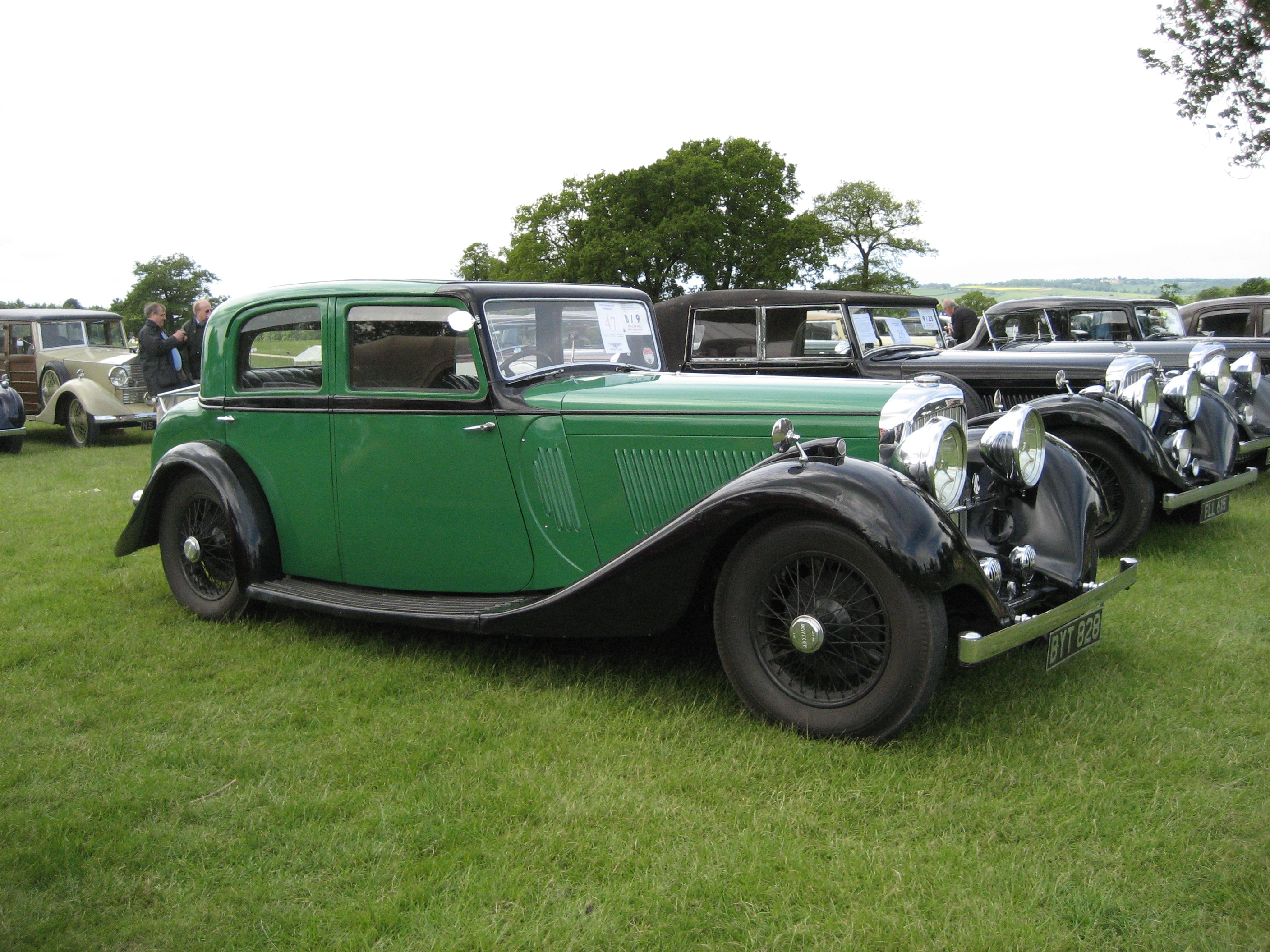
Sports saloon 1935 Bentley 3½-litre chassis

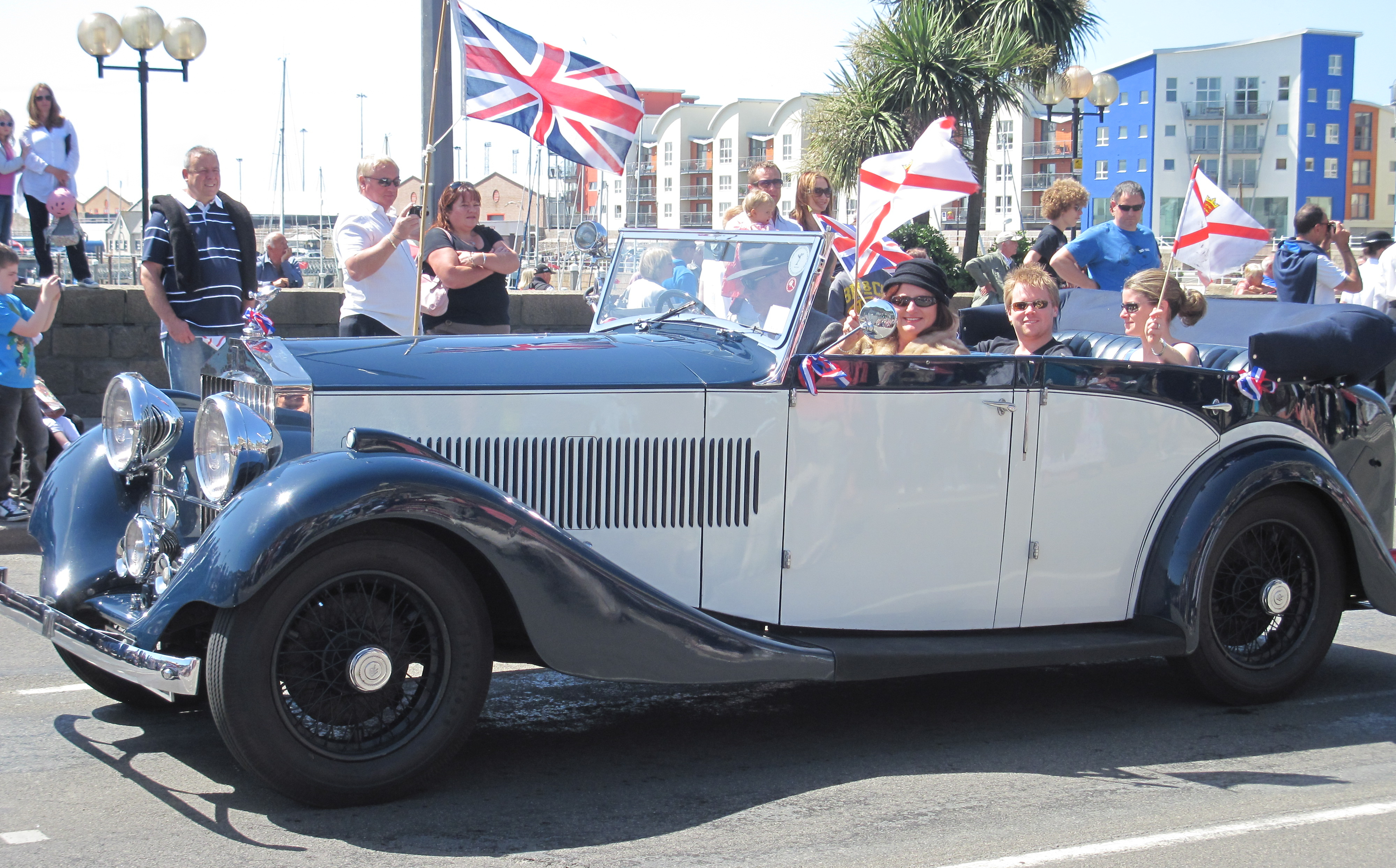
Open tourer 1935 Rolls-Royce 20/25 chassis

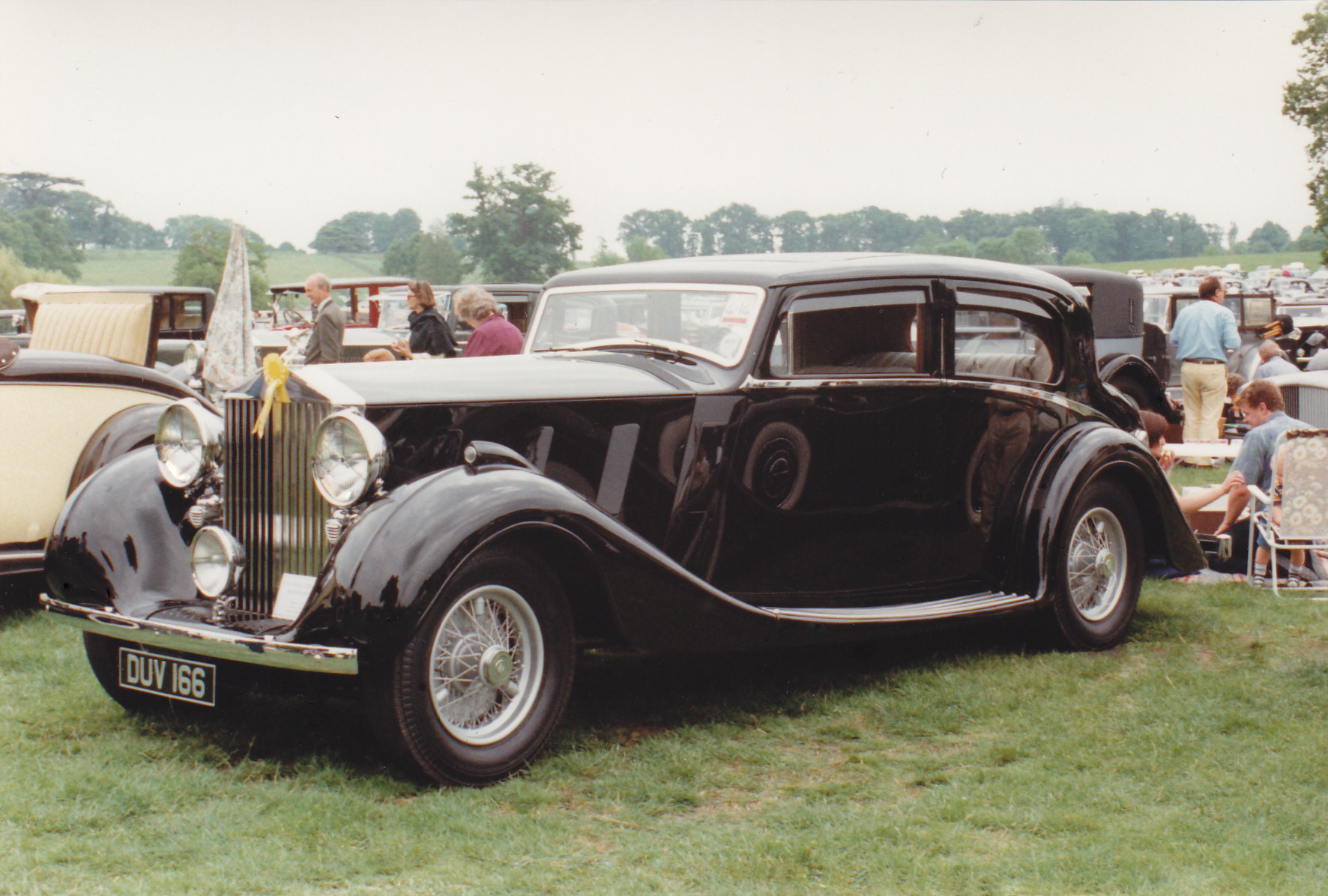
Sports saloon 1936 Rolls-Royce Phantom III chassis
