= Double-clutching (technique) =

Method of shifting gears

Double-clutching (also called double de-clutching outside of the United States) is a method of shifting gears used primarily for vehicles with an unsynchronized manual transmission, such as commercial trucks and specialty vehicles. While double clutching is not necessary in a vehicle that has a synchronized manual transmission, the technique can be advantageous for smoothly downshifting in order to accelerate and, when done correctly, it reduces wear on the synchronizers, which act to equalize transmission input and output speeds to allow downshifting.

With this method, instead of disengaging the clutch (pressing the clutch pedal) once and shifting directly to another gear, the driver first engages the transmission in neutral before shifting to the next gear. The clutch is depressed and released with each change. A related downshifting or engine-speed-matching technique is heel-and-toe shifting, in which the throttle is blipped (i.e. momentarily opened during downshifting) by the driver's heel during braking.

== History ==
Before the introduction of transmission synchronizers in 1927, double clutching was a technique required to prevent damage to a vehicle's gearing during shifts. Due to its difficulty and often redundancy, and the advent of synchronized gearing systems, it has largely fallen into disuse in light vehicles. However, many tractor units are still supplied with an unsynchronised gearbox which requires a double-clutching technique to be used.

== Technique ==
In a non-synchromesh gearbox with neutral between gears, a typical shift involves two gear changes, once into neutral, and again into the target gear. During any shift, disconnecting drive components via a clutch unloads the force from the opposing components from the engine and transmission. Disengaging the clutch for each shift out of, and then into, each gear is double clutching, or declutching. Due to the absence of a neutral spacing, double-clutching is impossible for sequential gear changes, as with a fully sequential gearbox used in motorcycles and racecars.

The double-clutching technique involves the following steps:

- The accelerator (throttle) is released, the clutch pedal is pressed and the gearbox is shifted into neutral.
- The clutch pedal is then released, and the driver matches the engine speed to the gear speed either using the throttle (accelerator), when changing to a lower gear, or waiting for the engine speed to decrease, when changing to a higher gear, to a level suitable for shifting into the next gear.
- At the moment when the speeds of the input shaft (i.e. the engine speed) and gear are closely matched, the driver then presses the clutch pedal again, shifts into the next gear, and releases the clutch. The result should be a smooth gear change.

Although double clutching is a testing requirement when obtaining a commercial driver's license in some jurisdictions, many truckers learn to shift gears without using the clutch. This is known as floating gears, or float shifting, with the clutch needed only during starting and stopping. However, this is not recommended by non-synchro gearbox manufacturers such as Eaton as it will generally cause additional wear on the gears.

Double clutching can be difficult to master, as it requires the driver to gauge the speed of the vehicle and throttle to the intended gear accurately; vehicle weight and road gradient are important factors as they influence the vehicle's acceleration or deceleration during the shift.

Sometimes, truck drivers use the engine brake to help match the engine speed to the gear. The most common situation is with a loaded vehicle that has no split gears or half gears in the lower range, from gears 1 to 4. In this case, it is especially difficult and sometimes impossible to get from 1 to 2, and sometimes even from 2 to 3 while starting on a hill. The problem is that by the time the engine speed has dropped sufficiently to enable a shift into the higher gear, the vehicle will have slowed down too much or possibly even stopped, making the shift impossible. The engine brakes, which on some models can be set to different intensities (retarding variable numbers of engine cylinders) enable a shift by dropping the engine speed quickly enough to catch the higher gear before the vehicle has decelerated too much. This technique, sometimes called Jake shifting, requires high skill and much practice shifting without the clutch, and is usually not recommended among truck drivers because mistakes can cause damage to the transmission. According to the National Highway Traffic Safety Administration (NHTSA), municipalities across the United States have banned the use of compression-release engine brakes, which includes Jake shifting, because of noise emission.

== Theory ==
The purpose of the double-clutch technique is to aid in matching the rotational speed of the input shaft being driven by the engine to the rotational speed of the gear the driver wishes to select. The output shaft in the transmission is directly driven by the rotating wheels, and each gear set is a different ratio, so in a five-speed transmission in fourth gear, one will have three lower gearsets not engaged spinning at three different, and faster, rates and one higher gear spinning at a slower rate than the input shaft. In order to shift down, the fourth gear has to be disengaged, leaving no gears connected to the input shaft. This is neutral, and the input shaft and gears all need to be accelerated so the speed of the output shaft and the lower gear the operator wishes to select match speeds long enough for the dog clutch to lock them together. When the speeds are matched, the gear will engage smoothly and no clutch is required. If the speeds are not matched, the dog teeth on the collar will "clash" or grate as they attempt to fit into the holes on the desired gear.

A modern synchromesh gearbox accomplishes this synchronization more efficiently. However, when the engine speed is significantly different from the transmission speed, the desired gear can often not be engaged even in a fully synchronized gearbox. An example is trying to shift into a gear while traveling outside the gear's speed or directional range, such as accidentally into first from near the top of the second, or intentionally from reverse to forward gear while still moving at speed. Double clutching, although (slightly) time-consuming, eases gear selection when an extended delay or variance exists between engine and transmission speeds, and reduces wear on the synchronizers (or baulk rings), which are brass cone clutches themselves, and wear very slightly each time they are used to equalize the transmission revs with the output revs.
