= Manual transmission =

Motor vehicle transmission

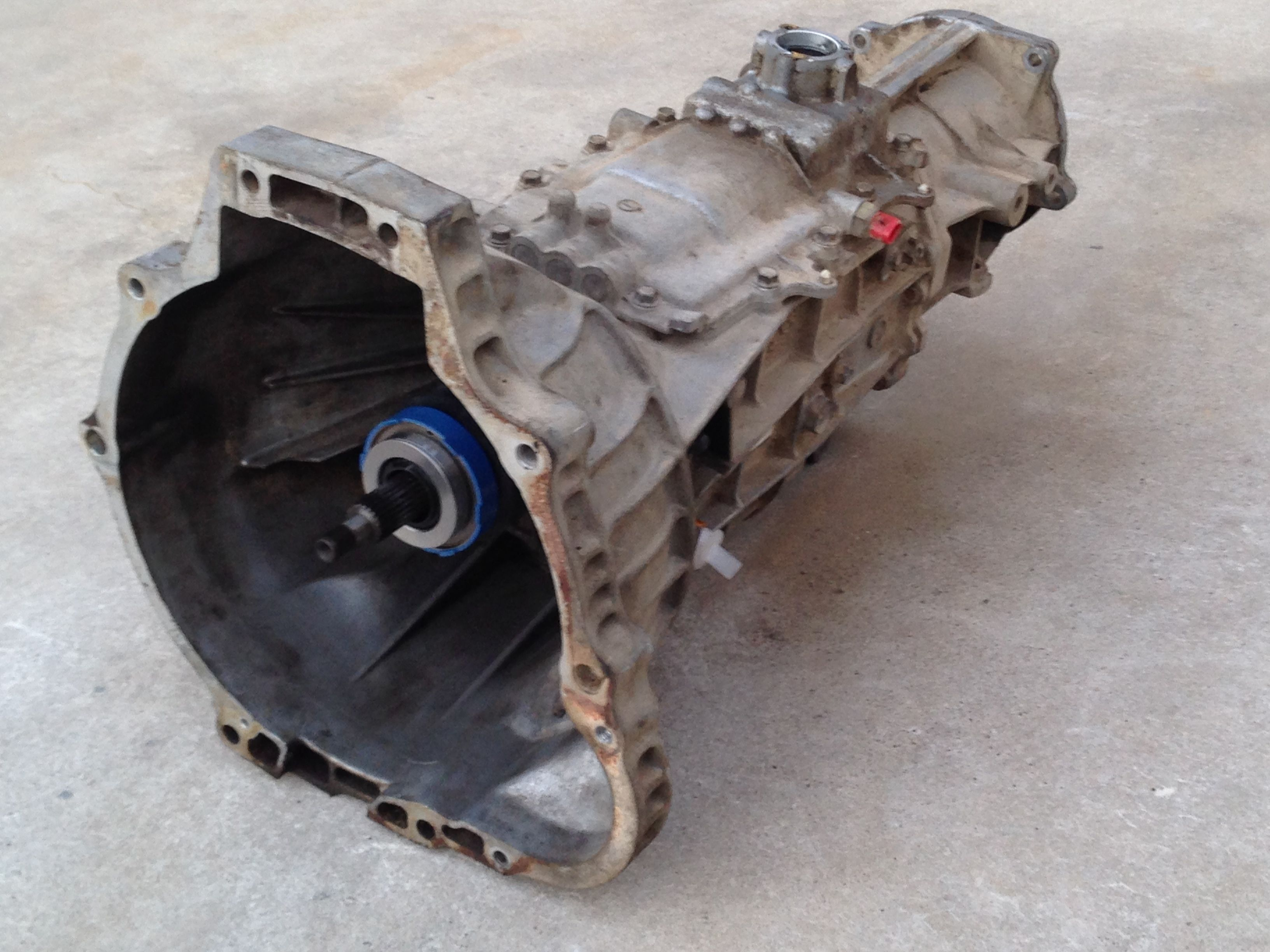
Mazda M5OD manual transmission for a four-wheel-drive vehicle (Ford Ranger) viewed from the engine side

Internals of a Getrag 282 manual transmission for a front-wheel-drive vehicle (Oldsmobile Cutlass)

A manual transmission (MT), also known as a manual gearbox (Note: Standard transmission (in Canada, the United Kingdom and the United States), or stick shift (in Canada and the United States)) is a multi-speed motor vehicle transmission system in which the driver manually selects the gear ratio, typically using a gear stick and clutch. In automobiles, the clutch is typically operated by a foot pedal; motorcycles typically use a hand lever.

Manual transmissions have historically used sliding-mesh and constant-mesh designs. Most modern manual transmissions use constant-mesh gears with synchromesh mechanisms to facilitate gear changes. They commonly provide four to seven forward gear ratios, depending on the vehicle and application.

Manual transmissions are distinguished from automatic transmission, which selects gears without direct driver operation of the transmission. Automated manual transmissions and dual-clutch transmissions use related mechanical principles but automate some or all of the gear-changing process.

== Overview ==
A manual transmission requires the driver to operate the gear stick and clutch in order to change gears (unlike an automatic transmission or semi-automatic transmission, where one (typically the clutch) or both of these functions are automated). Most manual transmissions for cars allow the driver to select any gear ratio at any time, for example shifting from second to fourth gear, or fifth to third gear. However, sequential manual transmissions, which are commonly used in motorcycles and racing cars, only allow the driver to select the next-higher or next-lower gear.

In a vehicle with a manual transmission, the flywheel is attached to the engine's crankshaft, therefore rotating at engine speed. A clutch disc sits between the flywheel and the transmission pressure plate which is attached to the transmission input shaft, controlling whether the transmission is connected to the engine or not. The clutch pedal controls the pressure plate (clutch engaged – the clutch pedal is not being pressed) or not connected to the engine (clutch disengaged – the clutch pedal is being pressed down). When the engine is running and the clutch is engaged (i.e., clutch pedal up), the flywheel spins the clutch pressure plate and hence the transmission.

The design of most manual transmissions for cars is that gear ratios are selected by locking selected gear pairs to the output shaft inside the transmission. This is a fundamental difference compared with a typical hydraulic automatic transmission, which uses an epicyclic (planetary) design, and a hydraulic torque converter. An automatic transmission that allows the driver to control the gear selection (such as shift paddles or "+/−" positions on the gear selector) is called a manumatic transmission, and is not considered a manual transmission. Some automatic transmissions are based on the mechanical build and internal design of a manual transmission but have added components (such as computer-controlled actuators and sensors) which automatically control the timing and speed of the gear shifts and clutch; this design is typically called an automated manual transmission (or sometimes a clutchless manual transmission).

Contemporary manual transmissions for cars typically use five or six forward gears ratios and one reverse gear; however, transmissions with between two and seven gears have been produced at times. Transmissions for trucks and other heavy equipment often have between eight and twenty-five gears, in order to keep the engine speed within the optimal power band for all typical road speeds. Operating such transmissions often uses the same pattern of shifter movement with a single or multiple switches to engage the next sequence of gears.

Manual transmissions in operation

Operation of a constant-mesh 4-speed manual transmission

Non-synchronous "crash" gearbox; with sliding-mesh design, used in older vehicles

Operation of a constant-mesh 4-speed sequential manual transmission, commonly used in motorcycles and race cars

1936 film of automobile gearbox

== History ==
=== 1890s to 1940s ===
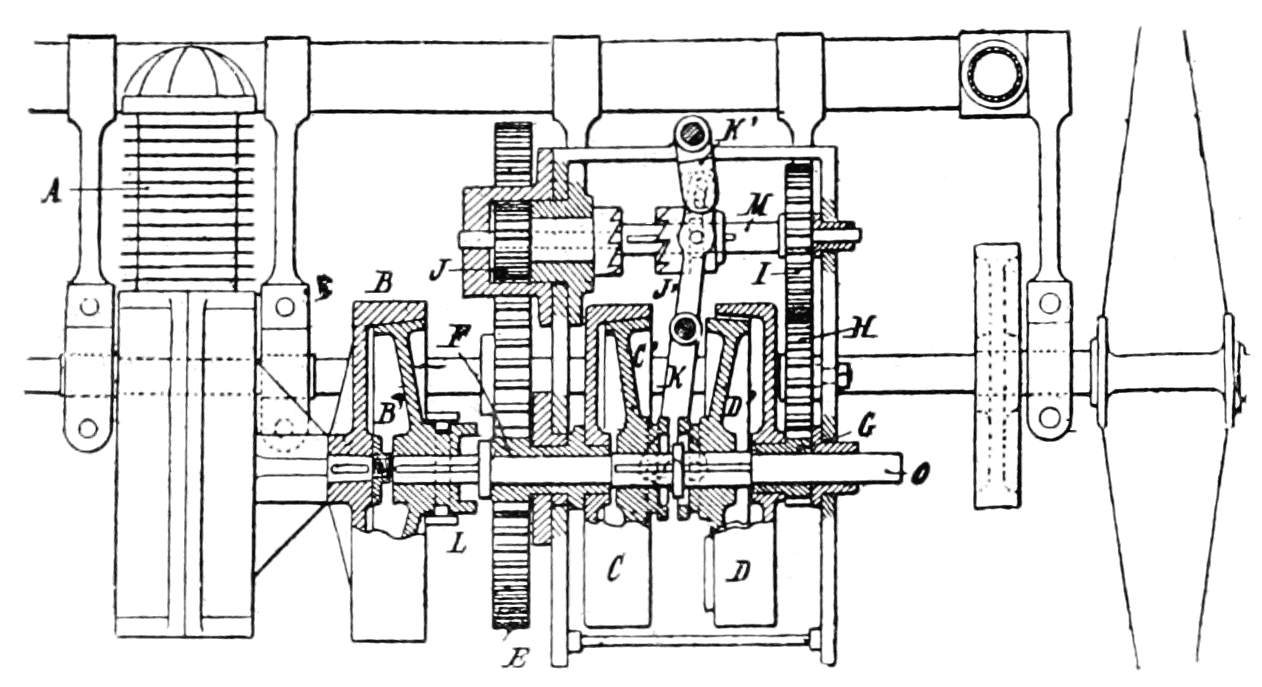
Cherrier two speed gear, c. 1900

Many of the first automobiles were rear-engined, with a simple belt-drive functioning as a single-speed transmission. The 1891 Panhard et Levassor is considered a significant advance in automotive transmissions since it used a three-speed manual transmission. This transmission, along with many similar designs that it inspired, was a non-synchronous (also called sliding-mesh) design where gear changes involved sliding the gears along their shafts so that the desired cogs became meshed. The driver was therefore required to use careful timing and throttle manipulation when shifting, so the gears would be spinning at roughly the same speed when engaged; otherwise, the teeth would refuse to mesh. This was difficult to achieve, so gear changes were often accompanied by grinding or crunching sounds, resulting in the gearboxes being nicknamed "crash boxes". Even after passenger cars had switched to synchronous transmissions (i.e. with synchronizers), many transmissions for heavy trucks, motorcycles and racing cars remained non-synchronous, in order to withstand the forces required or provide a faster shift time.

=== 1950s to 1980s ===
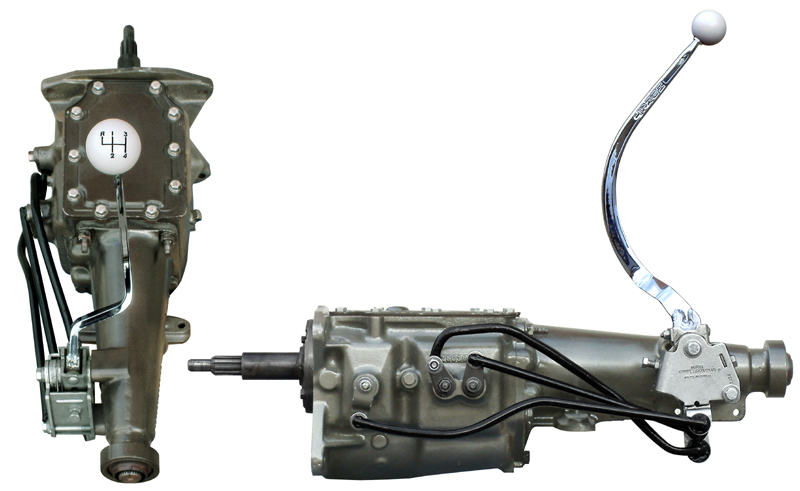
Top and side view of a typical manual transmission, in this case, a Ford Toploader, used in vehicles with external floor shifters

The first car to use a manual transmission with synchromesh was the 1929 Cadillac. Most North American marques had adopted synchronized manual transmissions, usually for second and high gears, by the mid-1930s. In 1947, Porsche patented the split ring synchromesh system. The 1952 Porsche 356 was the first car to use a transmission with synchromesh on all forward gears. In the early 1950s, most cars only had synchromesh for the shift from third gear to second gear (drivers' manuals in vehicles suggested that if the driver needed to shift from second to first, it was best to come to a complete stop beforehand).

Up until the late 1970s, most transmissions had three or four forward gear ratios, although five-speed manual transmissions were occasionally used in sports cars such as the 1948 Ferrari 166 Inter and the 1953 Alfa Romeo 1900 Super Sprint. Five-speed transmissions became widespread during the 1980s, as did the use of synchromesh on all forward gears.

=== 1990s to present ===
Six-speed manual transmissions started to emerge in high-performance vehicles in the early 1990s, such as the 1990 BMW 850i and the 1992 Ferrari 456. The first 6-speed manual transmission was introduced in the 1967 Alfa Romeo 33 Stradale. The first 7-speed manual transmission was introduced in the 2012 Porsche 911 (991).

In 2008, 75.2% of vehicles produced in Western Europe were equipped with manual transmission, versus 16.1% with automatic and 8.7% with other.

== Internals ==
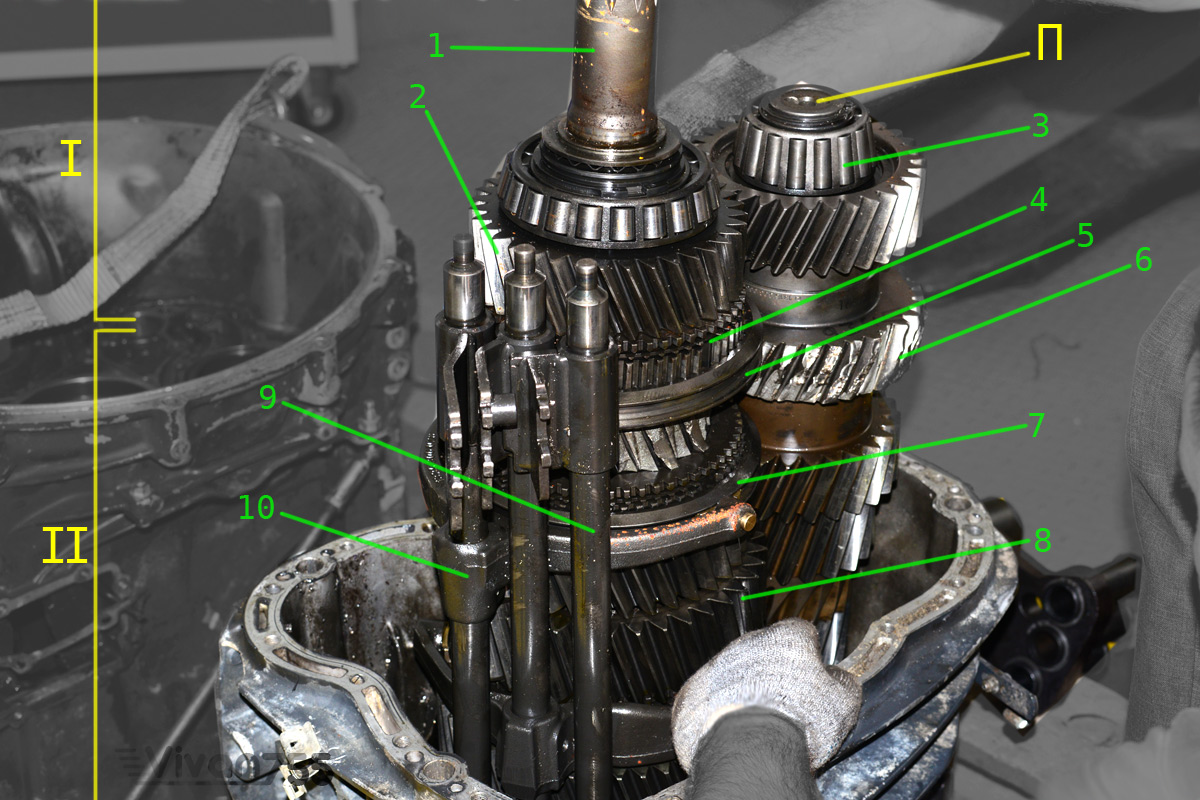
16-speed (2×4×2) ZF 16S181 – opened transmission housing (2×4×2)

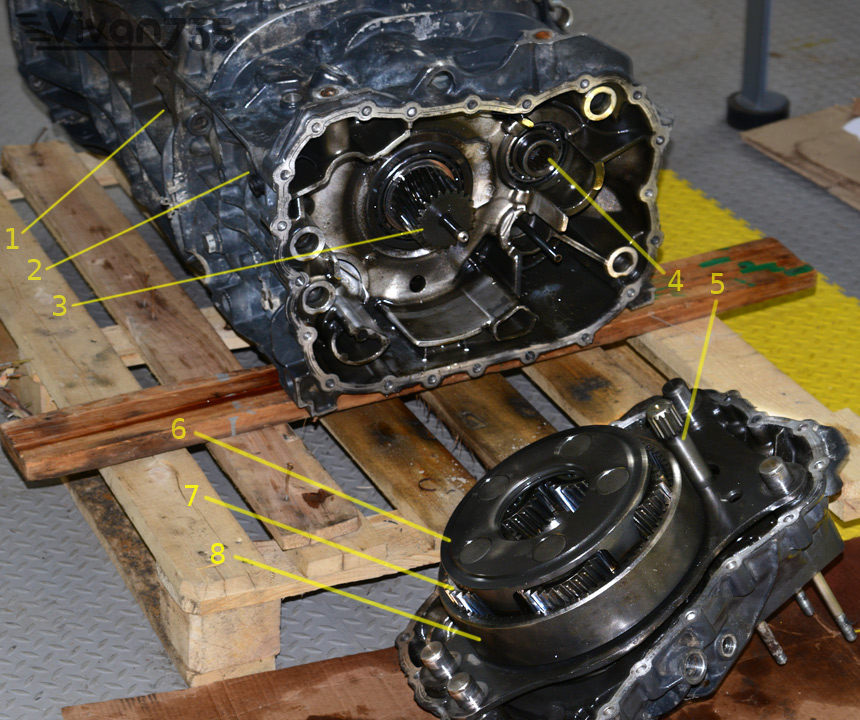
16S181—opened planetary range housing (2×4×2)

=== Shafts ===
A manual transmission has several shafts with various gears and other components attached to them. Most modern passenger cars use 'constant-mesh' transmissions consisting of three shafts: an input shaft, a countershaft (also called a layshaft) and an output shaft.

The input shaft is connected to the engine and spins at engine speed whenever the clutch is engaged. The countershaft has gears of various sizes, which are permanently meshed with the corresponding gear on the input shaft. The gears on the output shaft are also permanently meshed with a corresponding gear on the countershaft; however, the output shaft gears are able to rotate independently of the output shaft itself (through the use of bearings located between the gears and the shaft). Through the use of collars (operated using the shift rods), the speed of the output shaft becomes temporarily locked to the speed of the selected gear. Some transmission designs—such as in the Volvo 850 and S70—have two countershafts, both driving an output pinion meshing with the front-wheel-drive transaxle's ring gear. This allows for a narrower transmission since the length of each countershaft is halved compared with one that contains four gears and two shifters.

The fixed and free gears can be mounted on either the input or output shaft or both. For example, a five-speed transmission might have the first-to-second selectors on the countershaft, but the third-to-fourth selector and the fifth selector on the main shaft. This means that when the vehicle is stopped and idling in neutral with the clutch engaged and the input shaft spinning, the third-, fourth-, and fifth-gear pairs do not rotate.

When neutral is selected, none of the gears on the output shaft are locked to the shaft, allowing the input and output shafts to rotate independently. For reverse gear, an idler gear is used to reverse the direction in which the output shaft rotates. In many transmissions, the input and output shafts can be directly locked together (bypassing the countershaft) to create a 1:1 gear ratio which is referred to as direct-drive.

In a transmission for longitudinal engined vehicles (e.g. most rear-wheel-drive cars), it is common for the input shaft and output shaft to be located on the same axis, since this reduces the torsional forces to which the transmission casing must withstand. The assembly consisting of both the input and output shafts is referred to as the main shaft (although sometimes this term refers to just the input shaft or output shaft). Independent rotation of the input and output shafts is made possible by one shaft being located inside the hollow bore of the other shaft, with a bearing located between the two shafts.

In a transmission for transverse engined vehicles (e.g., front-wheel-drive cars), also called a transaxle, there are usually only two shafts: input and countershaft (sometimes called input and output). The input shaft runs the whole length of the gearbox, and there is no separate input pinion. These transmissions also have an integral differential unit, which is connected via a pinion gear at the end of the counter/output shaft.

Gear selection in a constant-mesh transmission

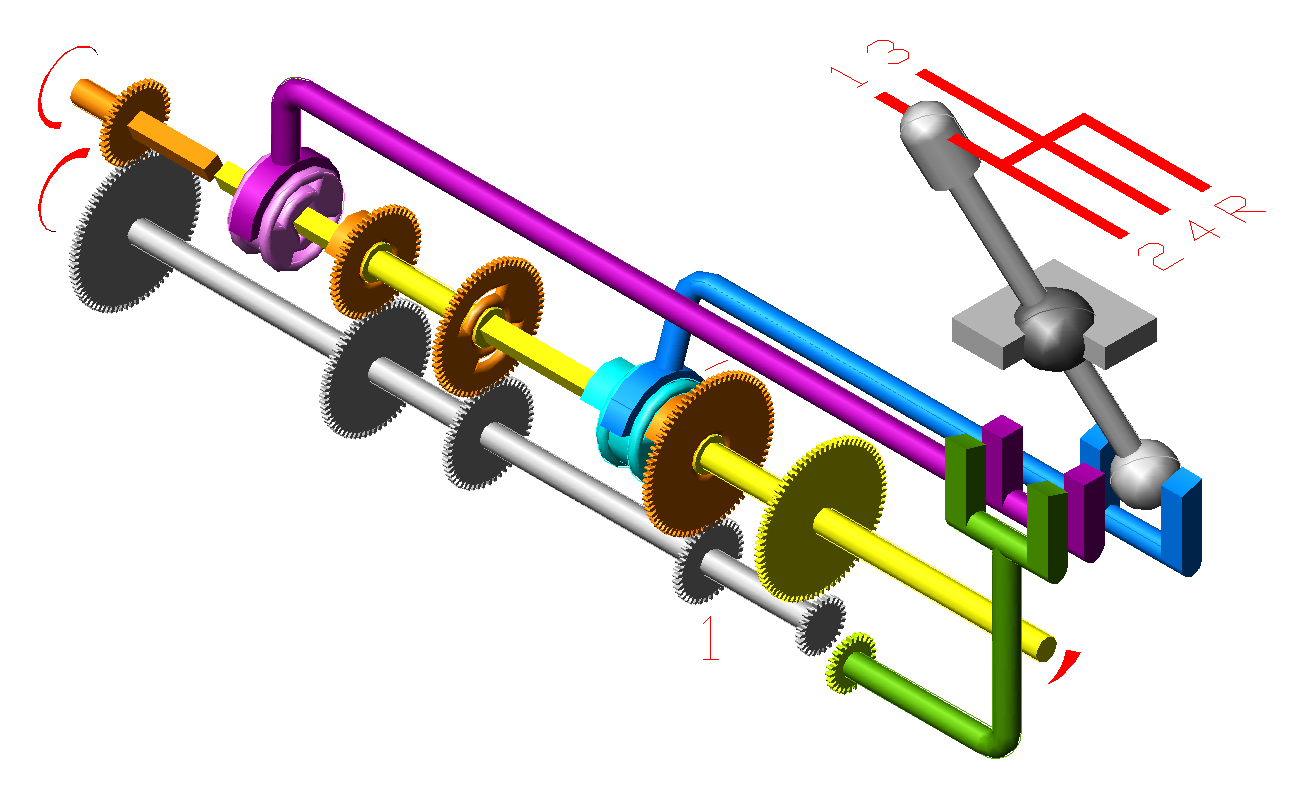
First gear (blue, to back)

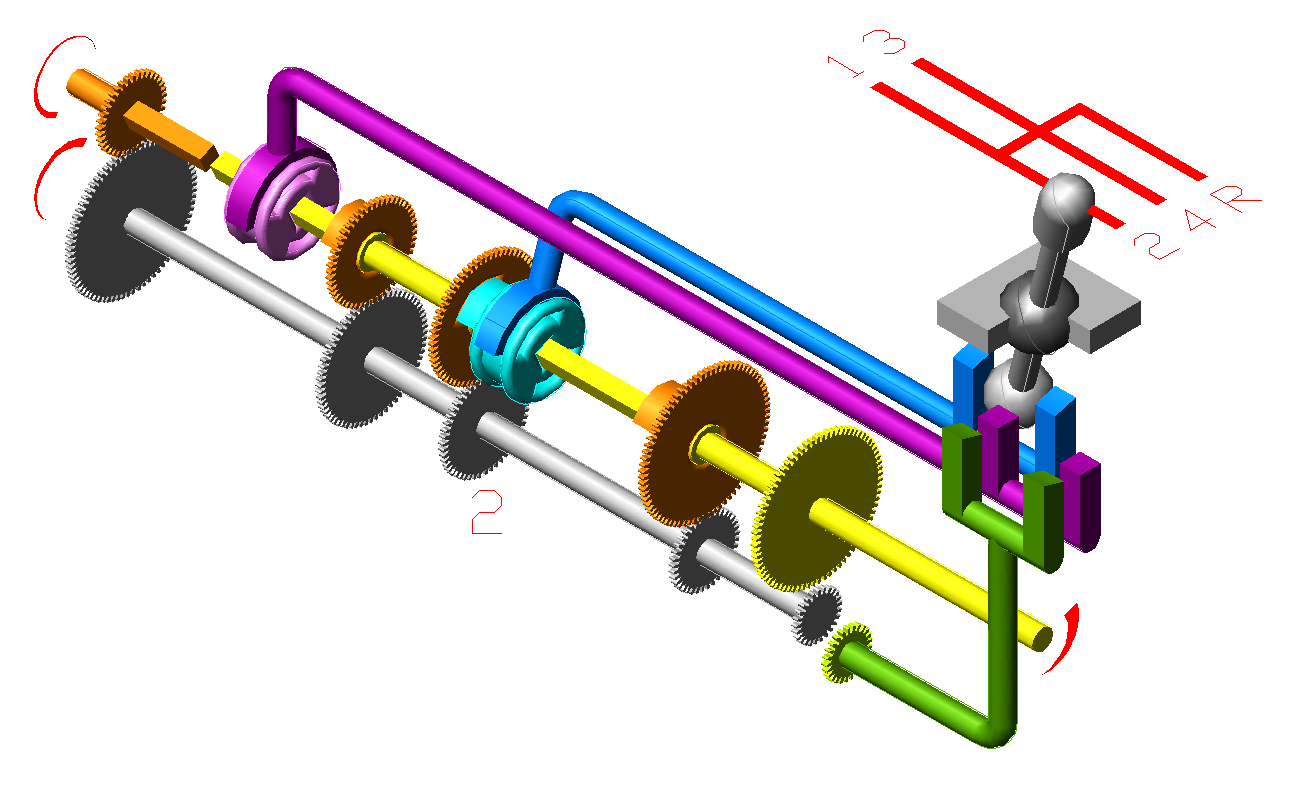
Second gear (blue, to front)

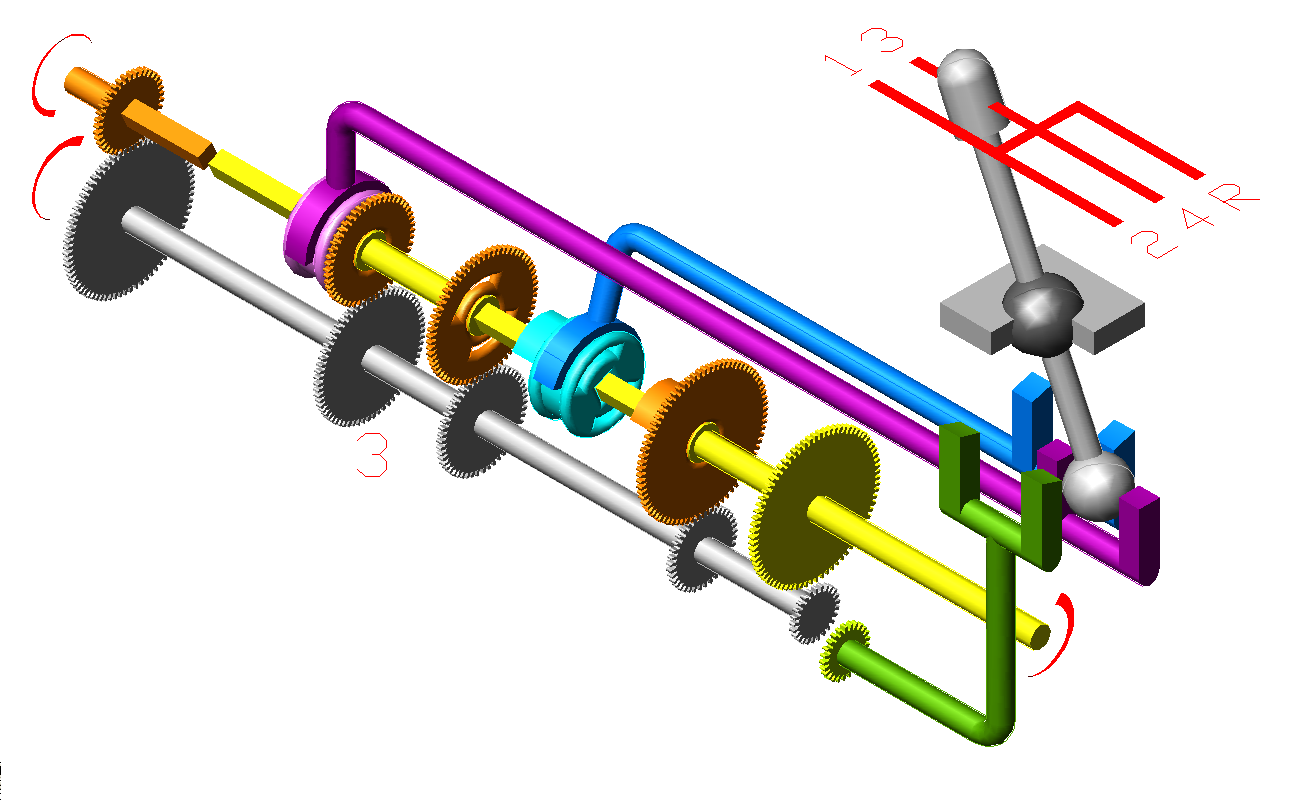
Third gear (purple, to back)

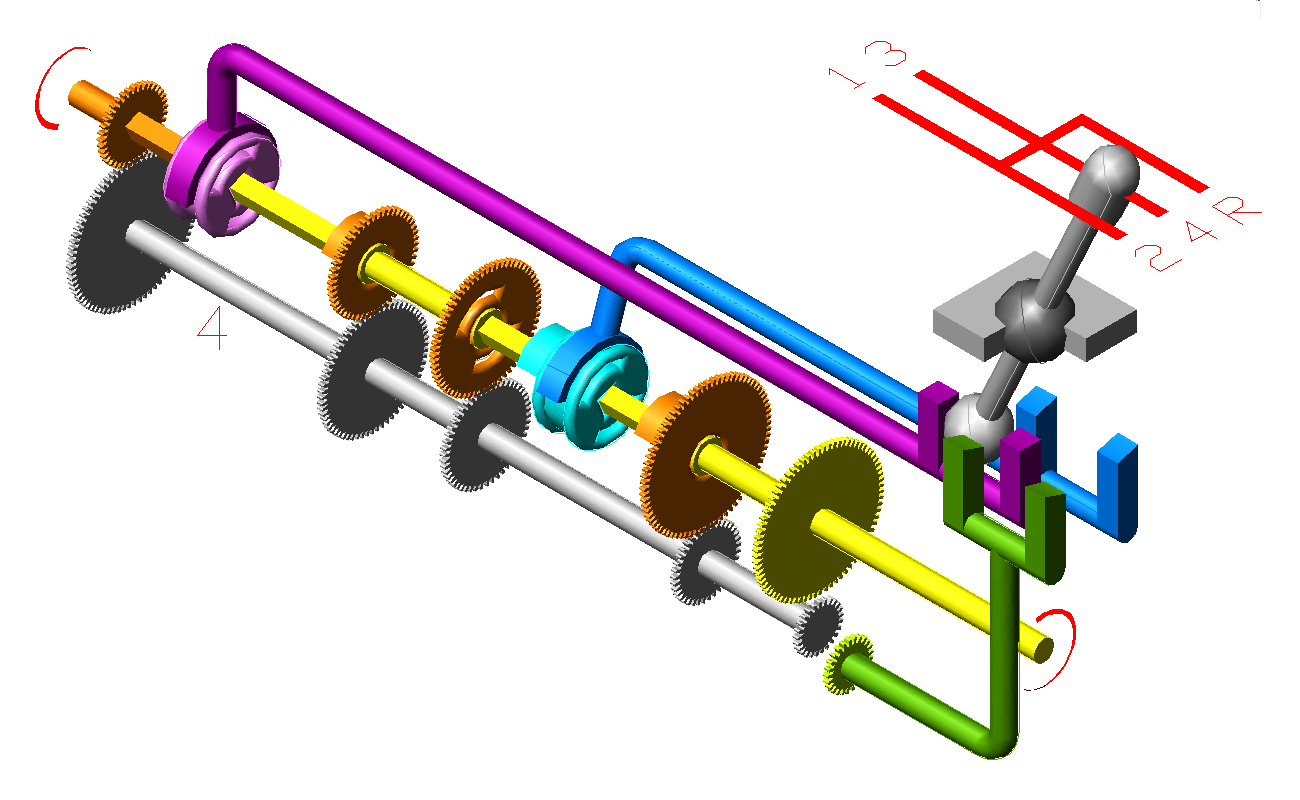
Fourth gear (purple, to front)
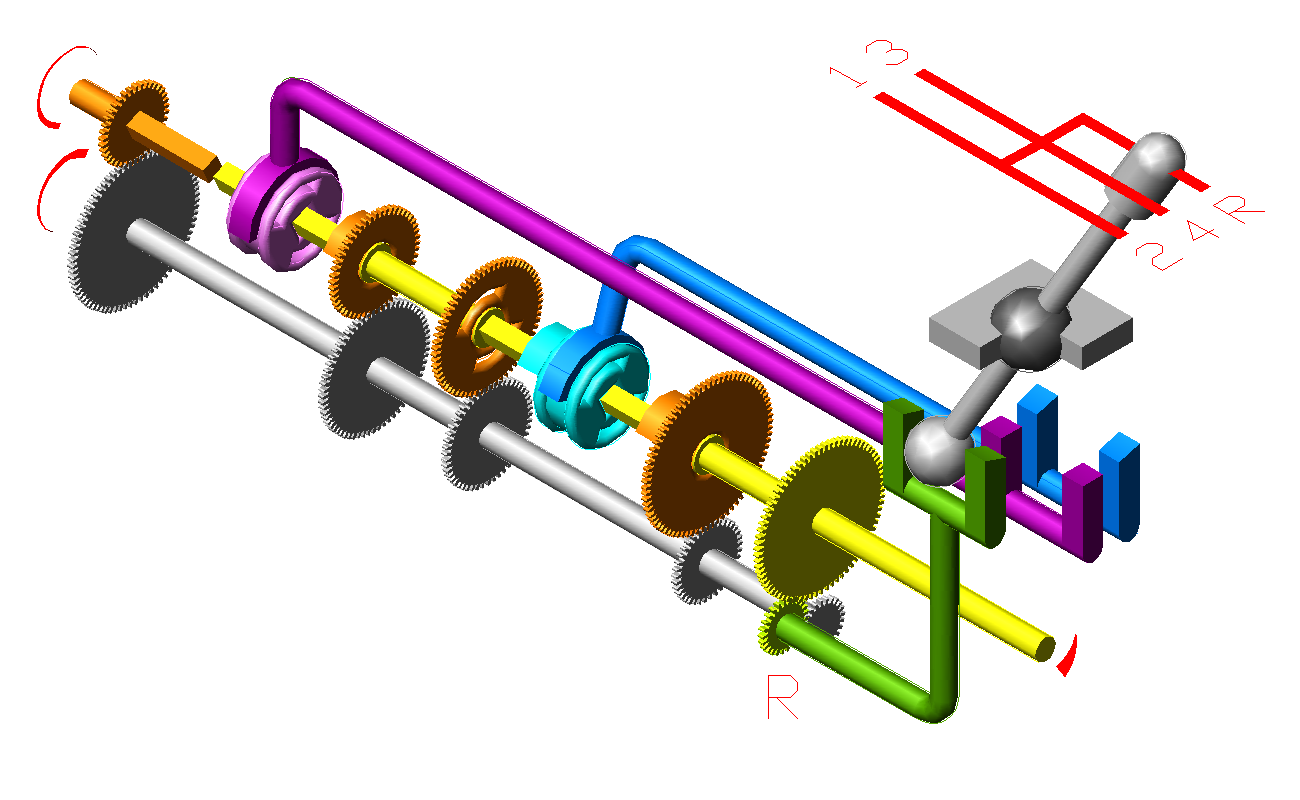
Reverse (green engaged)

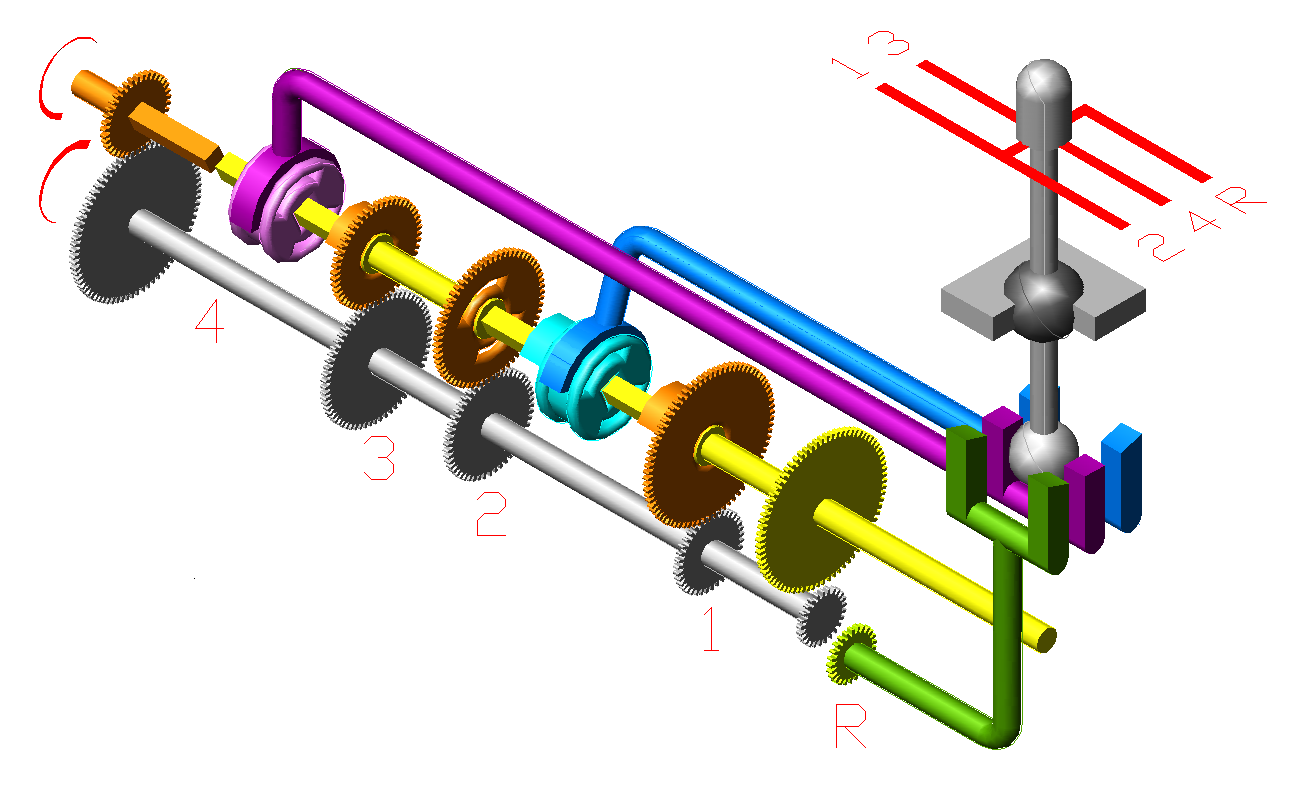
Neutral (all disengaged)

=== Dog clutch ===
In a modern constant-mesh manual transmission, the gear teeth are permanently in contact with each other, and dog clutches (sometimes called dog teeth) are used to select the gear ratio for the transmission. When the dog clutches for all gears are disengaged (i.e. when the transmission is in neutral), all of the gears are able to spin freely around the output shaft. When the driver selects a gear, the dog clutch for that gear is engaged (via the gear selector rods), locking the transmission's output shaft to a particular gear set. This means the output shaft rotates at the same speed as the selected gear, thus determining the gear ratio of the transmission.

The dog clutch is a sliding selector mechanism that sits around the output shaft. It has teeth to fit into the splines on the shaft, forcing that shaft to rotate at the same speed as the gear hub. However, the clutch can move back and forth on the shaft, to either engage or disengage the splines. This movement is controlled by a selector fork that is linked to the gear lever. The fork does not rotate, so it is attached to a collar bearing on the selector. The selector is typically symmetric: it slides between two gears and has a synchromesh and teeth on each side in order to lock either gear to the shaft. Unlike some other types of clutches (such as the foot-operated clutch of a manual-transmission car), a dog clutch provides non-slip coupling and is not suited to intentional slipping.

=== Synchromesh ===
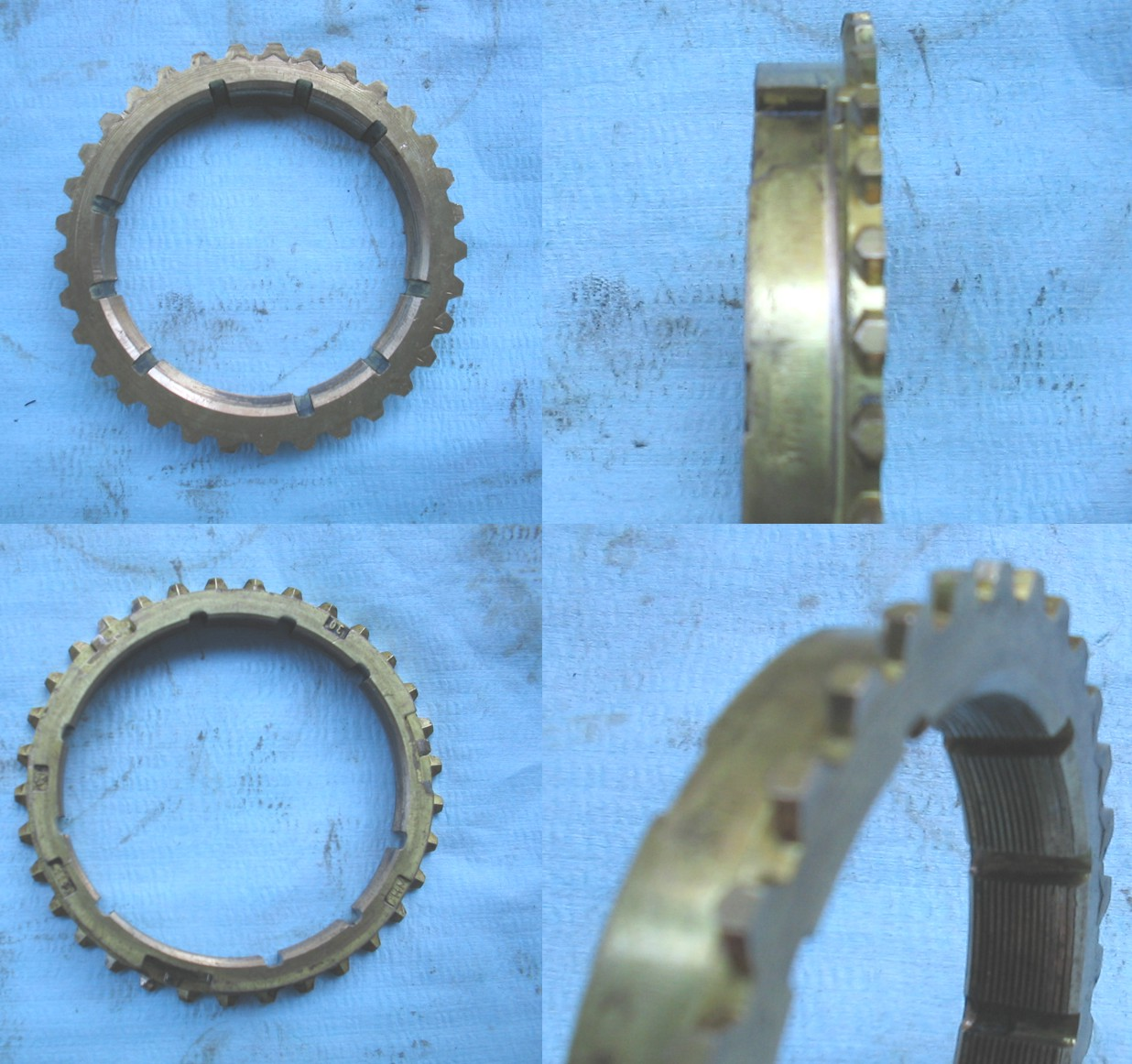
Synchronizer rings

In order to provide smooth gearshifts without requiring the driver to manually match the engine revs for each gearshift, most modern passenger car transmissions use 'synchromesh' (also called 'synchronizer rings') on the forward gears. These devices automatically match the speed of the input shaft with that of the gear being selected, thus removing the need for the driver to use techniques such as double-clutching. The synchromesh transmission was invented in 1919 by Earl Avery Thompson and first used on production cars by Cadillac in 1928.

The need for synchromesh in a constant-mesh transmission is that the dog clutches require the input shaft speed to match that of the gear being selected; otherwise, the dog teeth will fail to engage and a loud grinding sound will be heard as they clatter together. Therefore, to speed up or slow down the input shaft as required, cone-shaped brass synchronizer rings are attached to each gear. When the driver moves the gearshift lever towards the next gear, these synchronizer rings press on the cone-shaped sleeve on the dog collar so that the friction forces can reduce the difference in rotational speeds. Once these speeds are equalized, the dog clutch can engage, and thus the new gear is now in use. In a modern gearbox, the action of all of these components is so smooth and fast it is hardly noticed. Many transmissions do not include synchromesh on the reverse gear.

The synchromesh system must also prevent the collar from bridging the locking rings while the speeds are still being synchronized. This is achieved through 'blocker rings' (also called 'baulk rings'). The synchro ring rotates slightly because of the frictional torque from the cone clutch. In this position, the dog clutch is prevented from engaging. Once the speeds are synchronized, friction on the blocker ring is relieved and the blocker ring twists slightly, bringing into alignment certain grooves or notches that allow the dog clutch to fall into the engagement.

Common metals for synchronizer rings are brass and steel, and are produced either by forging or sheet metal shaping. The latter involves stamping the piece out of a sheet metal strip and then machining to obtain the exact shape required. The rings are sometimes coated with anti-wear linings (also called 'friction linings') made from molybdenum, iron, bronze or carbon (with the latter usually reserved for high-performance transmissions due to their high cost).

Mechanical wear of the synchronizer rings and sleeves can cause the synchromesh system to become ineffective over time. These rings and sleeves have to overcome the momentum of the entire input shaft and clutch disk during each gearshift (and also the momentum and power of the engine, if the driver attempts a gearshift without fully disengaging the clutch). Larger differences in speed between the input shaft and the gear require higher friction forces from the synchromesh components, potentially increasing their wear rate.

=== Reverse gear ===
Even in modern transmissions where all of the forward gears are in a constant-mesh configuration, often the reverse gear uses the older sliding-mesh ("crash box") configuration. This means that moving the gearshift lever into reverse results in gears moving to mesh together. Another unique aspect of the reverse gear is that it consists of two gears—an idler gear on the countershaft and another gear on the output shaft—and both of these are directly fixed to the shaft (i.e. they are always rotating at the same speed as the shaft). These gears are usually spur gears with straight-cut teeth which—unlike the helical teeth used for forward gear—results in a whining sound as the vehicle moves in reverse.

3-speed non-synchronous "crash" gearbox; used in automobiles pre-1950s and semi-trailer trucks

When reverse gear is selected, the idler gear is physically moved to mesh with the corresponding gears on the input and output shafts. To avoid grinding as the gears begin to mesh, they need to be stationary. Since the input shaft is often still spinning due to momentum or dragging of the clutch (even after the car has stopped), a mechanism is needed to stop the input shaft, such as using the synchronizer rings for fifth gear. However, some vehicles do employ a synchromesh system for the reverse gear, thus preventing possible crunching if reverse gear is selected while the input shaft is still spinning.

Most transmissions include a lockout mechanism to prevent reverse gear from being accidentally selected while the car is moving forwards. This can take the form of a collar underneath the gear knob which needs to be lifted or requiring extra force to push the gearshift lever into the plane of reverse gear. There may also be a lockout between fifth and reverse when those two gears are in the same plane of the shift pattern, so that the gearbox must be placed in neutral before changing from fifth to reverse.

=== Non-synchronous transmission ===
Another design of transmission that is used in older cars, trucks, and tractors, is a non-synchronous transmission (also known as a crash gearbox). Non-synchronous transmissions use a sliding-mesh (or constant-mesh, in later years) design and have the nickname "crash" because the difficulty in changing gears can lead to gear shifts accompanied by crashing/crunching noises.

== Clutch ==
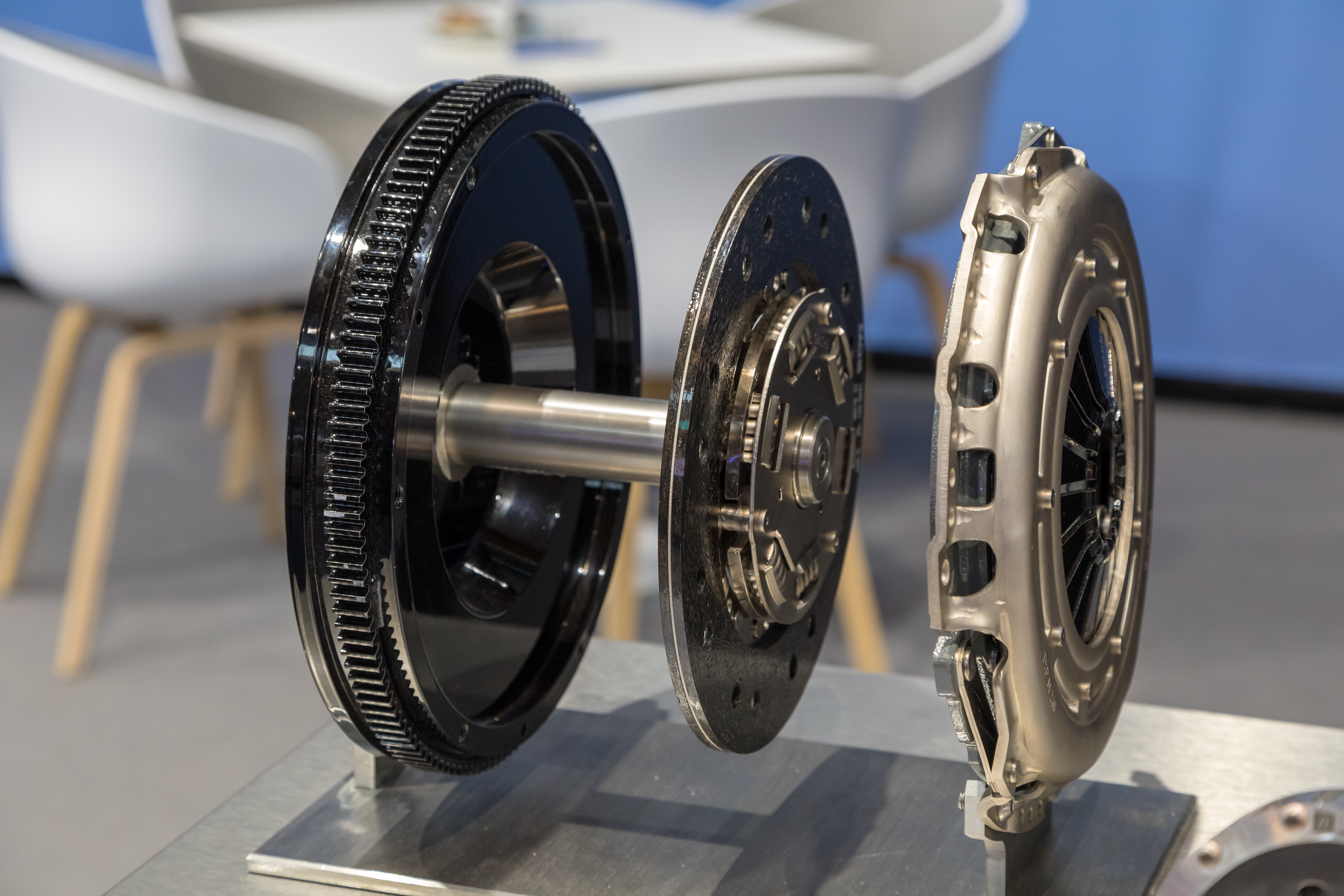
Exploded view of a flywheel, friction disk, and clutch kit

Vehicles with manual transmissions use a clutch to manage the linkage between the engine and the transmission, and decouple the transmission from the engine during gearshifts and when the vehicle is stationary. Without a clutch, the engine would stall any time the vehicle stopped, and changing gears would be difficult (deselecting a gear requires the driver to adjust the throttle so that the transmission is not under load, and selecting a gear requires the engine RPM to be at the exact speed that matches the road speed for the gear being selected).

Most motor vehicles use a pedal to operate the clutch; except for motorcycles, which usually have a clutch lever on the left handlebar.

== Gear shift types ==
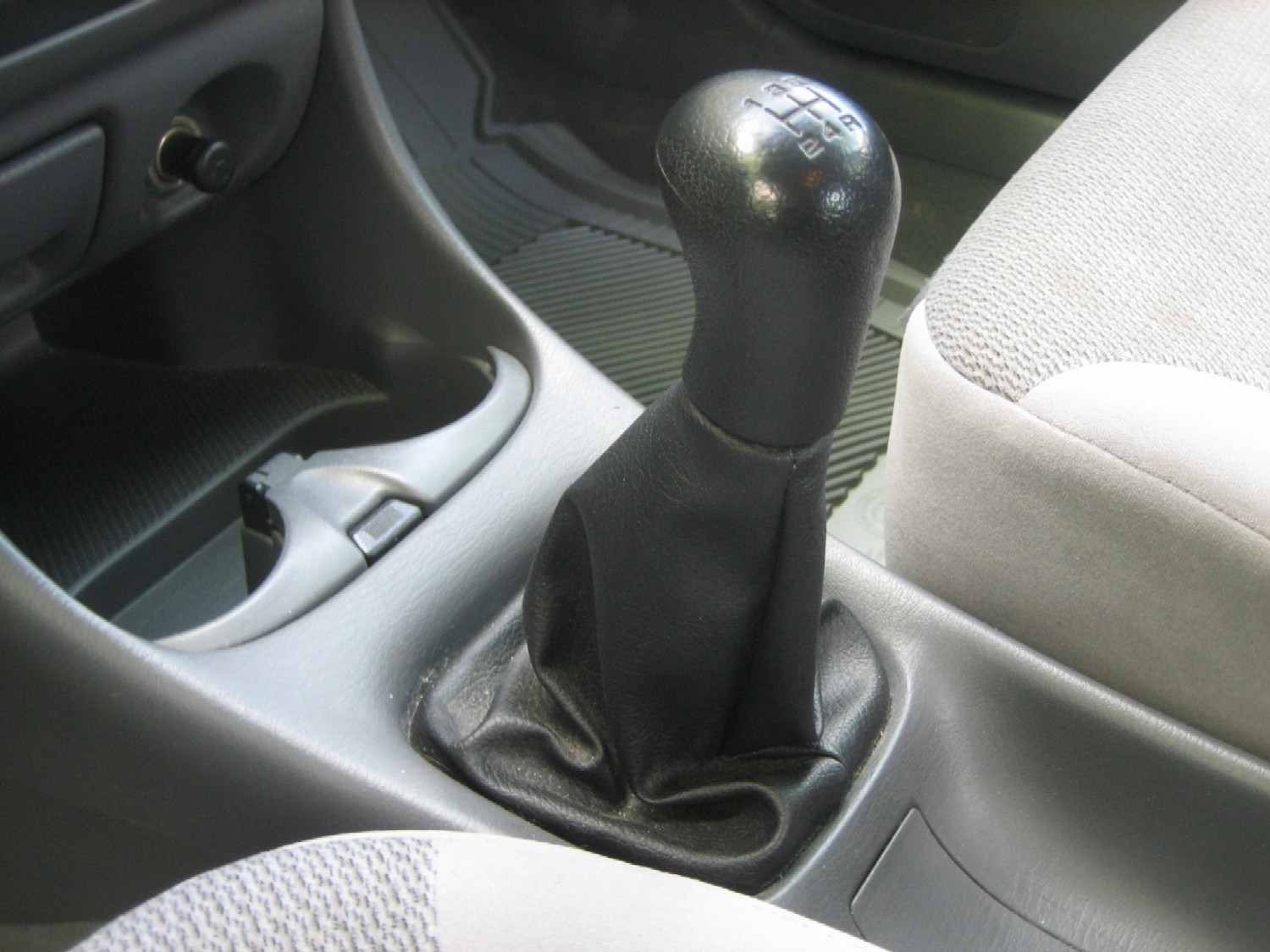
Floor-mounted gear stick in a Mazda Protege passenger car

Common shift pattern for a 5-speed transmission

In most vehicles with a manual transmission, the driver selects gears by manipulating a lever called a gear stick (also called a gearshift, gear lever or shifter). In most automobiles, the gear stick is located on the floor between the driver and front passenger, but some cars have a gear stick that is mounted to the steering column or center console.

The movement of the gear stick is transferred (via solid linkages or cables) to the selector forks within the transmission.

Motorcycles typically employ sequential manual transmissions, although the shift pattern is modified slightly for safety reasons. Gear selection is usually via the left-foot (or, on older motorcycles, right-foot) shift lever with a layout of 1–N–2–3–4–5–6.

=== "Three on the tree" vs. "four on the floor" ===
During the period when U.S. vehicles usually had only three forward speeds, the most common gear-shifter location was on the steering column, a layout that was sometimes called "three on the tree". By contrast, high-performance cars, and European vehicles in general, mostly used a four-speed transmission with floor-mounted shifters. That layout was referred to as "four on the floor".

Most FR (front-engined, rear-wheel drive) vehicles have a transmission that sits between the driver and the front passenger seat. Floor-mounted shifters are often connected directly to the transmission. FF (front-engined, front-wheel drive) vehicles, RR (rear-engined, rear-wheel drive) vehicles and front-engined vehicles with rear-mounted gearboxes often require a mechanical linkage to connect the shifter to the transmission.

=== Column-mounted shifter ===
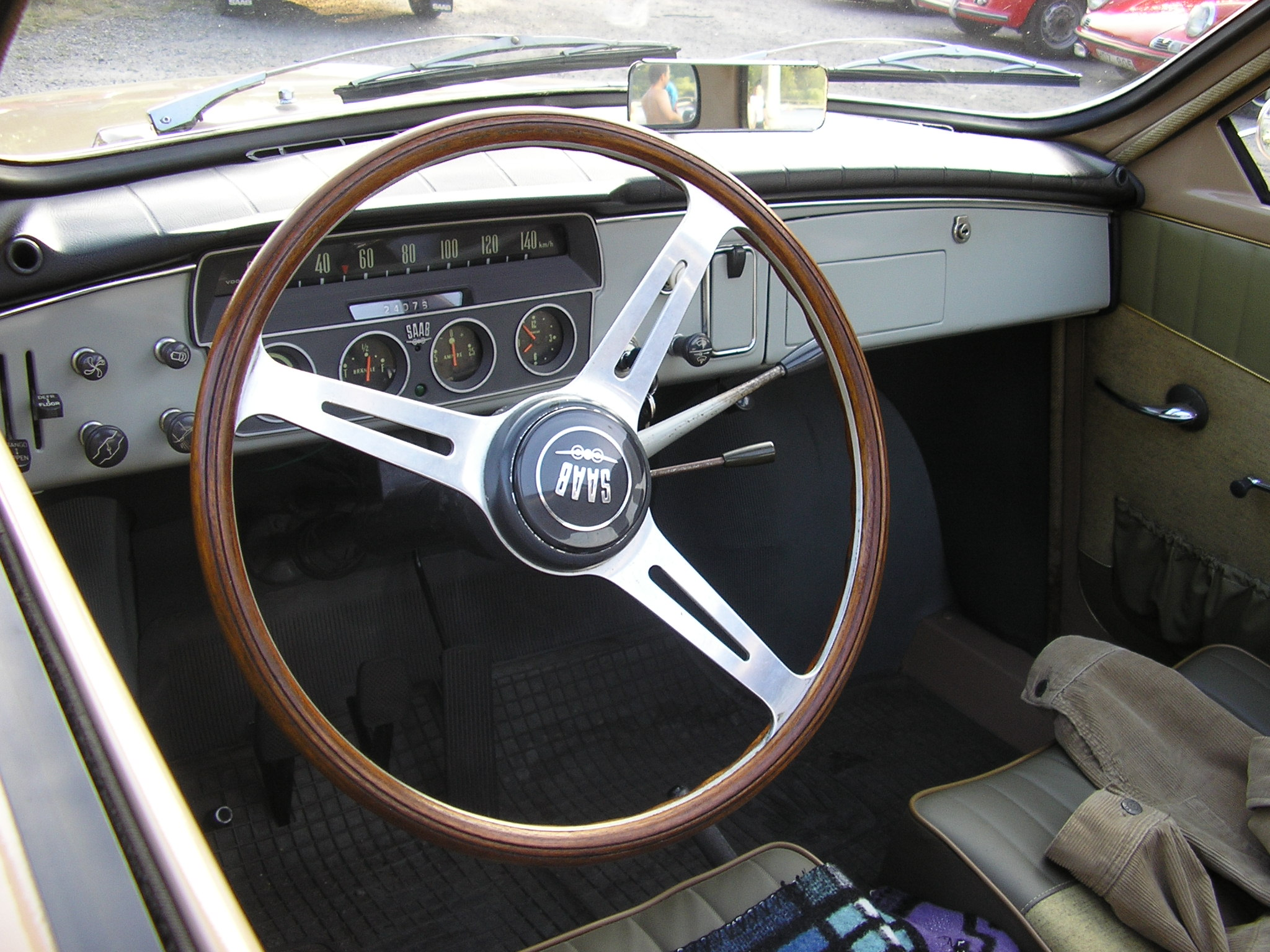
Column-mounted gear shift lever in a Saab 96

Some vehicles have a gear lever mounted on the steering column. A 3-speed column shifter, which came to be popularly known as a "three on the tree", began appearing in America in the late 1930s and became common during the 1940s and 1950s. If a U.S. vehicle was equipped with overdrive, it was very likely to be a Borg-Warner type, operated by briefly backing off the accelerator pedal when above 28 mph (45 km/h) to enable, and momentarily flooring the same pedal to return to normal gear. The control simply disables overdrive for such situations as parking on a hill or preventing unwanted shifting into overdrive.

Later, European and Japanese models began to have 4-speed column shifters with this shift pattern:

A majority of North American-spec vehicles sold in the U.S. and Canada had a 3-speed column-mounted shifter—the first generation Chevrolet/GMC vans of 1964–70 vintage had an ultra-rare 4-speed column shifter. The column-mounted manual shifter disappeared in North America by the mid-1980s, last appearing in the 1987 Chevrolet pickup truck. Prior to 1980, the GM X platform compacts (Chevrolet Nova and its rebadged corporate clones) were the final passenger cars to have a column-mounted manual shifter. Outside North America, the column-mounted shifter remained in production. All Toyota Crown and Nissan Cedric taxis in Hong Kong had the 4-speed column shift until 1999 when automatic transmissions were first offered. Since the late 1980s or early 1990s, a 5-speed column shifter has been offered in some vans sold in Asia and Europe, such as Toyota Hiace, Mitsubishi L400 and the first-gen Fiat Ducato. Many European cars had manual column shifts and the Renault 16TX had a 5-speed.

Column shifters are mechanically similar to floor shifters, although shifting occurs in a vertical plane instead of a horizontal one. Because the shifter is further away from the transmission, and the movements at the shifter and at the transmission are in different planes, column shifters require more complicated linkage than floor shifters. Advantages of a column shifter are the ability to switch between the two most commonly used gears—second and third—without letting go of the steering wheel, and the lack of interference with passenger seating space in vehicles equipped with a bench seat.

=== Console-mounted shifter ===
Some smaller cars in the 1950s and 1960s, such as Citroën 2CV, Renault 4 and early Renault 5 feature a shifter in the dash panel. This was cheaper to manufacture than a column shifter and more practical, as the gearbox was mounted in front of the engine. The linkage for the shifter could then be positioned on top of the engine. The disadvantage is that shifting is less comfortable and usually slower to operate.

Newer small cars and MPVs, like the Suzuki MR Wagon, the Fiat Multipla, the Toyota Matrix, the Pontiac Vibe, the Chrysler RT platform cars, the Honda Element, the Honda Civic, the Daihatsu Sigra, and the Honda Avancier, may feature a manual or automatic transmission gear shifter located on the vehicle's instrument panel, similar to the mid-1950s Chryslers and Powerglide Corvairs. Console-mounted shifters are similar to floor-mounted gear shifters in that most of the ones used in modern vehicles operate on a horizontal plane and can be mounted to the vehicle's transmission in much the same way a floor-mounted shifter can. However, because of the location of the gear shifter in comparison to the locations of the column shifter and the floor shifter, as well as the positioning of the shifter to the rest of the controls on the panel often require that the gearshift be mounted in a space that does not feature a lot of controls integral to the vehicle's operation, or frequently used controls, such as those for the stereo system or HVAC system, to help prevent accidental activation or driver confusion.

More and more small cars and vans from manufacturers such as Suzuki, Honda, and Volkswagen are featuring console shifters in that they free up space on the floor for other features such as storage compartments without requiring that the gear shift be mounted on the steering column. Also, the basic location of the gear shift in comparison to the column shifter makes console shifters easier to operate than column shifters.

== External overdrive ==
In the 1950s, 1960s, and 1970s, fuel-efficient highway cruising with low engine speed was in some cases enabled on vehicles equipped with 3- or 4-speed transmissions by means of a separate overdrive unit in or behind the rear housing of the transmission. This was actuated either manually while in high gear by throwing a switch or pressing a button on the gearshift knob or on the steering column, or automatically by momentarily lifting the foot from the accelerator with the vehicle traveling above a certain road speed. Automatic overdrives were disengaged by flooring the accelerator, and a lockout control was provided to enable the driver to disable overdrive and operate the transmission as a normal (non-overdrive) transmission.

The term 'overdrive' is also used to describe a gear with a ratio of less than one (e.g., if the top gear of the transmission has a ratio of 0.8:1).

== Push starting ==
Vehicles with a manual transmission can often be push started when the starter motor is not operational, such as when the car has a dead battery or when the starter motor itself has malfunctioned and is unable to deliver sufficient rotational energy to turn the engine over.

When push-starting, the rotation of the wheels rolling on the road is transferred to the driveshaft, the transmission, and the crankshaft. This simulates what the starter is intended for and operates in a similar way to crank handles on very old cars from the early 20th century, with the cranking motion being replaced by the pushing of the car.

== Driving techniques ==
Recently, many automatic transmissions have included more gear ratios than their manual counterparts.

In some countries, a driving license issued for vehicles with an automatic transmission is not valid for driving vehicles with a manual transmission, but a license for manual transmissions covers both.

=== Hill starts ===
Starting from a stationary position in a manual transmission vehicle requires extra torque to accelerate the vehicle up the hill, with the potential for the vehicle to roll backward in the time it takes to move the driver's foot from the brake pedal to the accelerator pedal (to increase the engine RPM before engaging the clutch). A traditional method of hill starts in a manual transmission car is to use the parking brake (also called "handbrake", "emergency brake", or "e-brake") to hold the vehicle stationary. This means that the driver's right foot is not needed to operate the brake pedal, freeing it up to be used on the accelerator pedal instead. Once the required engine RPM is obtained, the driver can engage the clutch, also releasing the parking brake as the clutch engages.

A device called the hill-holder was introduced on the 1936 Studebaker. Many modern vehicles use an electronically actuated parking brake, which often includes a hill-holder feature whereby the parking brake is automatically released as the driven wheels start to receive power from the engine.

In many light-duty vehicles, skilled drivers can slip the clutch just barely enough to hold the vehicle from much rollback during the second while the right foot is moving from the brake pedal to the accelerator pedal; this method effectively solves the hill-holding problem without any parking brake use and with negligible clutch life reduction, although it requires some skill.

On vehicles with a hand throttle such as agricultural tractors, it is possible to avoid rollback by increasing engine RPM using the hand throttle, then releasing the brake and clutch pedals in the usual fashion.

=== Other driving techniques ===
- Rev-matching is where the driver uses the throttle to match the revs to the road speed so that gear changes are not jerky. This is commonly used by drivers with non-synchromesh gearboxes, or those driving racing vehicles
- Double-clutching is required on non-synchro gearboxes. To double-clutch while downshifting: depress the clutch pedal and move the gear lever to neutral, release the clutch pedal, "blip" the throttle to speed up the layshaft to increase the rotational speed of the lower gear, depress the clutch pedal again, move the gear lever to the lower gear, then release the clutch pedal.
- Heel-and-toe shifting is where the driver uses one foot to modulate the brake and accelerator pedal simultaneously to allow for rev matching under braking.
- Rowing, block shifting or skip shifting is the technique of downshifting more than one gear in order to reduce wear and tear on the gearbox. Rev-matching may need to be used to create a smooth shift. Combining this with heel-and-toe downshifting provides for maximum braking when going from top gear to a much lower gear, and optimal engine RPM for exiting the corner.

== Synchronized downshift rev-matching system ==
The synchronized down shift rev-matching system is a computer-controlled technology that mimics the manual rev-matching technique.

== Truck transmissions ==
Some trucks have transmissions that look and behave like ordinary consumer vehicle transmissions, operated by a single lever. These transmissions are used on lighter trucks, typically have up to 6 gears, and usually have synchromesh.

For trucks needing more gears, the standard "H" pattern can be complicated for some truck drivers, so additional controls are used to select additional gears. The "H" pattern is retained, then an additional control selects among alternatives. In older trucks, the control is often a separate lever mounted on the floor or more recently a pneumatic switch mounted on the "H" lever; in newer trucks, the control is often an electrical switch mounted on the "H" lever. Multi-control transmissions are built in much higher power ratings but rarely use synchromesh.

There are several common alternatives for the shifting pattern. The standard types are:

- Range transmissions use an "H" pattern through a narrow range of gears, then a "range" control shifts the "H" pattern between high and low ranges. For example, an 8-speed range transmission has an H shift pattern with four gears. The first through fourth gears are accessed when a low range is selected. To access the fifth through eighth gears, the range selector is moved to high range, and the gear lever again shifted through the first through fourth gear positions. In high range, the first gear position becomes fifth, the second gear position becomes sixth, and so on.
- Splitter transmissions use an "H" pattern with a wide range of gears, and the other selector splits each sequential gear position in two: First gear is in the first position/low split, second gear is in the first position/high split, third gear is in second position/low split, fourth gear is in second position/high split, and so on.
- Range-splitter transmissions combine range-splitting and gear-splitting. This allows even more gear ratios. Both a range selector and a splitter selector are provided.

Although there are many gear positions, shifting through gears usually follows a regular pattern. For example, a series of upshifts might use "move to splitter direct; move to splitter overdrive; move the shift lever to No. 2 and move splitter to underdrive; move splitter to direct; move splitter to overdrive; move the shifter to No. 3 and move splitter to underdrive"; and so on. In older trucks using floor-mounted levers, a bigger problem is common gearshifts require the drivers to move their hands between shift levers in a single shift, and without synchromesh, shifts must be carefully timed or the transmission will not engage. For this reason, some splitter transmissions have an additional "under under" range, so when the splitter is already in "under" it can be quickly downshifted again, without the delay of a double shift.

Modern truck transmissions are most commonly "range-splitter". The most common 13-speed has a standard H pattern, and the pattern from the left upper corner is as follows: R, down to L, over and up to 1, down to 2, up and over to 3, down to 4. The "butterfly" range lever in the center front of the knob is flipped up to high range while in fourth, then shifted back to 1. The 1 through 4 positions of the knob is repeated. Also, each can be split using the thumb-actuated under-overdrive lever on the left side of the knob while in high range. The "thumb" lever is not available in low range, except in 18 speeds; 1 through 4 in the low range can be split using the thumb lever and L can be split with the "Butterfly" lever. L cannot be split using the thumb lever in either the 13- or 18-speed. The 9-speed transmission is like a 13-speed without the under-overdrive thumb lever.

Truck transmissions use many physical layouts. For example, the output of an N-speed transmission may drive an M-speed secondary transmission, giving a total of N*M gear combinations. Transmissions may be in separate cases with a shaft in between; in separate cases bolted together; or all in one case, using the same lubricating oil. The second transmission is often called a "Brownie" or "Brownie box" after a popular brand. With a third transmission, gears are multiplied yet again, giving greater range or closer spacing. Some trucks thus have dozens of gear positions, although most are duplicates. Sometimes a secondary transmission is integrated with the differential in the rear axle, called a "two-speed rear end". Two-speed differentials are always splitters. In newer transmissions, there may be two counter shafts, so each main shaft gear can be driven from one or the other countershaft; this allows construction with short and robust countershafts, while still allowing many gear combinations inside a single gear case.

Heavy-duty transmissions are mostly non-synchromesh. Sometimes synchromesh adds weight that could be payload, and is one more thing to fail, and drivers spend thousands of hours driving so can take the time to learn to drive efficiently with a non-synchromesh transmission. Float shifting (also called "floating gears") is changing gears without disengaging the clutch, usually on a non-synchronized transmission used by large trucks. Since the clutch is not used, it is easy to mismatch speeds of gears, and the driver can quickly cause major (and expensive) damage to the gears and the transmission.

Heavy trucks are usually powered with diesel engines. Diesel truck engines from the 1970s and earlier tend to have a narrow power band, so they need many close-spaced gears. Starting with the 1968 Maxidyne, diesel truck engines have increasingly used turbochargers and electronic controls that widen the power band, allowing fewer and fewer gear ratios. As of 2021, fleet operators often use 9, 10, 13, or 18-speed transmissions, but automated manual transmissions are becoming more common on heavy vehicles, as they can improve efficiency and drivability, reduce the barrier to entry for new drivers, and may improve safety by allowing the driver to concentrate on road conditions.

== Lubrication ==
Manual transmissions are lubricated with gear oil (or engine oil in some vehicles) which must be changed periodically in some vehicles, although not as frequently as the fluid in an automatic transmission. Gear oil has a characteristic aroma because it contains added sulfur-bearing anti-wear compounds. These compounds are used to reduce the high sliding friction by the helical gear cut of the teeth (this cut eliminates the characteristic whine of straight-cut spur gears). On motorcycles with "wet" clutches (clutch is bathed in engine oil), there is usually nothing separating the lower part of the engine from the transmission, so the same oil lubricates both the engine and transmission.

== See also ==
- Automatic transmission
- Diesel–electric transmission
- Freewheel
- Gear train
- Non-synchronous transmission
- Overdrive (mechanics)
- Preselector gearbox
- Torque converter
- Transmission (mechanical device)
