= Dog clutch =

Type of clutch

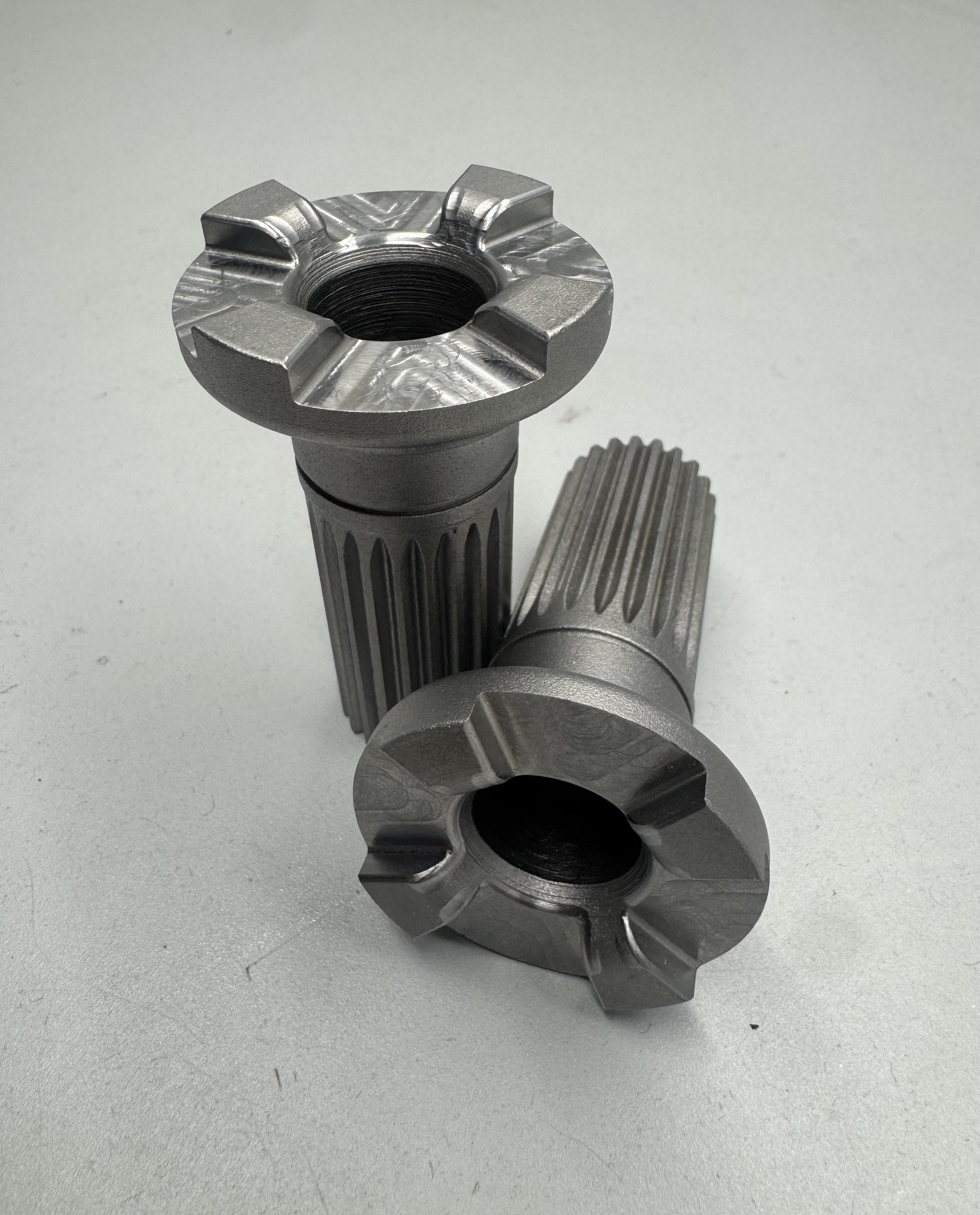
Dog clutch used to engage or disengage the four wheel drive system on a vehicle in the Baja SAE collegiate design competition.

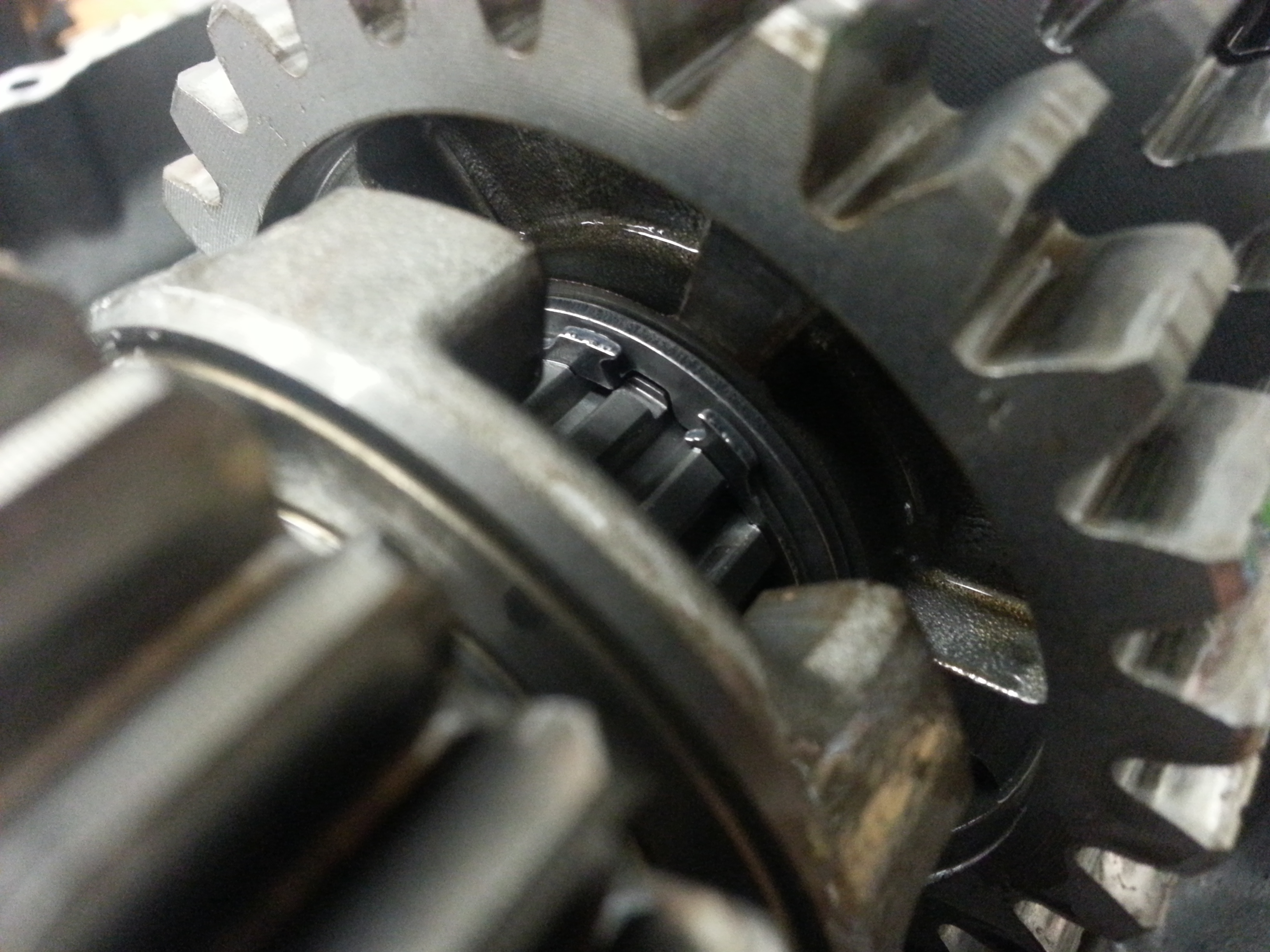
Dog clutch (disengaged) on the countershaft gears of the Honda CBR600RR transmission.

A dog clutch (also known as a dog ring, clutch dog, dog gear, or positive clutch) is a type of clutch that couples two rotating shafts or other rotating components by engagement of interlocking teeth or dogs rather than by friction. The two parts of the clutch are designed such that one will push the other, causing both to rotate at the same speed and will never slip. In engineering, a "dog" is a tool or device used to lock two components in relation to each other.

Dog clutches are used inside constant-mesh manual transmissions to lock different gears to the rotating input and output shafts. A synchromesh arrangement ensures smooth engagement by matching the shaft speeds before the dog clutch is allowed to engage. Racecar, motorcycle, and large truck transmissions, having higher performance demands and less need for smooth engagement than passenger cars, commonly employ dog clutches unsynchronized to engage gears due to their high strength and durability and low complexity and weight. These unsynchronized gearboxes are nicknamed dog boxes and allow clutchless shifting.

Dog clutches are employed where slip is undesirable and/or the clutch is not used to control torque. Without slippage, dog clutches are not affected by wear in the same way that friction clutches are, but result in shock when shafts of different speeds are engaged. For this reason they are best used when sudden starting action is acceptable and the inertia of the system is small.

Oftentimes boats with inboard engines, such as sailboats, will use a dog clutch to engage the drive shaft to the transmission. Shifting from neutral to forward or reverse often results in a large "clunk" noise that can be heard by occupants as the clutch engages suddenly.

Another example of a dog clutch is in the Sturmey-Archer bicycle hub gear, where a sliding cross-shaped clutch locks the driver assembly to different parts of the planetary geartrain.
