= Non-synchronous transmission =

Form of manual transmission

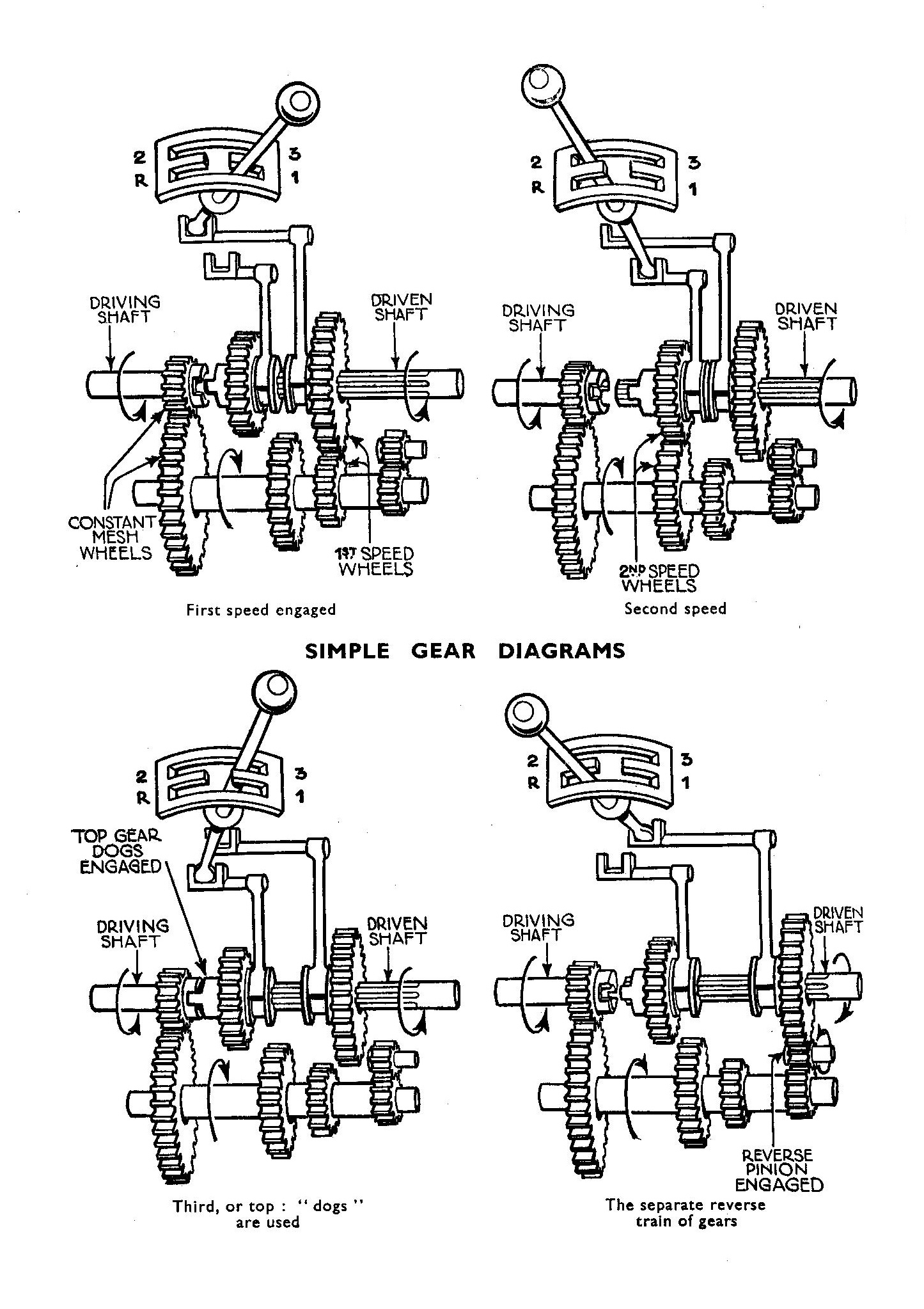
Three-speed sliding-gear non-synchronous transmission

Non-synchronous "crash" gearbox; commonly used today in semi-trucks and tractors, and formerly used in automobiles pre-1950s

A non-synchronous transmission, also called a crash gearbox, is a form of manual transmission based on gears that do not use synchronizing mechanisms. They require the driver to manually synchronize the transmission's input speed (engine speed) and output speed (driveshaft speed).

Non-synchronous transmissions are found primarily in various types of industrial machinery; such as tractors and semi-tractors. Non-synchronous manual transmissions are also found on motorcycles, in the form of constant-mesh sequential manual transmissions. Prior to the 1950s and 1960s, most cars used constant-mesh and sliding-mesh non-synchronous transmissions.

== History ==
Most early automobiles were rear-engined, using a single-speed transmission and belt-drive to power the rear wheels. In 1891, the French Panhard et Levassor automobile used a three-speed manual transmission and is considered to have set the template for multi-speed manual transmissions in motor vehicles. This transmission used a sliding-gear design without any form of speed synchronization, causing frequent grinding of the gear teeth during gear shifts.

The Panhard design was refined over the years by other manufacturers to include "constant-mesh" gears (instead of sliding gears). The first usage of synchromesh was by Cadillac in 1928.

== Driving techniques ==
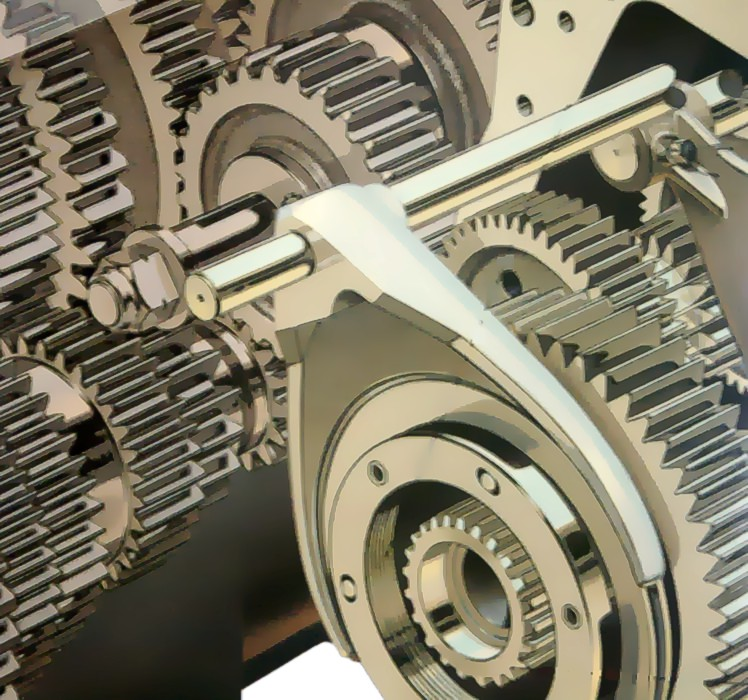
Commercial vehicle transmission diagram showing the gear fork, gearbox, and gears

Trained drivers of vehicles with non-synchronous transmissions sometimes use the techniques listed below. If improperly implemented, these techniques can cause damage to the vehicle or the loss of control of the vehicle.

- Double-clutching: releasing the clutch in neutral to synchronize the speeds of the shafts within the transmission
- Float shifting: shifting without using the clutch

In big rigs and semi-trucks, the driver may have to complete 24 or more gear changes when accelerating from a standstill to 70 mph (110 km/h).

== Clutch brake ==
Unlike any other type of transmission, non-synchronous transmissions often have a clutch brake mechanism, which is usually activated by pressing the clutch pedal all the way to the floor or pressing a button on the top of the gear lever. The purpose of the clutch brake is to slow down (or stop) the rotation of the transmission's input shaft, which assists in shifting the transmission into neutral or first gear when the vehicle is at a standstill. The clutch brake not only slows or stops the idle gear axis but can also prevent shifting into gear until the clutch pedal is released a few centimetres (or inches) off the floor. In order to shift into gear, the clutch must be halfway off the floor, otherwise, the clutch brake will prevent the transmission from being shifted into or out of gear.

== Comparison of transmissions ==
Any transmission that requires the driver to manually synchronize the engine speed with the speed of the driveshaft is non-synchronous. Non-synchronous transmissions are mostly used in semi-trucks, large industrial machines, older agricultural tractors (e. g. Massey Ferguson 135) and power take-offs.

Sequential manual transmissions, which are commonly used in motorcycles, ATVs, and racecars, are a type of non-synchronous (unsynchronized) manual transmission, where gear ratios must be selected in succession (order), hence direct access to a specific gear ratio is not possible.

Most manual transmissions in modern passenger vehicles are fitted with synchromesh to equalize the shaft speeds within the transmission, so they are synchronous transmissions. All automatic transmissions have synchronizing mechanisms, and semi-automatic transmissions that use dog clutches typically have cone-and-collar synchronizing mechanisms.

== See also ==
- Gear ratio
- Mechanical engineering
