= Heel-and-toe shifting =

Driving technique

Heel-and-toe shifting is an advanced driving technique used mostly in performance driving with a manual gearbox, although some drivers use it on the road in everyday conditions in the interest of effectiveness. It involves operating the throttle and brake pedals simultaneously with the right foot, while facilitating normal activation of the clutch with the left foot. It is used when braking and downshifting simultaneously (prior to entering a turn), and allows the driver to "blip" the throttle to raise the engine speed and smoothly engage the lower gear.

== Usage ==
Heel-and-toe shifting is used before entry into a turn while a vehicle is under braking, preparing the transmission to be in the optimal range of rpm to accelerate out of the turn. One benefit of downshifting before entering a turn is to eliminate the jolt to the drivetrain, or any other unwanted dynamics. The jolt will not upset the vehicle as badly when going in a straight line, but the same jolt while turning may upset the vehicle enough to cause loss of traction if it occurs after the turn has begun. Sporting vehicles are usually modified (if necessary) so that the heights of the brake and accelerator pedals are closely matched when the brake is sufficiently depressed, and the pedals are not too far apart to permit easy use of heel-and-toe.

The name stems from pre-WW2 vehicles where the accelerator pedal was in the centre (between the clutch on the left and the foot brake to the right). The brake was able to be operated with the heel whilst the accelerator pedal could be simultaneously pressed with the toe. The technique is carried out in modern cars by operating the brake with the toe area, while rocking the foot across to the right to operate the throttle with the right side of the foot. With practice, it becomes possible to smoothly and independently operate both pedals with one foot.

As the power band of most race cars is found high in the rev range, this technique can also be used to ensure that engine rpm does not drop below the power band of the car while under braking, by allowing a lower gear to keep the engine in the desired rev range. The importance of this is to avoid delay between the driver accelerating after the corner and when the car responds. This is especially true in turbocharged cars where not only is it important to maintain the required rev range for strong positive boost, but the 'blipping' of the accelerator can also be used to maintain turbine speeds and thus avoid turbo lag. This technique ensures that maximum power can be reached the instant the brake pedal is released and the accelerator fully depressed.

Rowing is the technique of downshifting more than one gear along with the heel-and-toe technique to provide engine braking and smoother deceleration/braking while in the intermediate gears. This provides for maximum braking when going from a top gear to a much lower gear, and optimal engine rpm for exiting the corner.

== Synchronized down shift rev-matching system ==
Synchronized downshift rev-matching system (SynchroRev Match) is a technology invented by Nissan for use on the Nissan 370Z. In combination with the Electronic Control Unit (ECU) and various sensors, the engine electronically blips the throttle for the driver during both downshifts and upshifts to allow for better and smoother shifting, and improved handling.

=== Purpose ===
When a car with a manual transmission is in motion with the clutch engaged, there is a mechanical connection between the engine and wheels which keeps them in sync with each other. When shifting, however, depressing the clutch is required. This disconnects the engine from the wheels, and the engine speed is no longer linked to that of the wheels. When upshifting, this is usually not a problem, as the tendency of the engine to reduce speed itself without gas will slow it to loosely match the lower speed of the higher gear. However, when downshifting, the engine needs to speed up to come to speed with the wheels. If the accelerator is not "blipped" (or briefly and quickly pressed to speed up the disengaged engine), the engine will have to take power from the wheels and momentum of the car to come to speed, which is often accompanied by a sudden deceleration of the vehicle due to the power suddenly going to the engine, often described as a "lurch" or "jolt". This sudden external acceleration of the engine through the transmission also causes increased wear on the mechanics of the car. Therefore, a staple of advanced or professional manual-transmission driving is the "rev match", or "throttle-blip", in which the driver quickly brings the engine up to speed with the wheels by use of the throttle. As downshifting is often necessary when accelerating into or out of a curve or other slow-down, advanced techniques such as the "heel-toe method" are often required, in which the toe of the right foot presses on the brake pedal, while the heel of the same foot blips the throttle.

Nissan's SynchroRev Match system makes such throttle blipping and advanced techniques by the driver unnecessary and accomplishes engine rev-matching automatically.

=== Implementation and experience ===
The system employs sensors on the clutch pedal, gear shift, and transmission, and is coordinated by the ECU. When the clutch pedal is depressed, the system waits for the user to either move the shifter to a different position or to re-engage the clutch. If a new gear is never selected but the clutch has been depressed long enough for the engine to lose speed, the system will bring the engine back to speed for the same gear if the driver begins to raise the clutch. If the shifter is moved to a higher gear and the clutch is re-engaged quickly, the system will let the natural deceleration of the engine sync the drive train with the higher gear. If the clutch is depressed long enough for the engine to fall below the speed of the higher new gear, the computer will blip the throttle to bring the engine back to speed. Most usefully, if a new, lower gear is selected, the computer will accelerate the engine to the new estimated speed, even to the point of redline.

In all cases, the computer continues to adjust the throttle to match the ever-changing target speed of the wheels when the clutch is partially engaged, as the vehicle speed may often change while shifting (for example due to shifting while going up or down a hill). In actual execution, the computer is able to "blip" the throttle due to the presence of an electronic throttle, in which the computer has direct control over both the fuel and air inputs to the engine. As the accelerator pedal in such a system has no direct mechanical connection to the throttle valve, the engagement of the system to change engine speeds is apparent to the driver via sound and tachometer cues only, and the feel or weight of the accelerator pedal remains constant. Regardless of the previous operation, the involvement of the system is ended when the clutch pedal reaches a certain point of re-engagement to ensure the system does not interfere with the driver's intended power output to the wheels. In any case, Nissan has provided a switch to disengage the system, for example in the case of the driver preferring to perform their own rev-matching.

== See also ==
- Synchronized transmission
