= Float shifting =

Method of changing gears

Float shifting, or floating gears, is the process of changing gears, in typically a non-synchronous transmission, without depressing the clutch. Shifting in this manner is also used with synchronous manual transmissions, particularly after a clutch failure, to prevent destroying the synchromeshes with the power of the engine.

Drivers can shift non-synchronous transmissions without using the clutch by bringing the engine to precisely the right speed in neutral before attempting to complete a shift. If done improperly, it can damage or destroy a transmission. Some truck drivers use this technique with the higher gears. The technique is sometimes also used on motorcycles, but has largely been replaced by quickshifters for competitive use.

== Technique ==
After bringing the engine up to speed in a gear, the driver senses the need to upshift. To get out of the current gear without using the clutch, the driver backs off slightly on the accelerator and gently pulls the gear stick toward the neutral position. If they back off enough, a moment comes when the engine is neither driving the car nor being driven by the car; at that moment the stick moves freely, and the transmission "effortlessly" shifts out of gear. Next, to get into the chosen higher gear without using the clutch, they back off on the accelerator a little more and gently push the gear stick toward the chosen higher gear. A moment comes when the engine rpm has decreased enough to synchronize that chosen gear. At that moment, the transmission "effortlessly" shifts into that gear. To shift down, the driver similarly backs off on the accelerator and "falls out of" the current gear, but then pushes a little harder on the accelerator to increase the rpm enough to match and allow them to "fall into" the chosen lower gear.

== Pros and cons ==
Float shifting can reduce clutch wear because it is used so much less (only for starting from a standstill). Conversely, improper engagement of a gear (when the engine and transmission speeds are not matched) can cause wear on the synchros and lockouts, and damage the gears by physically grinding them together due to a difference in speed. Float shifting also tends to be slower than using the clutch.
