= BL R-series engine =

Line of petrol engines for the Austin Maestro car

The R series is a line of petrol engines introduced by British Leyland in 1983 for the then-new Austin Maestro. It was only produced in one capacity—1.6 litres.

== Design ==
The engine was essentially a lightly modified version of the E-series unit found in the Maxi and Allegro. The main differences over the older engine are to the sump and gearbox mounting flange, which were adapted to accept a traditional "end-on" transmission unit which had been bought from Volkswagen in place of the traditional BMC transmission-in-sump arrangement. It retains the 1.5-liter E-series' bore of 76.2 mm (3.00 in) along with a longer 87.6 mm (3.45 in) stroke. The longer stroke was obtained by a revised crank throw.

Like the E-series, it has a cast iron block and aluminium head. As with the E, the cylinders are siamesed, to fit the biggest bore cylinders possible. The combustion chambers were of Weslake's kidney-shaped design. The carburettor for the regular version was a single-venturi one with an automatic electronic choke, while the MG version received two twin Weber 40 DCNF carburetors and none of the fuel-saving electronics. Maximum power is 81 and 102 hp (60 and 76 kW) at 5,500 and 6,000 rpm respectively.

== Problems ==
The R series was mainly a stop gap, and had a very short production run that lasted barely two years. BL had been working on a more substantially revised version of the E series, but this was not ready for production in time for the Maestro's already badly delayed launch. The company was instead forced into launching the Maestro with the half-developed power unit which cost the company dearly—R-series-equipped Maestros soon gained a reputation for hot starting problems, cylinder head gasket failures (endemic to the E series also), and premature crankshaft failure. Because the E series was turned through 180 degrees in order to accommodate an end-on transmission, the R series was fitted to the Maestro with the carburettor facing the front of the car, which also led to a reputation for carburettor icing in cold weather.

The endemic problem of crankshaft failure was later attributed to flexing of the crankcase – because the E series relied upon the heavy sump/transmission unit to give additional strength to the cylinder block casting, this caused problems when a plain sump was bolted in its place. The sump in question was an aluminium alloy casting.

The R series was superseded in 1984 by the S series.
