= BL S-series engine =

The S series is a straight-4 SOHC internal combustion engine developed by the Austin Rover Group (subsidiary of British Leyland), and produced from 1984 until 1993. The engine was used in the Austin Montego, Mark 1 Rover 200-series and the MG Maestro. The engine was used in the Austin Maestro from 1985 onwards.

== Description ==
The engine comes from the same lineage as the BMC-developed E-series family introduced in the 1969 Austin Maxi, but with important modifications in order to facilitate compatibility with a conventional "end-on" transmission unit, in place of BMC/BL's traditional "gearbox-in-sump" configuration for its front wheel drive vehicles. The gearbox flange was redesigned to accept either a Volkswagen manual gearbox (for the Maestro/Montego), or the PG-1 transmission (for the Rover 200). The S-Series was produced in a single capacity of 1.6 litres (1,598cc) as the smaller and larger capacity requirements were already served by the 1.3-litre A-series/Honda EV engines and the 2.0-litre O-series engines respectively. Fuelling was by means of a single carburettor in most applications, and electronic fuel injection for the higher-specification variants of the Rover 216 producing peak power of 103 brake horsepower (77 kW).

BL had also developed the earlier R-series engine from the E-series family, but largely as a stopgap at the Maestro's launch since the S series was not yet ready for production. Because the E series had to be turned through 180 degrees in order to facilitate an end-on transmission, the resultant R-series unit had the inlet manifold on the front-facing side of the cylinder head, something which proved fatal for the engine's reliability—since it opened the door for carburettor icing. The S series solved this problem, as the inlet manifold was now on the rear face of the engine. Another important change vis-à-vis the E/R series, one with potentially negative consequences for the engine's durability, was driving the camshaft by a toothed belt in place of the previous timing chain system. Austin Rover claimed a 75% weight saving over the chain drive setup. The engine is non interference, thereby catastrophic engine failure will not occur, if the belt does snap.

== History ==
Production of the S-series engine continued until the end of Montego / Maestro series production in 1993, the remaining cars which were built by Rover until 1994 used only the Rover MDi/Perkins Prima diesel engine, which was based on the O-series.

A 4-valve version of the S series was under development alongside the 1100 cc and 1400 cc K-series engines. However, the project was abandoned when a redesign of the K series allowed its capacity to be stretched to 1600 cc and 1800 cc. The engine was given the name L16 but should not be confused with the L Series diesel engines or Datsun/Nissan L16 engine.
