= BMC E-series engine =

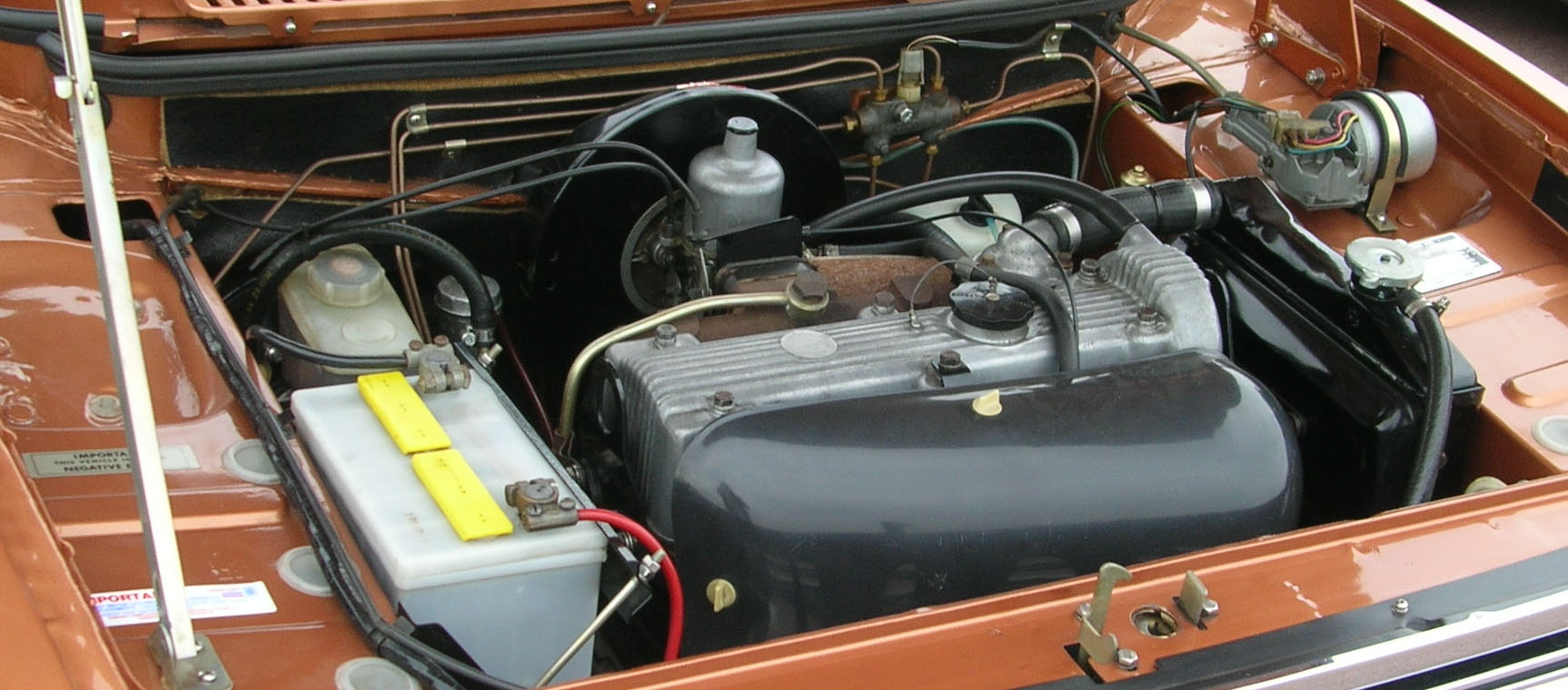
- 1.7 L (1,748 cc) E-series engine in a 1980 Maxi

Overview
- Manufacturer: British Motor Corporation (BMC)

Layout
- Configuration: Straight-4 and Straight-6
- Displacement: 1.5 L (1,485 cc); 1.7 L (1,748 cc); 2.2 L (2,227 cc); 2.6 L (2,622 cc)
- Cylinder bore: 76.2 mm (3.00 in)
- Piston stroke: 81.3 mm (3.20 in); 95.75 mm (3.770 in)
- Valvetrain: Overhead camshaft

Combustion
- Fuel system: Single or twin carburettor
- Fuel type: Petrol
- Cooling system: Water-cooled

Output
- Power output: 69–121 bhp (51–90 kW)
- Torque output: 83–165 lb⋅ft (113–224 N⋅m)

The BMC E-series engine is a line of straight-4 and straight-6 overhead camshaft automobile petrol engines from the British Motor Corporation (BMC). It displaced 1.5 L or 1.7 L in four-cylinder form, and 2.2 L or 2.6 L as a six-cylinder. The company's native United Kingdom market did not use the 2.6 L version, which was used in vehicles of Australian and South African manufacture. Although designed when the parent company was BMC, by the time the engine was launched the company had become British Leyland (BL), and so the engine is commonly referred to as the British Leyland E-series engine.

== History ==
The E series was an overhead cam design, planned essentially for front-wheel drive use in the BMC range. It was intended to replace the transverse A- and B-series overhead valve designs used at the time in other BMC cars (but see also the O series, another replacement line for the B series). A purpose built production facility was built at Cofton Hackett south of Longbridge, Birmingham to build the units. The first use of the E series was in the Australian built Morris 1500 sedan and Morris Nomad hatchback followed by the front-wheel drive Austin Maxi five-door hatchback of 1969. These models were closely based on the ADO16 platform, but fitted with the 1.5 L E series. The 1500 was a four-door saloon, the Nomad a five-door hatchback which whilst bearing a similarity in looks to the Maxi, was an entirely local design.

The E series was always intended to provide larger capacity six-cylinder engines made on the same tooling as the four-cylinder. The 6-cylinder version was originally designed by Leyland's Australian division. These were intended for use in physically larger, more upmarket versions of UK and European front-wheel drive models, and for use in a mixture of mass-market front- and rear-wheel drive models sold mainly in the markets of Australia, New Zealand and South Africa. Using a common design saved time, but had drawbacks. The six-cylinder had to be short to fit transversely across the nose of a front-wheel drive car. To save such horizontal space the engines were long in stroke and had no water-jacketing between cylinder bores. The engines were very tall though, combining long stroke with OHC. This, together with the gearbox in sump design, forced a high bonnet line when the E series was fitted to smaller cars, something which infamously compromised the styling of the Austin Allegro, which was originally intended to sport a much sleeker appearance until it was decided by BL management that it would use the E series in its largest engine variants.

A higher compression version of the 1.7 was developed utilising a twin carburettor set up with increased valve lift and flat-topped pistons.

As fours and sixes shared production tooling, the four also had a long stroke and siamesed cylinder liners, even though it did not need the reduced width. This was especially true in later designs of transverse-engined BMC and BL cars, when the side-mounted radiator was moved to fit across the nose of the car reducing overall width of the engine considerably. The lack of water jacketing caused considerable development problems when the 1.5 L in the Austin Maxi needed an optional larger engine size. The 1.5 L four-cylinder E series could not be readily bored out, the placing of the gearbox directly underneath the sump made stroking the engine more difficult, and the Maxi was too narrow to accommodate a large-capacity six-cylinder. Overcoming these problems meant that even a modestly increased displacement, to 1.7 L (1,748 cc), did not appear until 1971.

The engine was originally envisaged as a 1.3 and 1.5 L four-cylinder, with a 2.0 L six-cylinder created by adding two cylinders to the 1.3 L block. However, as development continued it appeared the 1.3-litre E series would not have any huge benefits over the 1.3-litre A-series being developed at that time from the existing 1.1, so the smaller E-series was dropped. The result was a saving in development capital for BMC, but also meant the six-cylinder had to be developed from the 1.5-litre block, creating its unusual engine size of 2.2 litres (2,227 cc).

== Later derivatives ==
The four-cylinder E series was effectively discontinued when the Allegro went out of production in 1982. However it was substantially redesigned into the R series, and later the S series in the mid-1980s. The R series was effectively a stop-gap solution for the Austin Maestro, and is all but identical to the E-Series, the main difference being modifications to take an end-on transmission, in place of the BMC 'transmission-in-sump' arrangement. The S-Series was a more thorough redesign, featuring a belt-drive camshaft in place of the E-series chain and a completely new cylinder head.

The six-cylinder version was not directly replaced.

== Engine sizes ==
=== 1.5-litre engines ===
The 1.5 L (1,485 cc) version was first used in the Austin Maxi 1969. Power output is 69 bhp (51 kW) and torque is 83 lb⋅ft (113 N⋅m) at 3200 rpm. Bore and stroke was 76.2 mm × 81.3 mm (3.00 in × 3.20 in).

Applications:

- Austin Maxi
- Austin Allegro
- Morris Nomad (Australia)
- Morris Marina & Leyland Marina (Australia)

=== 1.75-litre engines ===
The engine was enlarged to 1.7 L (1,748 cc) in 1971 by increasing the stroke to 95.75 mm (3.770 in). The engine was available in two versions: The single carb engine produces 76 bhp (57 kW) and 100 lb⋅ft (136 N⋅m) at 3100 rpm, while the twin carb version produces 90 bhp (67 kW) and 104 lb⋅ft (141 N⋅m) at 3100 rpm.

Applications:

- Austin Maxi
- Austin Allegro
- Morris/Leyland Marina (Australia)

=== 2.2-litre engines ===
The 2.2 L (2,227 cc), christened the E6-Series, was created by adding two cylinders to the 1.5-litre engine. Bore and stroke remained at the 76.2 mm × 81.3 mm (3.00 in × 3.20 in) of the four-cylinder engine. Max power output was 110 bhp (82 kW) and torque was 124 lb⋅ft (168 N⋅m) at 3500 rpm. It was first used in 1970 for the Austin 1800 update unique to Australia as the X6 ("cross six") range. This was composed of two models known as the Tasman and Kimberley. The engine saw its UK debut in the ADO17 'Landcrab' in March 1972, and was carried through in to the Princess (18/22 series) in 1975. It was last made in 1982.

Applications:

- Austin Tasman & Kimberley
- Austin 2200 / Morris 2200 / Wolseley Six (ADO17)
- Austin 2200 / Morris 2200 / Wolseley Saloon / Princess 2200 (ADO71)

=== 2.6-litre engines ===
The 2.6 L (2,622 cc) version was created by increasing the stroke to the 95.75 mm (3.770 in) used in the 1.7 L (1,748 cc) version. The power output was 121 bhp (90 kW) and torque was 165 lb⋅ft (224 N⋅m). This variant was used in longitudinal rear-wheel-drive applications only.

Applications:

- Leyland P76 (Australia)
- Leyland Marina (Australia)
- Rover SD1 (South Africa)
- Austin Marina (South Africa)
- Land Rover Series 3S (South Africa)

=== Prototype and experimental model designed for the E series ===
In late 1969 BLMC's design team created the MG'E' mock up with the intention of creating a 2-seater mid-engined sports car with a 1.5 E series transversely mounted mid way with hydrolastic suspension to replace the MGB. However cost constraints and the recent merger with Leyland/Triumph meant that all development was shelved on the project, as it would already be in a crowded sector within the company. A fibreglass full size mock-up is on display at the BMIHTGaydon, Warwickshire.

Alec Issigonis utilised the 1.5 E Series in the gearless Mini which he privately worked on during his time as a consultant in his later years after his official retirement from BLMC. This car can also be seen at Gaydon.

Gilbern sportscar manufacturer from Glamorgan, South Wales produced a prototype T11 in 1970 with the intention to use the E Series 1.5 with Maxi 5 speed cable change gearbox, Designed by Trevor Fiore, it was exhibited at the 1971 Geneva Motor Show, The design never saw production and only this example remains.

Gilbern T11
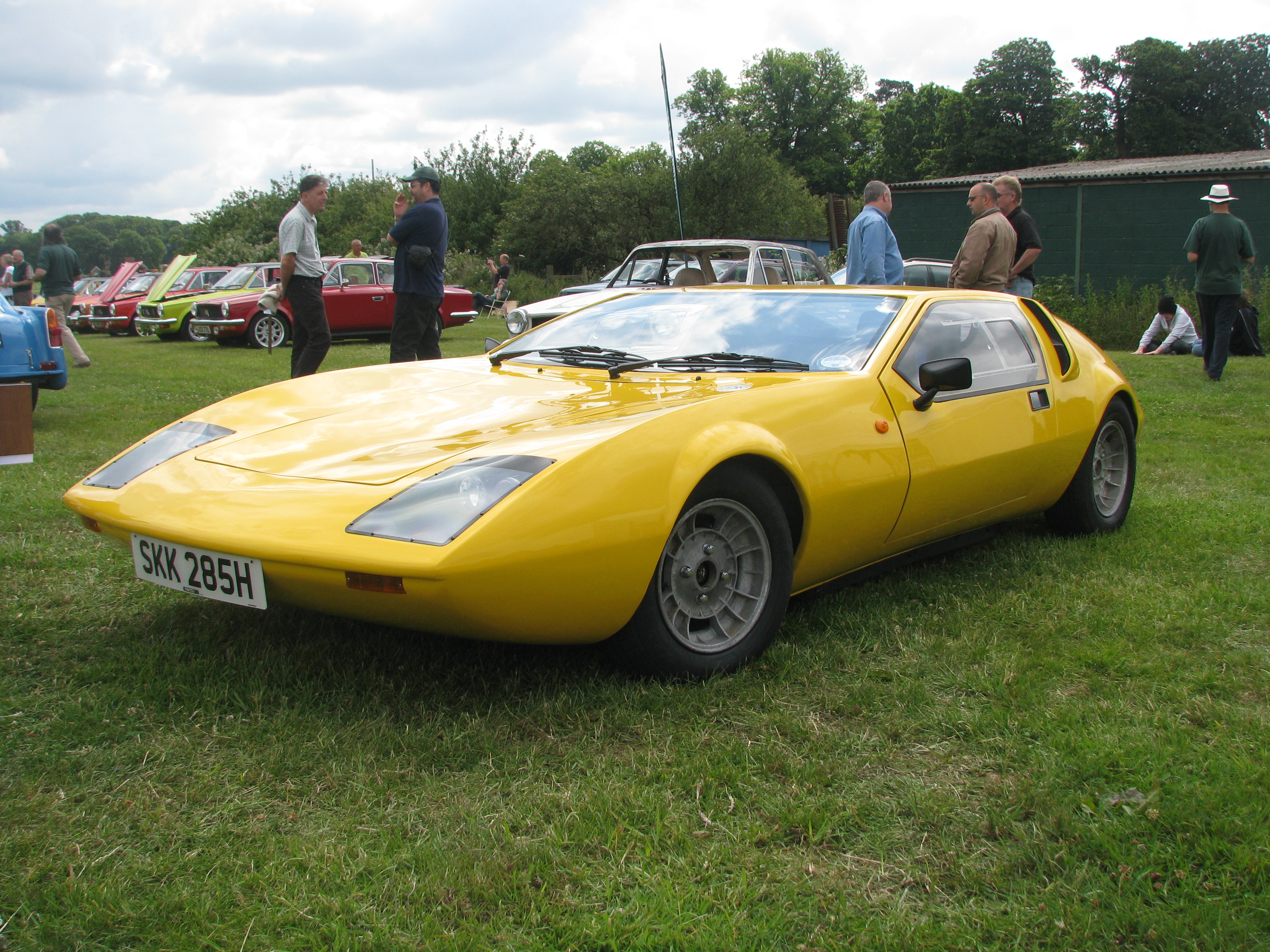

Overview
- Manufacturer: Gilbern Sports Cars (Components) Ltd
- Production: One example produced
- Designer: Trevor Fiore

Body and chassis
- Body style: 2-door coupé

Powertrain
- Engine: Austin Maxi E series
- Transmission: Maxi 5-speed manual all-synchromesh

At the 1972 Racing Car Motor Show in London, private designers Peter Bohanna and Robin Stables unveiled their concept Diablo mid engine sports car utilising a Maxi E-series engine and gearbox. AC Cars of Surrey needing a new fashionable mid engine car purchased the design and name with the idea of launching it at the 1973 Motor Show, however British Leyland stated that they could not guarantee supply of E series power and transmission units from Crofton Hackett due to the impending launch of the Allegro. In the event AC fitted the Ford Essex V6 with a specially constructed gearbox. It then suffered in development, owing to Type 1 crash approval, and was finally launched at the 1978 Motor Show as the AC 3000ME
