= Etsong Vehicle Manufacturing =

Chinese automobile manufacturer

Etsong (Qingdao) Vehicle Manufacturing Co. Ltd.
- Type: Subsidiary
- Industry: Automobile
- Founded: 1997
- Defunct: 2003
- Fate: Sold to First Automotive Works
- Headquarters: Qingdao, Shandong, China
- Area served: China
- Products: City cars, microvans

Etsong (Qingdao) Vehicle Manufacturing Co. Ltd. (颐中) was a former vehicle manufacturer based in Qingdao, China. They built local versions of the Austin Maestro and Montego with Toyota engines. Etsong was taken over by First Automotive Works in 2003 who kept building the Maestro/Montego in small numbers. The firm was then absorbed by SAIC-GM-Wuling in June 2005, in order to produce SGMW mini vehicles.

== History ==
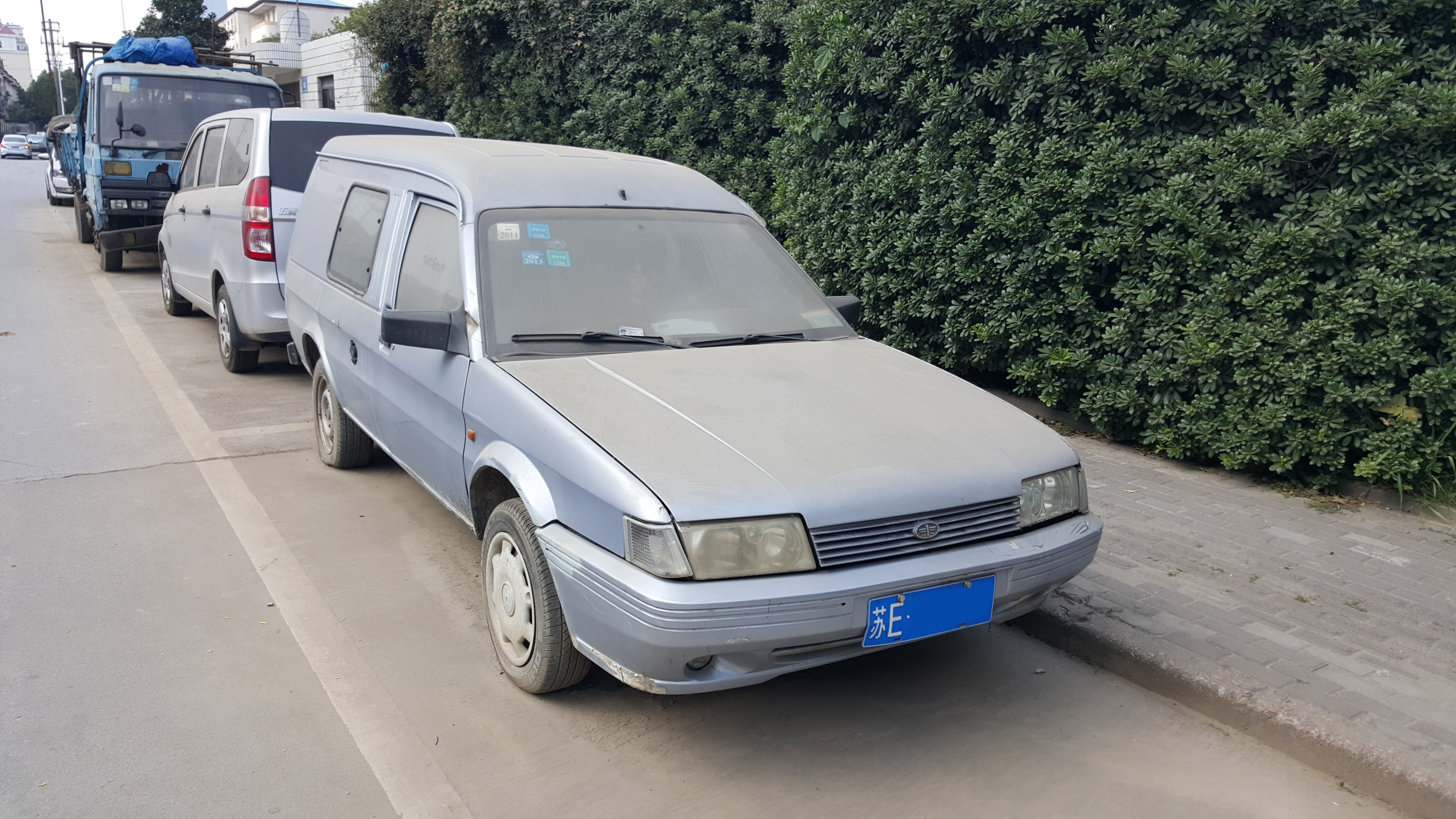

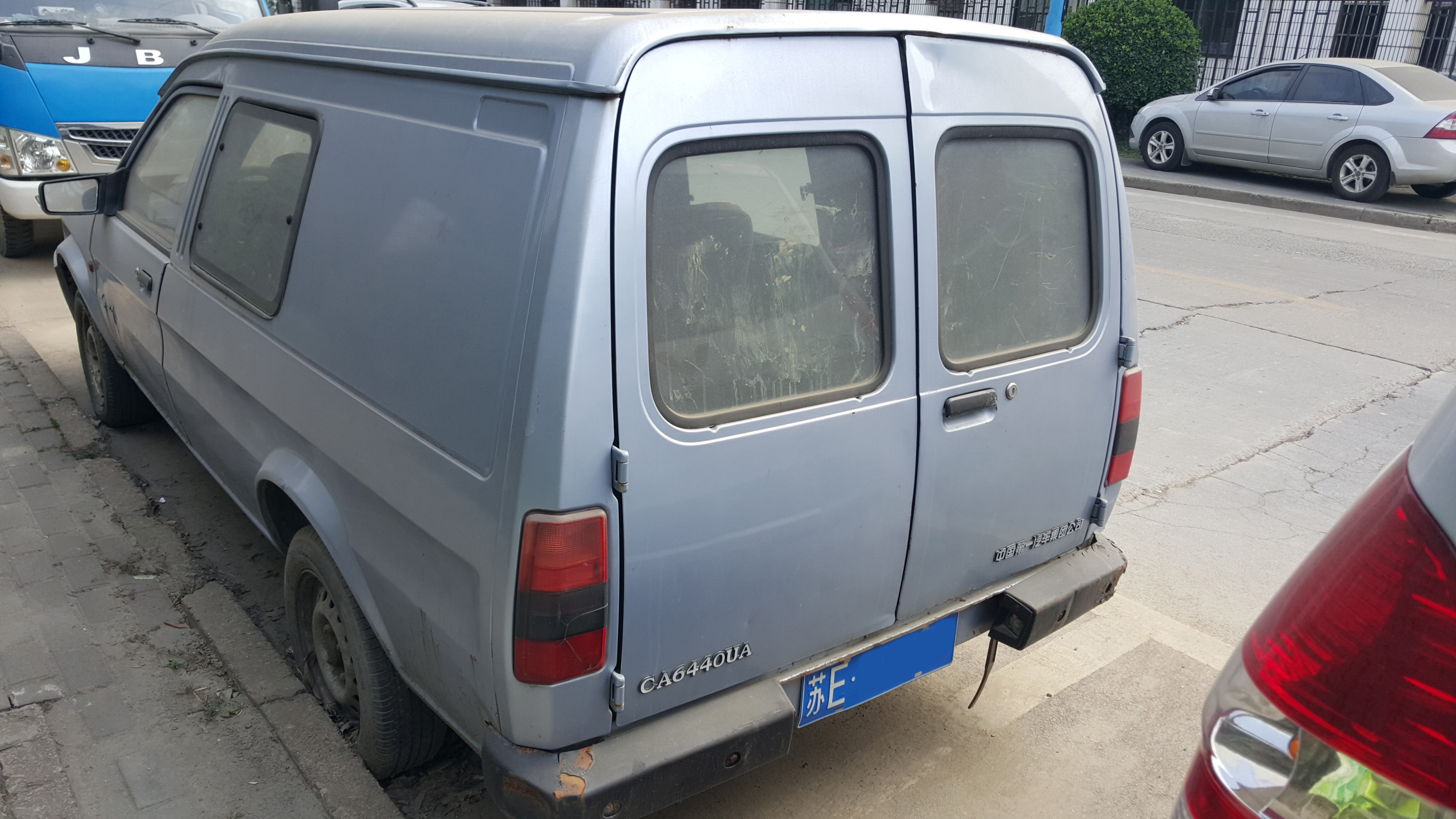
FAW CA6440UA

The tooling and intellectual property rights to the Austin Maestro and Montego were sold by MG Rover to RDS International Engineering, who then sold it on to Etsong. Etsong began building a factory for this new venture in March 1998. The first cars were Maestro vans, assembled in late 2000. By 2001, the Maestro hatchback had also entered production. Since Etsong was not a licensed automobile manufacturer, the cars had model codes in the 6000 range, meaning that they were classified as buses rather than automobiles. Etsong, intending for the Maestro to become a "Qingdao People's Car", also developed an "MPV" version, which was simply a Maestro van with side windows and rear seats fitted. The Etsongs are fitted with the 1,342 cc Toyota 8A-FE engine.

In 2003, the rights passed to First Automotive Works, which introduced a Maestro variant with a Montego front, the Lubao CA 6410, and a van, the Jiefang CA 6440 UA. The Lubaos were first shown in May 2003. In 2008 the Maestro Van was relaunched as the Yema SQJ6450 (Yema F-series) by Sichuan Auto Industry Group Company Ltd who had purchased the tooling from FAW. SGMW took over Etsong in the summer of 2005. The factory is now used to produce small cars and vans for SGMW.
