= Austin Maestro =

Car model

- 1984 Austin Maestro HLE

Overview
- Manufacturer: British Leyland (1982–1986); Rover Group (1986–1994)
- Also called: MG Maestro; Rover Maestro; FAW-Etsong Lubao (hatchback)/ Lande (van)
- Production: November 1982 – December 1994 (Austin/Rover Maestro); 1983–1991 (MG Maestro); July 1995–2001 (remaining CKD kits); 1998–2017 (China)
- Assembly: United Kingdom: Cowley, Oxford, England (Cowley plant); Bulgaria: Varna (Rodacar: 1995–1996); China: Qingdao (Etsong: 1998–2003); China: Changchun (FAW: 2003–2006); China: Chengdu (Sichuan Auto Industry Group Company Ltd: 2008–2017)
- Designer: Ian Beech; David Bache

Body and chassis
- Class: Small family car (C)
- Body style: 2-door van 5-door hatchback
- Layout: FF layout
- Related: Austin Montego; Yema F99

Powertrain
- Engine: 1.3 L A-series I4; 1.6 L R-series I4; 1.6 L S-series I4; 2.0 L O-series I4 (MG Maestro); 2.0 L Austin Rover MDi/Perkins Prima I4 diesel; China: 1.3 L 8A-FE I4; 1.5 L CQ4C15 I4
- Transmission: 4 or 5-speed manual 3-speed automatic

Dimensions
- Wheelbase: 2,510 mm (98.8 in)
- Length: 4,050 mm (159.4 in)
- Width: 1,690 mm (66.5 in)
- Height: 1,430 mm (56.3 in)

Chronology
- Predecessor: for Austin Maestro; Austin Maxi; Austin Allegro; for MG Maestro; MG 1300
- Successor: Rover 200 MkII

The Austin Maestro is a small family car which was produced in Oxford, England, from November 1982 to December 1994. There are two body styles, a five-door hatchback and a two-door van. It was introduced by British Leyland (BL) under the Austin marque, with the Rover Group (BL's successor from 1986 onwards) selling it simply as the Maestro starting from 1988. An MG-branded performance version was sold as the MG Maestro from 1983 until 1991.

The Maestro replaced the Austin Maxi and Austin Allegro, with the van version replacing the corresponding van derivative of the Morris Ital. Although later year models were sometimes informally referred to as the Rover Maestro, the car never wore the Rover badge. The Austin Montego saloon was a variant of the Maestro.

The Maestro was produced over a period of twelve years, with little change to its basic design, at Morris' former Oxford plant in Cowley, with 605,000 units sold in total. After production in the UK ended, knock-down kits were assembled in Varna, Bulgaria, from 1995 to 1996 under the Rodacar joint venture. Various derivatives were also made in China from 1998 to 2017.

== Background ==
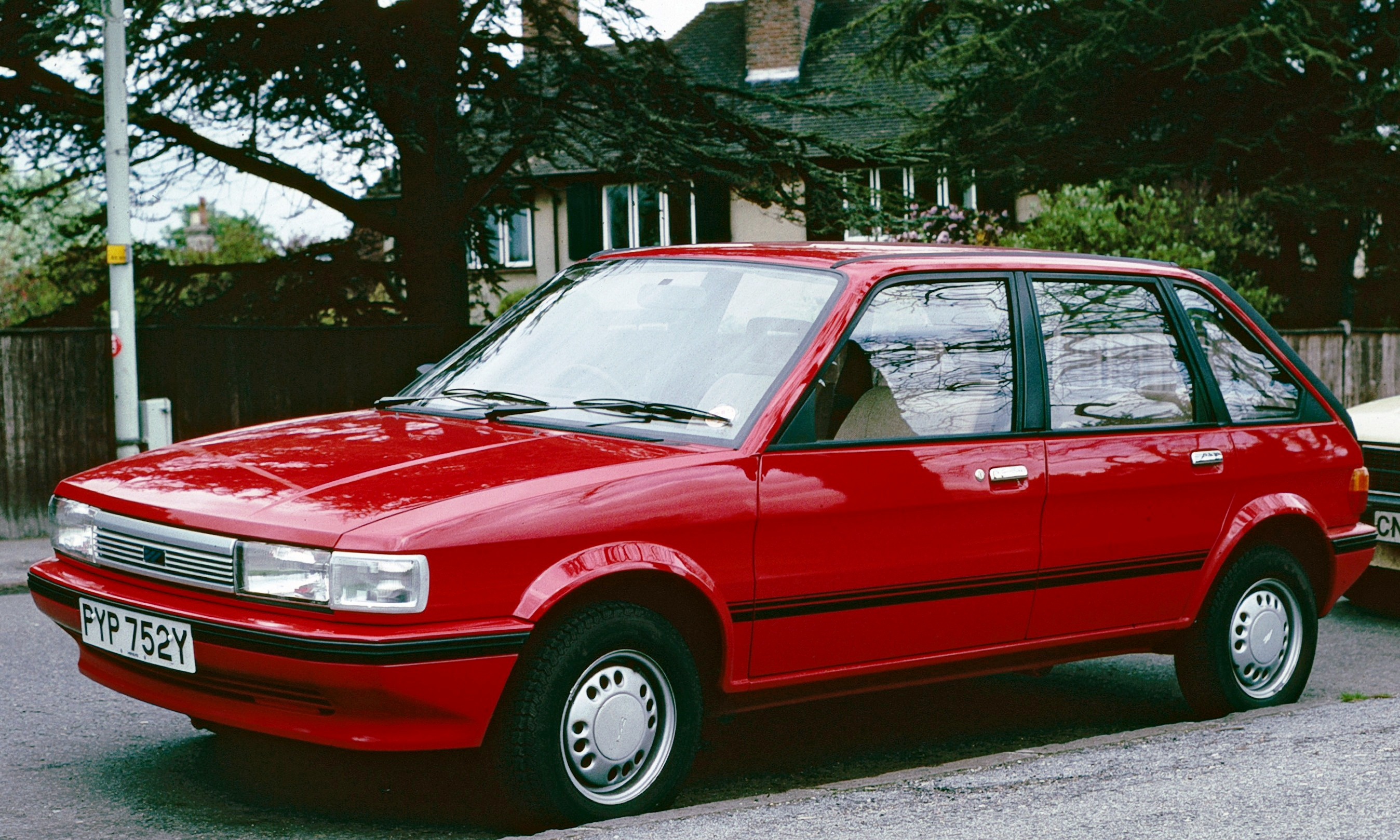
1982 Austin Maestro

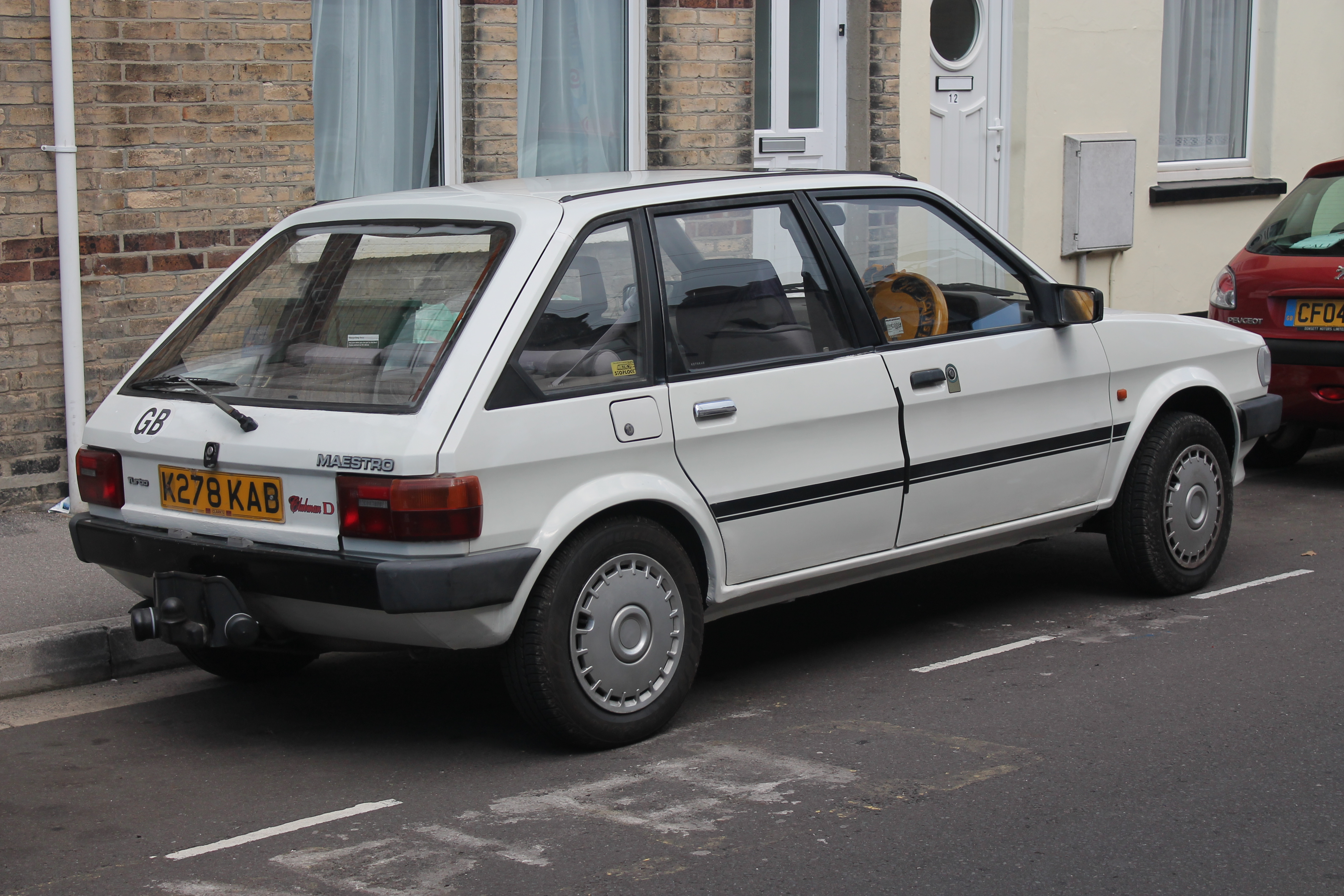
Austin Maestro rear (basic model with steel bumpers)

British Leyland was created in 1975 when the bankrupt British Leyland Motor Corporation was nationalized. In 1977, the South African-born corporate troubleshooter, Michael Edwardes, was recruited as chairman to sort out the troubled firm. Part of Edwardes' plan was to introduce a completely new range of mass-market models to replace the current offerings, designed and built using state-of-the-art technology. The new range eventually decided upon consisted of a new vehicle for each of the small, lower-medium and upper-medium market segments. The first of these cars to be launched was the Austin Metro in 1980.

== Design and development ==
The new cars for the lower and upper medium segments were to share a platform, with various trim and styling differences to distinguish the two different models. The two models would in effect replace four existing vehicles in the British Leyland range – the Maestro would simultaneously replace both the Austin Allegro and Maxi, whilst the Montego replaced the Austin Ambassador and Morris Ital, these latter two having been recent facelifts of the Princess and Morris Marina. Since all but the Allegro were made at the Cowley plant, this rationalization would give the cost benefits of production automation and flexibility. This common platform was given the project name LC10, using the Leyland Cars project sequence (LC8 became the Austin Mini Metro on its launch in 1980, LC9 became the Triumph Acclaim when it was launched in 1981). Preliminary design work for LC10 began in 1977, with production scheduled to begin around 1980 – which would have seen it go on sale around the same time as the Ford Escort MK3 and the original Vauxhall Astra.

LC10 was styled by Ian Beech under the direction of BL designer David Bache. Two main body variations were provided: a five-door hatchback and a four-door notchback. It was a departure from previous front-wheel drive cars from the company in dispensing with the famous Issigonis transmission-in-sump powertrain that had been pioneered in the Mini. Coupled to the A- and R-series powerplants was an end-on transmission (as pioneered by Fiat with the Autobianchi Primula), bought from Volkswagen. The sophisticated Hydragas suspension system used on previous BL models was sacrificed on cost grounds, with a conventional MacPherson strut system at the front and a Volkswagen Golf-style torsion beam at the rear being used instead – but with long travel rising rate springs. While easier to build, this suspension did compromise load space. Prototypes were even tested with actual Golf suspension components. This may have led to the early cars being prone to front wheel bearing issues. The Maestro was larger and heavier than the first VW Golf.

It was decided that the five-door hatchback version would be engineered first. It was given its own project designation, LM10, with this version to be launched as the Austin Maestro. The name "Maestro" had been a finalist when the Austin Metro was being named, with the third choice ("Match") never picked up. The booted notchback version was to follow and it was designated as LM11, although its development was to diverge from the original path, it was later launched as the Austin Montego on its launch in April 1984, following British Leyland's decision to discontinue the Morris marque.

The wheelbase was 2,510 mm (8 ft 2.8 in), and the length was 4,050 mm (13 ft 3.4 in).

The aerodynamic drag coefficient stood at 0.38 for most models, while the HLE and MG models had a coefficient of 0.36. The rear strakes on the tailgate of these models enabled a cleaner break away of the air flow round the back of the car. This is what largely contributed to this improved figure.

== Novel features ==
The Maestro incorporated many novel and pioneering features for its class. It had a bonded laminated windscreen, homofocal headlamps, body-coloured plastic bumpers, an electronic engine management system, adjustable front seat belt upper anchorage positions, an asymmetrically split rear seat, and a 12,000-mile (19,300 km) service interval. Another noteworthy point of interest at the time was the 'white lamp' indicators, rather than the traditional orange; the norm today. The MG and Vanden Plas versions had solid-state instrumentation with digital speedometer and vacuum fluorescent analogue displays for tachometer, fuel and temperature gauges, trip computer and a voice synthesis warning and information system. The voice came from New Zealand voice actress Nicolette McKenzie. The analogue instrument pod fitted to lower models was later used in the Range Rover from 1985 onwards.

== Product launch ==
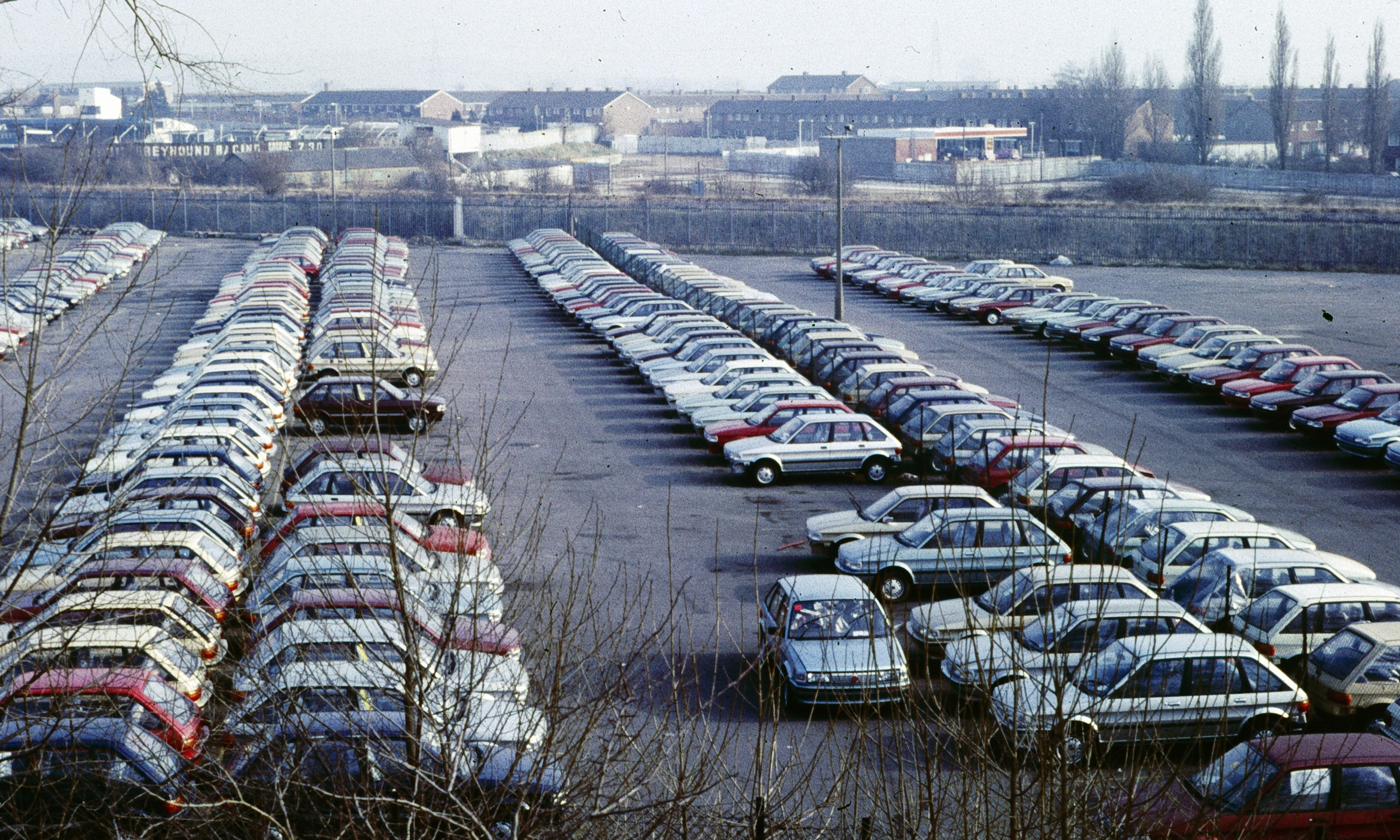
Austin Maestros in storage beside the manufacturers' Oxford plant in 1985

Production began in November 1982, and the Maestro was officially launched on 1 March 1983. In its summing up of the new car the Consumers' Association, in the June edition of its Which? journal, described it as roomy, comfortable, and nice to drive, and said "If you are considering buying one now, our advice, based on our first impressions, is to go ahead". In January 1984, after testing the car, they concluded: "In comparison with opposition of a similar price and body size, the Maestro has a clear advantage on room for passengers, with few cars equalling it for comfort either in the front or back". They also considered it to be a serious rival to the higher-segment Vauxhall Cavalier and Ford Sierra, apart from its smaller boot space.

The original lineup consisted of the 1.3-litre base, L, and HLE models, the 1.6-litre L, HLS, and Vanden Plas, and the sporty MG Maestro. The HLE model had a somewhat downtuned engine and received Volkswagen's "monstrously long-geared" 3+E transmission to maximize fuel economy, at the cost of severe performance loss. To further improve the HLE's economy, it was fitted with an econometer and the same black rubber fins along the sides of the rear windshield as was the MG Maestro. The base model forwent the other versions' plastic bumpers, instead being fitted with black-painted steel units. The plastic bumpers were the first of their kind, being made from polybutylene terephthalate (PBT), allowing them to be painted and then oven cured at the same high temperature as the car's steel body. The 1.6 HLS and Vanden Plas received a 4+E gearbox (a five-speed with a particularly long top gear), while the MG's closer ratio five-speed box derived from that of the Golf GTi. A trip computer with a voice synthesizer was standard on the MG and Vanden Plas models, with the Vanden Plas also benefitting from bronze-tinted windows, power locks, and power windows for the front doors.

The car was a reasonable success, but not as much as beleaguered BL had hoped. It was Britain's sixth best selling car in 1983 and 1984, with more than 80,000 sales in its second year.

== Later developments and engines ==
An early reputation for poor build quality and unreliability did not help the product's situation. The biggest problems centred around the 1.6-litre R-series engine, which was a hurriedly modified BMC E-series engine from the Austin Maxi because the under-developed S-series unit was not yet ready for production. R-series units suffered from hot starting problems and premature crankshaft failure. This was particularly evident in the MG Maestro 1600, which was included in the original 1983 model range but discontinued the following year.

The new S-series engine eventually appeared in July 1984, and was fitted to all existing 1.6-litre Maestros. The new S-series engine also came fitted with electronic ignition. At the same time, some minor equipment upgrades were made across the range. The 1.3-litre base model gained head restraints, a passenger door mirror and a radio. The 1.3-litre HLE, 1.6-litre automatic and 1.6 HLS all gained a radio-cassette player.

In October 1984, there were more equipment upgrades made across the range. The 1.3 base models gained reclining front seats, door bins, locking fuel filler caps and clocks. The L models gained cloth door trim, upgraded upholstery, and remote-adjustable driver's side door mirrors; the 1.6 Ls gained five-speed gearboxes. The 1.3 HLEs gained five-speed "4+E" gearboxes with overdrive fifth gear ratios, side mouldings, tweed cloth upholstery and remotely adjustable passenger's side door mirrors. The HLS and 1.6 automatics gained tinted glass, central locking, electric front windows, velour upholstery and upgraded radio-cassette players. The MG Maestros gained electronic fuel-injected 115 bhp (86 kW) versions of the 2-litre O-series engine, uprated suspension and ventilated front disc brakes, colour-keyed exterior trim, tinted glass, central locking and leather-trimmed steering wheels. The new MG Maestro offered much better performance and refinement than its predecessor.

Also in October 1984, the existing Maestro line-up was joined by the 1.3 HL and 1.6 HL. These models fitted between the L and HLE models.

August 1985 saw the arrival of the 1.3 City and 1.3 City X. The 1.3 City was similar to the previous 1.3 base model. The 1.3 City X added full carpeting, cloth upholstery, head restraints, a rear parcel shelf, a radio and a manually operated choke. These models also did without the plastic bumpers, having more conventional steel bumpers with plastic end caps similar to the Maestro van.

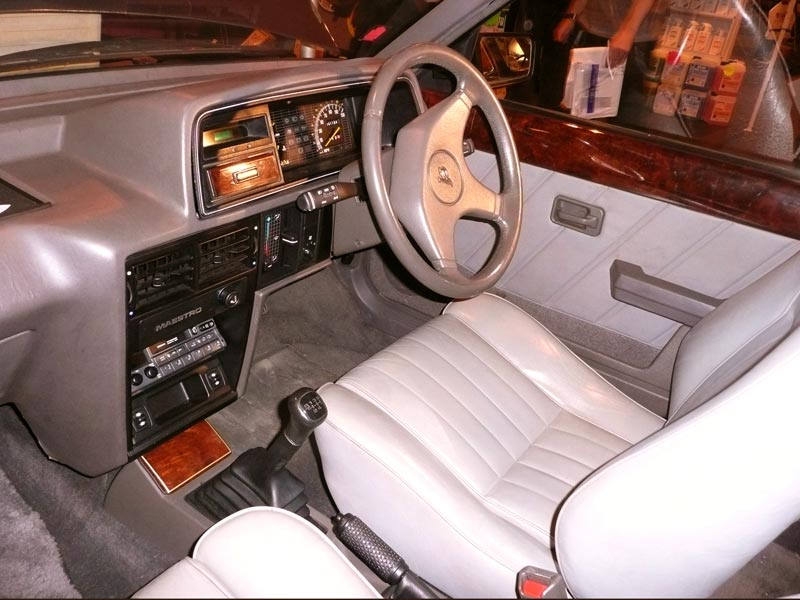
A later Vanden Plas interior

The original dashboard was of a multi-piece construction, and gained a reputation for being flimsy and prone to squeaks and rattles, so in February 1986, this was replaced with the more conventional dashboard from the Montego and in the change the voice synthesis unit (prone to reliability issues) was dropped. At the same time more minor equipment upgrades were made across the range. The City X gained door bins and rear wash-wipe. The L and LE gained tweed trim. The HL and automatic gained velour trim and additional brightwork. The Vanden Plas gained leather trim and uprated electronic stereo system.

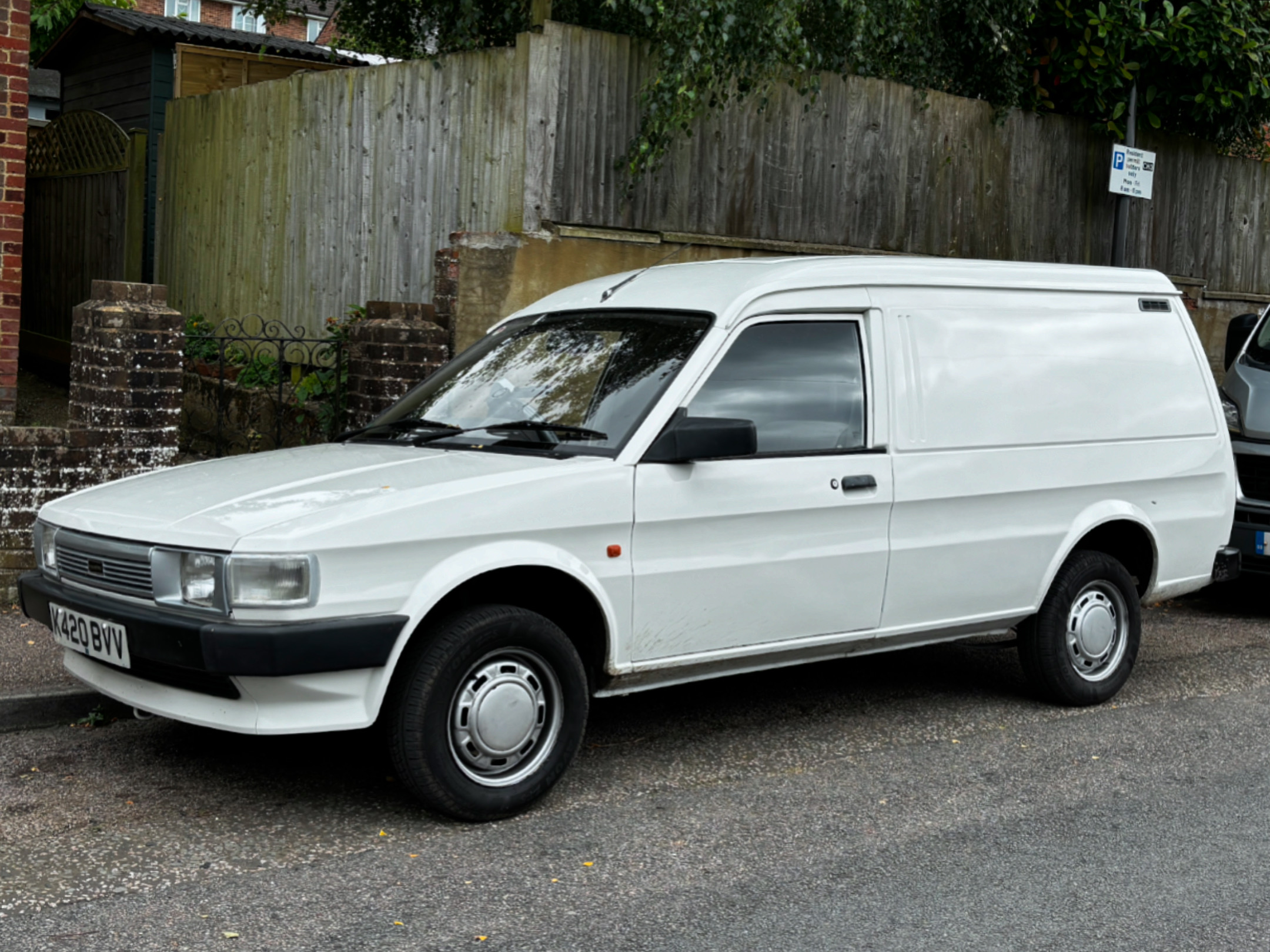
White Austin Maestro Van in UK specification

After the "boom" years of 1986 and 1987, Maestro sales went into decline.

BL was sold to British Aerospace in 1988, when the Austin badges were discontinued. The range was sustained by the noisy but economical direct injection naturally aspirated Perkins diesel unit launched the previous year. However, without a turbo this model was rather slow. The diesel had already been available in the Maestro van since 1986.

The MG Maestro Turbo, fitted with a turbocharged version of the 2.0 fuel-injected engine from the MG Maestro EFi, was unveiled at the Motor Show in October 1988 and went on sale on 17 March 1989. It was one of the fastest production hatchbacks in the world with a top speed of 129 mph (208 km/h), making it faster than the Ford Escort XR3i and RS Turbo, as well as the Volkswagen Golf GTI.

=== 1990s ===
Production of the Maestro, which was already suffering from a decline in sales, was pruned back by autumn 1989 on the launch of the second generation Rover 200, which was aimed at the higher end of the small family car market, with the Maestro being kept on sale as a cheaper alternative with more basic versions available. MG variants were discontinued in 1991, their place effectively being filled in the Rover range by faster versions of the 200-series hatchback. In 1992, the 81 bhp (60 kW) high revving Rover MDi / Perkins Prima turbo diesel unit from the Montego was launched, in the now reduced Maestro range (after the launch of the Rover 200/400), as a Clubman with steel bumpers or DLX with plastic bumpers. The turbo improved refinement, as well as performance, at no cost to fuel economy. It was very competitively priced, it was about the same price as the Rover Metro and Peugeot 205 non-turbo diesel superminis that were a size smaller. The only other engine option was the elderly 1.3-litre A series.

The arrival of the Rover 600 in 1993 saw the closure of the Maestro/Montego assembly line, but small-scale production in complete knock down (CKD) kit form continued until 1994, when BMW's takeover of Rover saw production at least in Britain cease almost immediately. The chassis development for the Maestro and Montego's rear suspension was used as a basis for later Rover cars, and was well regarded. Today, the redeveloped Cowley factory builds the BMW Mini.

== MG versions ==
=== MG Maestro 1600 (1983–1984) ===
Rushed into production against engineers' advice at the launch in March 1983, the original MG Maestro was under-developed. Its 1.6-litre R-series engine ran roughly, was difficult to start when warm, and its Weber twin carburettors could not always be properly tuned by dealership workshops, who were used to SU carburettors. The R-series model was replaced in July 1984 with the short-lived S-series model, which was built until October 1984 when the EFi was launched. Despite the reliability issues, more than 15,000 MG Maestro 1600s were built.

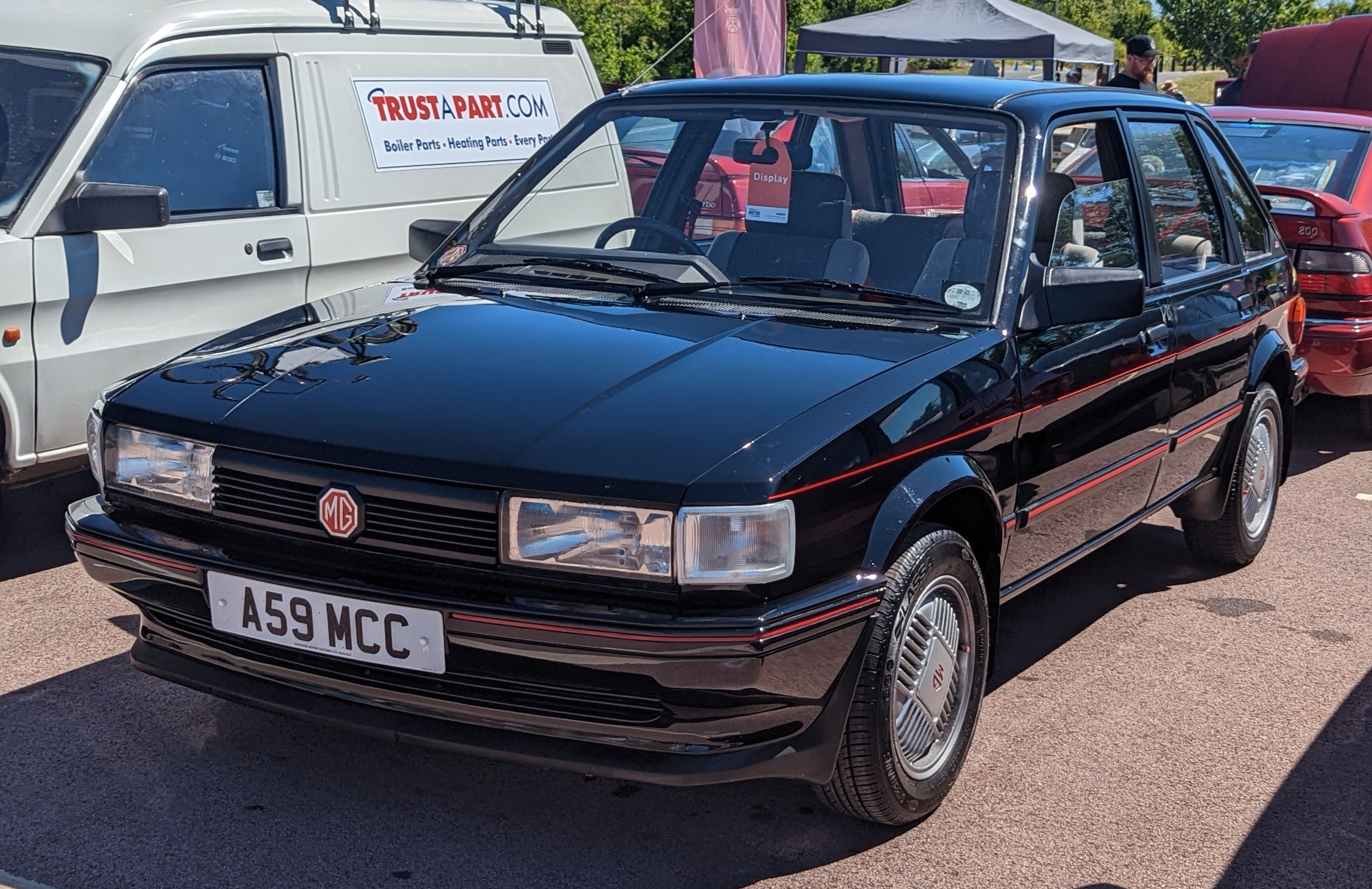
MG Maestro 1600

=== MG Maestro 2.0 EFi (1984–1991) ===
After a brief interval, the MG Maestro was relaunched in October 1984 with a fuel-injected 2.0-litre O-series engine that gave considerably better performance than its predecessor. Handling and performance were both improved and gave Austin Rover its first serious rival for the Golf GTI and Escort XR3i. It had a claimed output of 115 bhp (86 kW), a top speed of 115 mph (185 km/h) and a 0-60 mph time of 8.5 seconds. It was also mated with a Honda PG1 gearbox for improved gearchange, in preference to the Volkswagen box as supplied to the rest of the range.

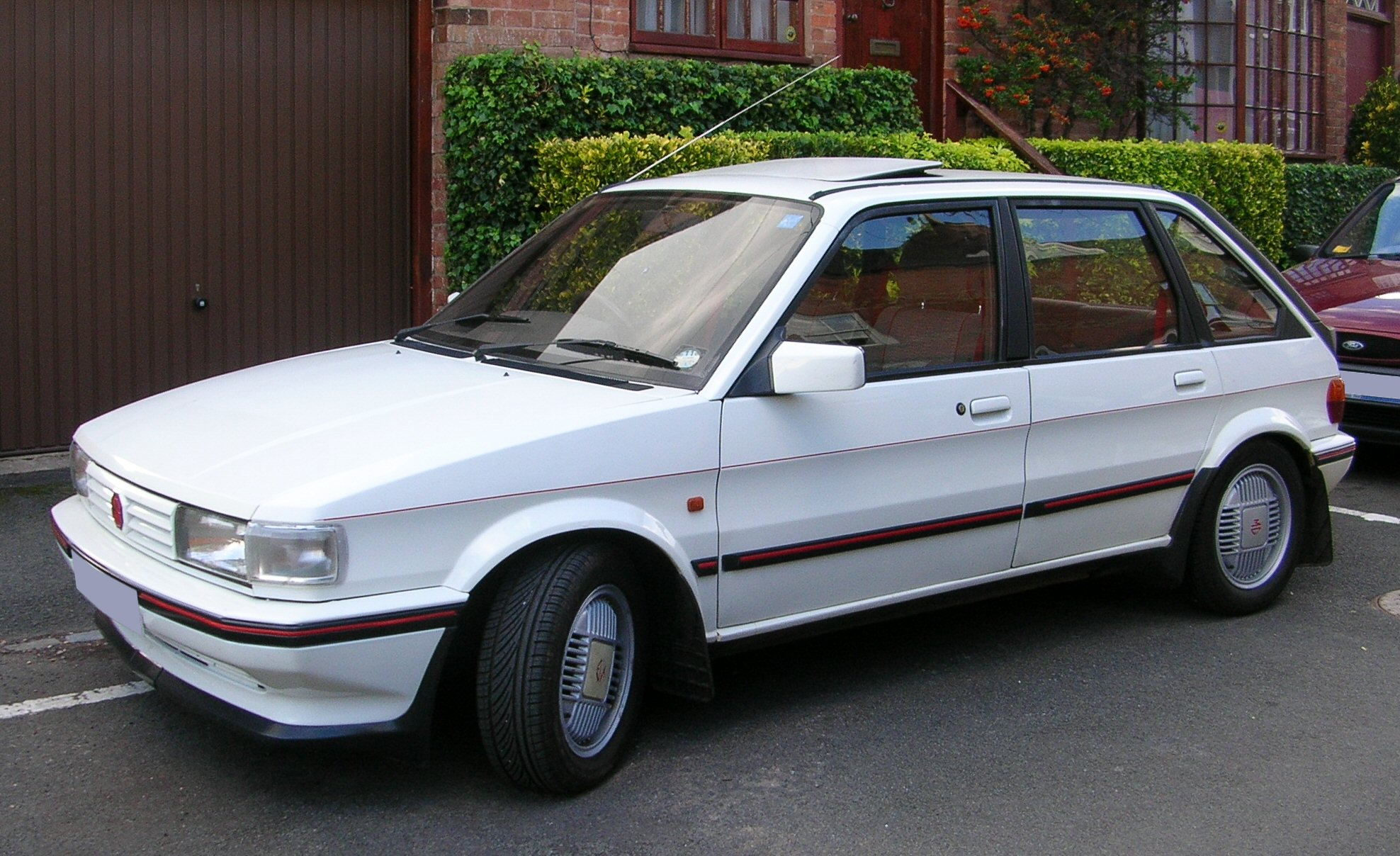
MG Maestro EFi

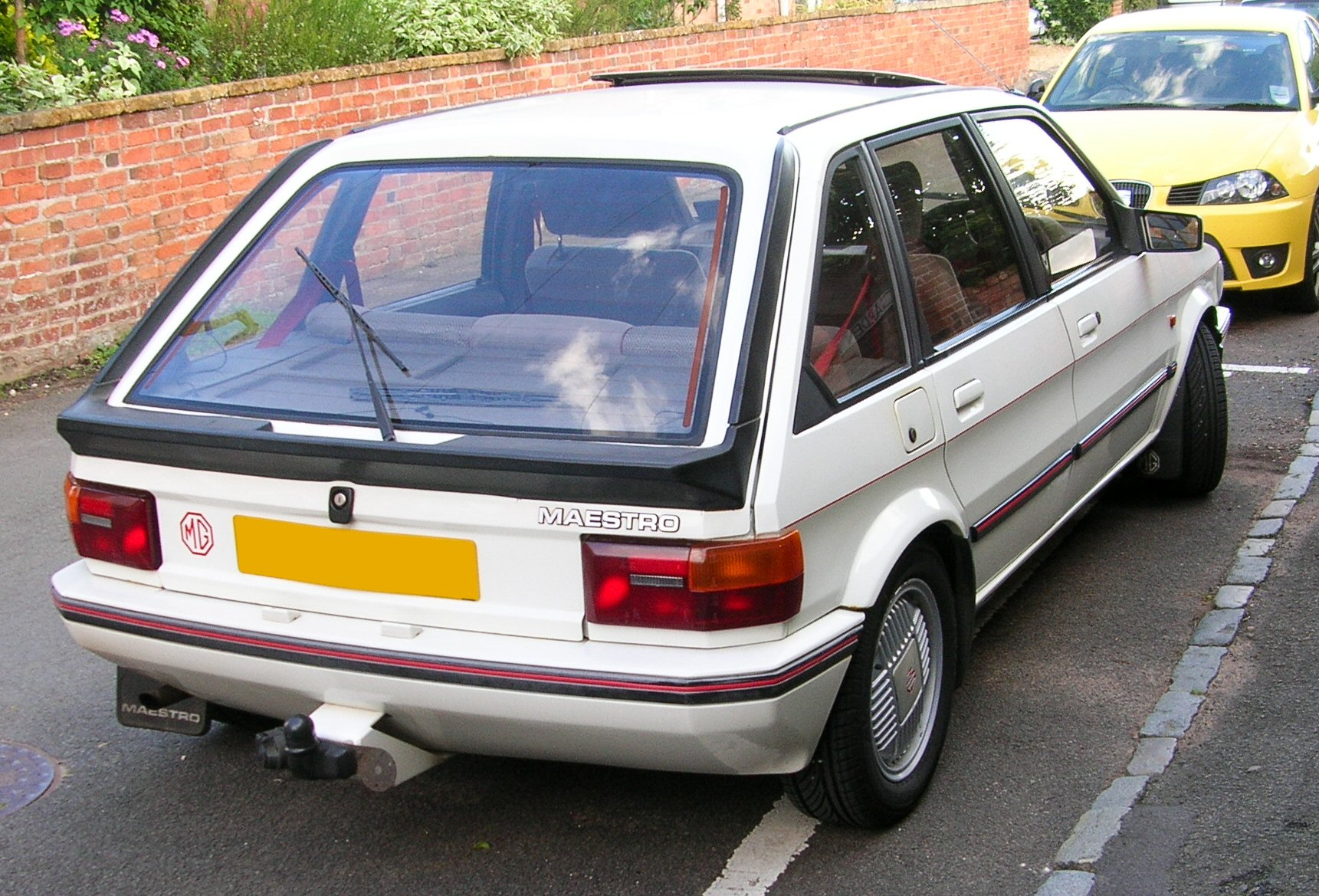
MG Maestro EFi

=== MG Maestro Turbo (1989–1991) ===
With the Rover Group only a few months away, the limited edition (500 + 5 press cars) MG Maestro Turbo (displayed at Birmingham in October 1988 and launched in early 1989) was the final car from ARG. It made use of the 2.0's already impressive engine, but the combination of carburetor and turbocharger gave it a top speed of 128 mph (206 km/h) and a 0–60 mph time of 6.7 seconds. It was faster than the majority of its competitors, but the high performance, Tickford designed bodykit and alloys did little to disguise the fact that it was very much still a Maestro. Sales were slow, as it appeared six years after the Maestro's launch.

Production of the MG Maestro finished in 1991, as Rover had launched GTi versions of the new 200 and 400 models, though the standard Maestro remained in production until 1994.

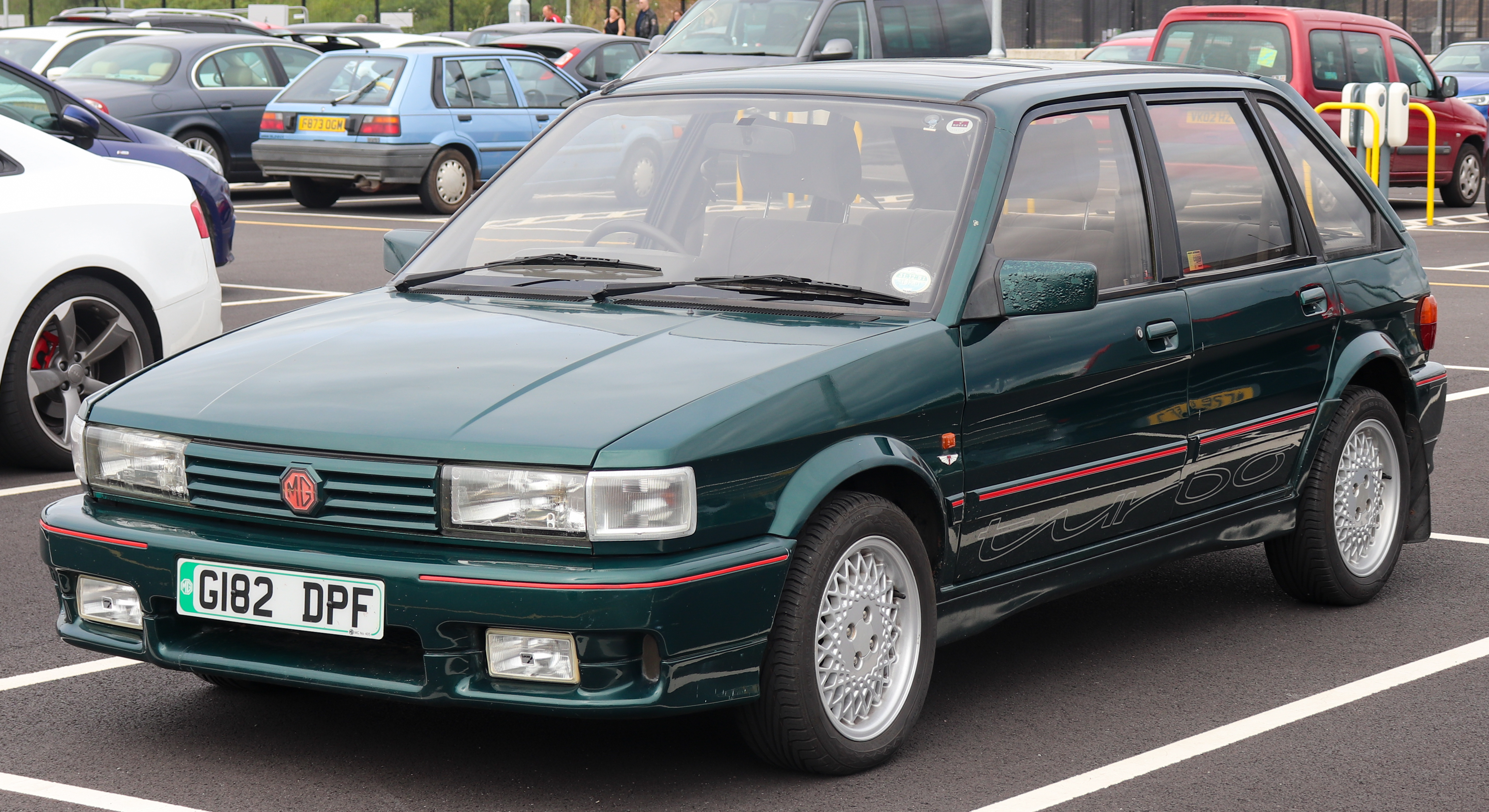
MG Maestro Turbo

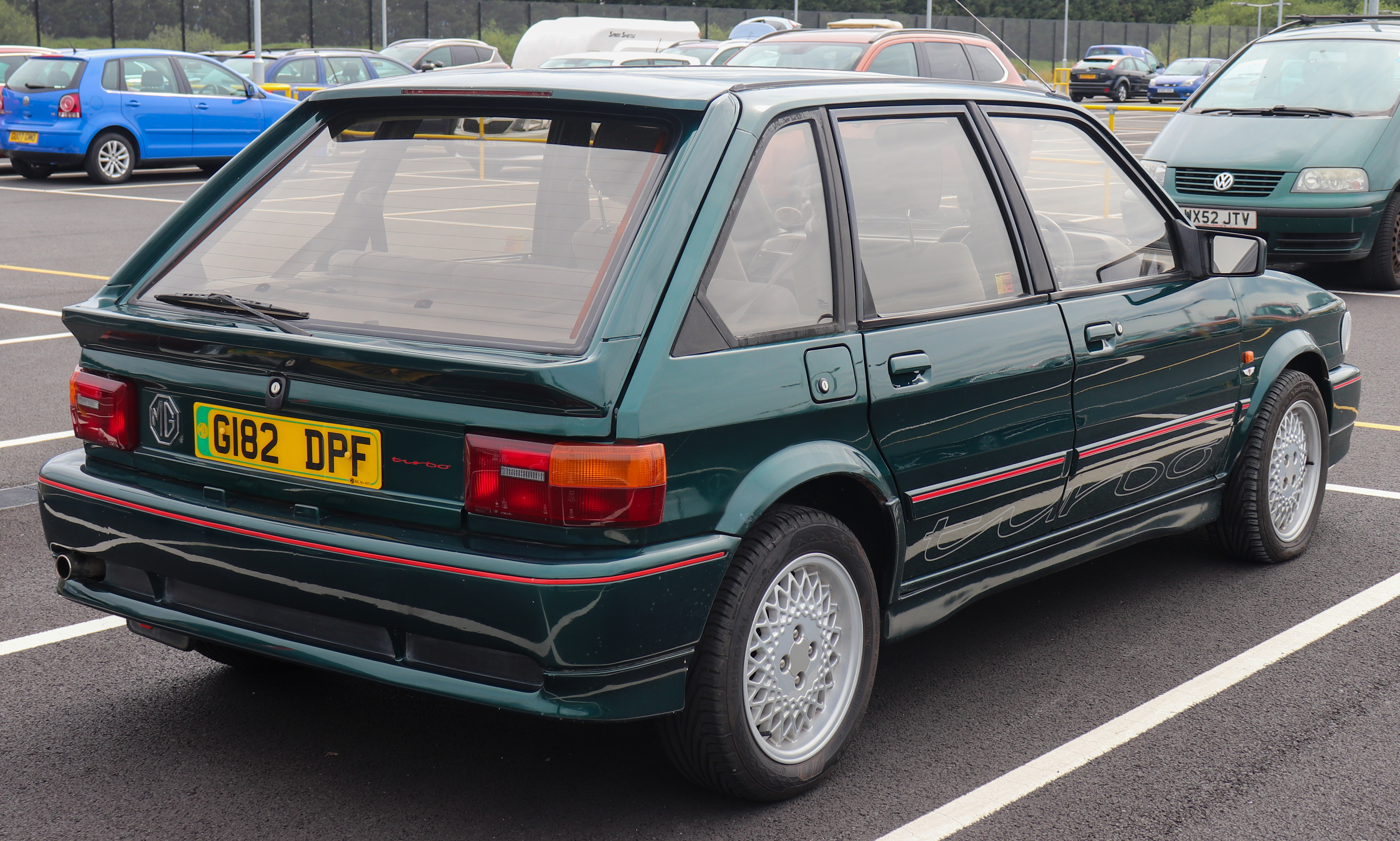
MG Maestro Turbo

== Fuel ==
Like most pre-1989 Austin Rover cars, 1.3-litre and 1.6-litre Maestros cannot run on unleaded petrol without the cylinder head being converted (remachining of the cylinder head), or the use of fuel additives. FBHVC (Federation of British Historic Vehicle Clubs) tested and approved lead replacement fuel additives, work out at only a couple of pence a litre. The 1994 cc O-series engine in the MG EFi, 2.0i and Turbo has sufficiently hard exhaust valves and seats.

Muddying the water slightly, contemporary sales literature for the MG Turbo (and the owners' handbook) advised drivers to use only 4* leaded petrol. This was because unleaded petrol was only available with an octane rating of 95 RON. The turbo engine was tuned for the higher 97 RON octane rating of leaded petrol, which improves combustion and reduces the chances of 'pinking' and running lean on boost: both very harmful to turbo engines. Modern high-octane unleaded petrol is a perfectly suitable substitute, but it had yet to become available on forecourts when the cars were current.

== Reception ==
=== Critical ===
In June 1987, the Automobile Association (AA) came to the following conclusion in the car magazine Your Car Magazine: 'The Maestro is a reliable vehicle which has improved over the years.'

In 1987, after an endurance test of 50,000 kilometers with an Austin Maestro 1.6 Mayfair, the Dutch car magazine Autovisie wrote that they 'can state without reservation that today's Austins have the same level of quality as other, more selling manufacturers. The Maestro appears to be a good alternative for someone who wants to distinguish himself from the average Escort/Golf/Kadett brigade.'

In June 1989, Autocar & Motor wrote: 'The latest Maestro's are well-built cars, comfortable to drive and still, after all these years, blessed with that fine handling/ ride combination. Like the Montego, they're much underrated.'

In 1993, What Car? buyers' guide section said: "Yes, its old, but nowadays it's also very cheap. Popularity of noisy but economical and surprisingly rapid turbodiesel is what keeps this roomy car going."

Also in 1993, the Automobile Association road tested the turbo diesel. Their verdict: "You're hardly likely to buy a Maestro diesel to improve your street cred! For turning heads, the 218/418 diesel is a much better proposition. However, disinterested passengers love the back seat, while the driver can relish the model's marked reluctance to visit filling stations. Here's a hatchback for buyers who are really serious about the substance rather than the image – and with a price tag that's thousands of pounds lower than most of its rivals (shown in our comparison chart), you start saving even before your first forecourt stop. Unless you're averse to gearchanging, this unpretentious Maestro turbo-diesel, at its competitive price, can't seriously be faulted."

In 1994, the Maestro finished in 26th place in the JD Power Survey broadcast by Top Gear. This clearly left the model above more recently appeared competitors such as the Volkswagen Golf (52nd), Vauxhall Astra (59th) and the Ford Escort (61st).

=== Production and sales numbers ===
Despite only going on sale in early March 1983, the Maestro was Britain's sixth best selling car in 1983 with more than 65,000 sales. Its first full year on sale, 1984, brought more than 83,000 sales – which would be the Maestro's best year for sales in any country. As had happened the previous year, it was Britain's sixth best selling car in 1984. However, it had fallen to 10th in 1985; although Austin Rover managed to keep up a strong presence in this sector due to the arrival of the similar sized Rover 200 saloon in June 1984. By 1988, it was merely the 14th best selling car in Britain, dipping further to 19th place in 1989, the year that the second generation Rover 200 was launched. The Maestro was now not only behind the all conquering Ford Escort and Vauxhall Astra (which first outsold it in 1985) in the sales charts, but also behind some foreign competitors including the Volkswagen Golf and Peugeot 309. Sales fell lower still afterwards, as the latest Rover 200 was firmly established as the Rover Group's best seller in this sector, and the Maestro remained on sale as a cheaper alternative until the last ones left the showrooms in the mid-1990s. The Maestro sold over 605,000 units in total.

Production had peaked at more than 101,000 units in 1983, and as late as 1989 nearly 60,000 were made. Most sales were in the United Kingdom, where it peaked as the sixth best selling car with more than 80,000 sales in 1984, but by 1989 sales had halved and it was the 19th best seller. Production figures fell to 38,762 for 1990, more than halving the following year to 18,450. In 1993, however, production fell to just over 7,000 units and in its final year, 1994, just over 4,000 were produced, the last one rolling off the production line in December.

=== Legacy ===
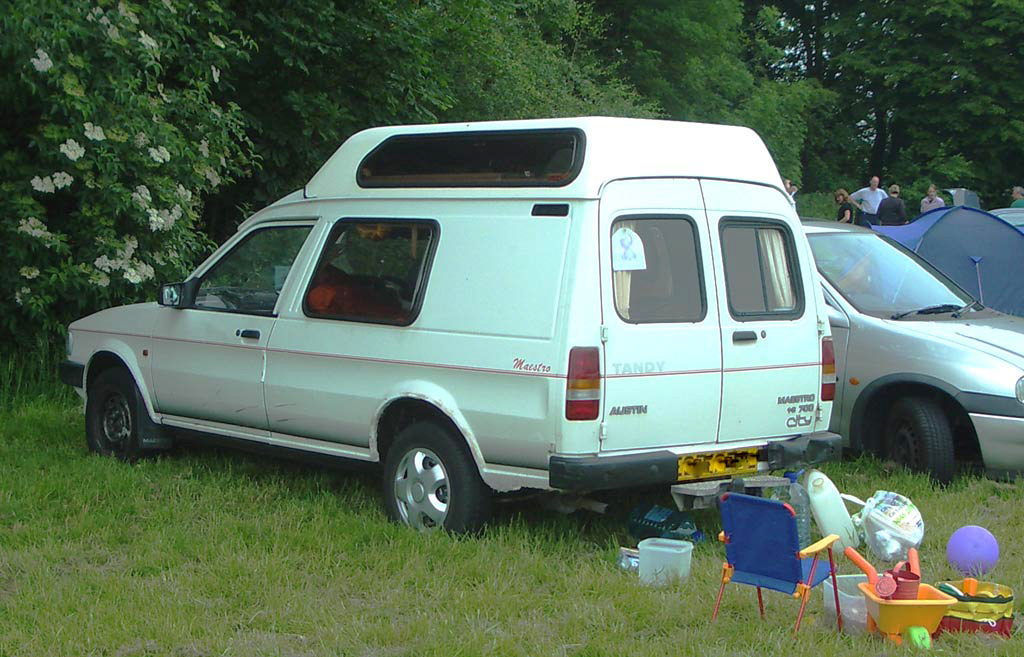
Campervan conversion showing the rear lights as also used by the Land Rover Discover

Many interior parts from the Maestro/Montego series continued to be used in various Land Rover models well into the late 1990s, for instance the Maestro instrument pack and switchgear were fitted to the Range Rover Classic from the mid-1980s onward, as well as on the Series I Discovery from launch until the 1995 facelift. The Series I Discovery also used the tail lamp cluster from the Maestro van until 1998.

A survey by Auto Express magazine, conducted in August 2006, revealed that the Maestro was Britain's ninth most scrapped car of the previous 30 years, with just 11,574 examples still in circulation and in working order in the United Kingdom. By 2009, that number declined to 777 units, and only 116 were still operating in 2023.

== "Rebirth" outside Britain ==
=== Bulgarian production ===
1998-registered Maestro, probably assembled by Parkway Services from a stored kit

In 1994, Rover established Rodacar AD, a joint venture with a Bulgarian company to produce Maestros at a new factory in Varna, using CKD kits sent from the UK. Production began around July 1995 and 2,200 cars were assembled before the factory closed in April 1996. The venture failed because of competition from other cars and the Bulgarian government's failure to honour agreements to reduce tariffs on imported parts and buy thousands of Maestros for government departments. The majority, around 1,700 of the Rodacar-made Maestros, were exported, including 550 to Uruguay, 400 to Argentina and 200 to North Macedonia.

Two British dealers, Parkway Services in Ledbury and a company called Apple 2000 in Bury St Edmunds, acquired unsold Maestros from Bulgaria and sold them in the UK, converting most of them to right-hand drive. Parkway Services purchased a batch of 621 Maestro cars and vans in CKD kit form. These had been stored at Cowley, Oxfordshire, since their production in mid-1996, when they became surplus to requirements. The company built up the cars and converted the majority of them to RHD form using up Rover's supply of parts. The National Database for Motoring Insurance has records of models registered between "R" and "51" number plates, meaning the overall period of Maestro availability, new in the United Kingdom, was from 1983 to 2001. In 1998, the Maestro was relaunched in the British market by Wheeler International Ltd. Sold by Apple 2000 in Bury St Edmunds, Maestros were imported from Bulgaria and sold in the UK, France & Spain, these were the last factory examples available for sale. The last examples were registered in 2001.

=== Chinese production ===
The tooling was then sold to First Automobile Works (FAW) in China, where the Maestro was available to the Chinese motoring market in both hatchback and van models. A new addition to the range was the FAW Lubao CA6410 – a Maestro hatch with a Montego front end. A handful of Chinese-made parts were imported into Britain whilst these cars were in production, which itself ended in 2005.

==== Etsong Lubao QE6400 Ruby and Etsong Lubao QE6440 Laird (1997–2003) ====
In 1997, three years after production of the Maestro ended in the UK, the Chinese tobacco company Etsong acquired the tooling and intellectual property rights to the car. In 2001, the company placed it back into production in two variants; the Etsong Lubao QE6400 Ruby and Etsong Lubao QE6440 Laird, built in a new, specially constructed factory in Qingdao, China. The QE6400 used the hatchback bodyshell of the Maestro, but the frontal styling of the Montego, while the QE6440 was a panel van variant. Both cars used Toyota engines and transmissions.

==== FAW Jiefang CA6400UA (2003–2006) ====
In 2003, Etsong exited the car-making business and sold the Lubao factory to First Automobile Works, one of China's biggest car-makers. FAW continued to market the hatchback as the Jiefang CA6400UA and the van as the Jiefang CA6440UA.

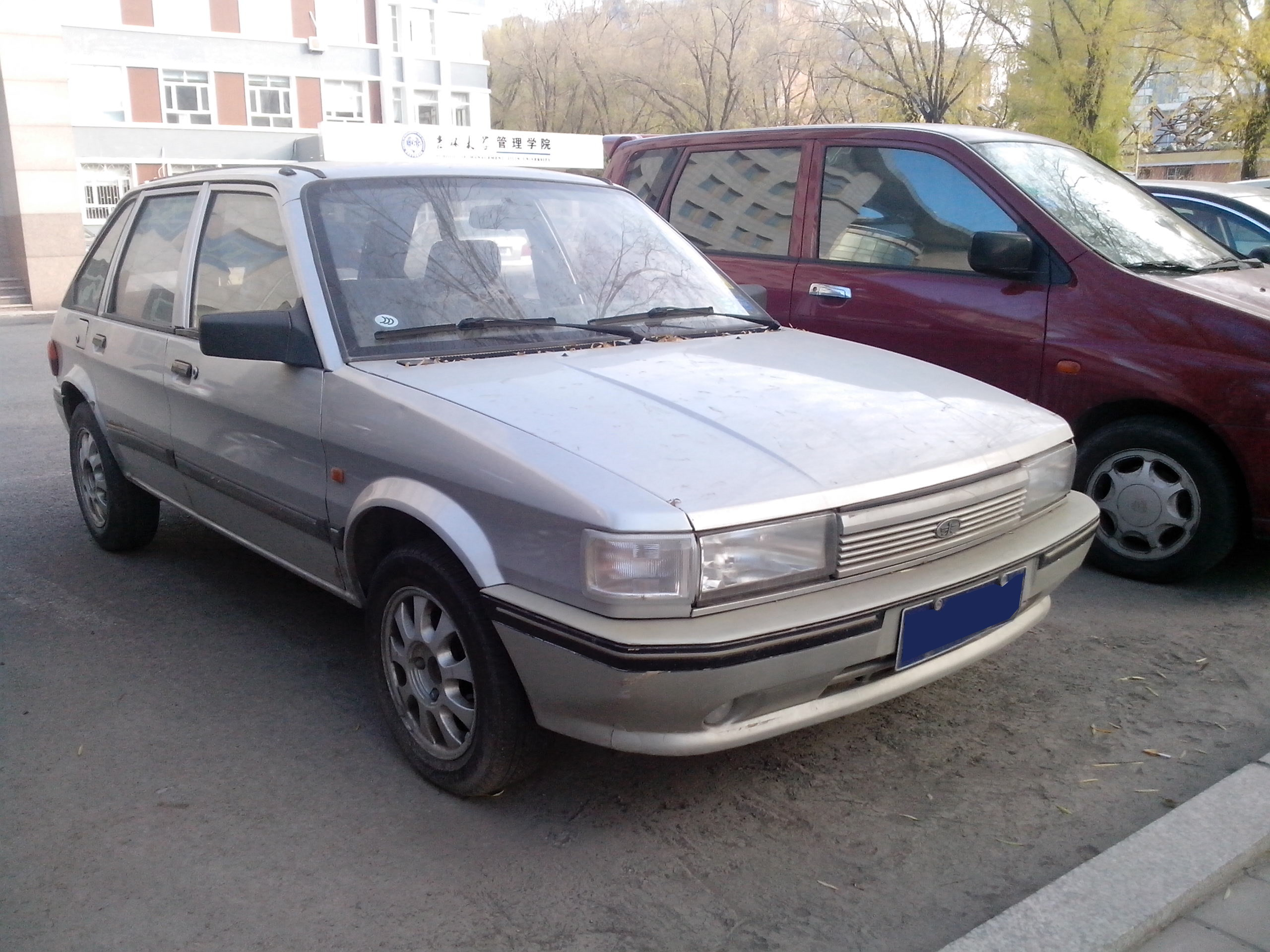
FAW Jiefang CA6400UA

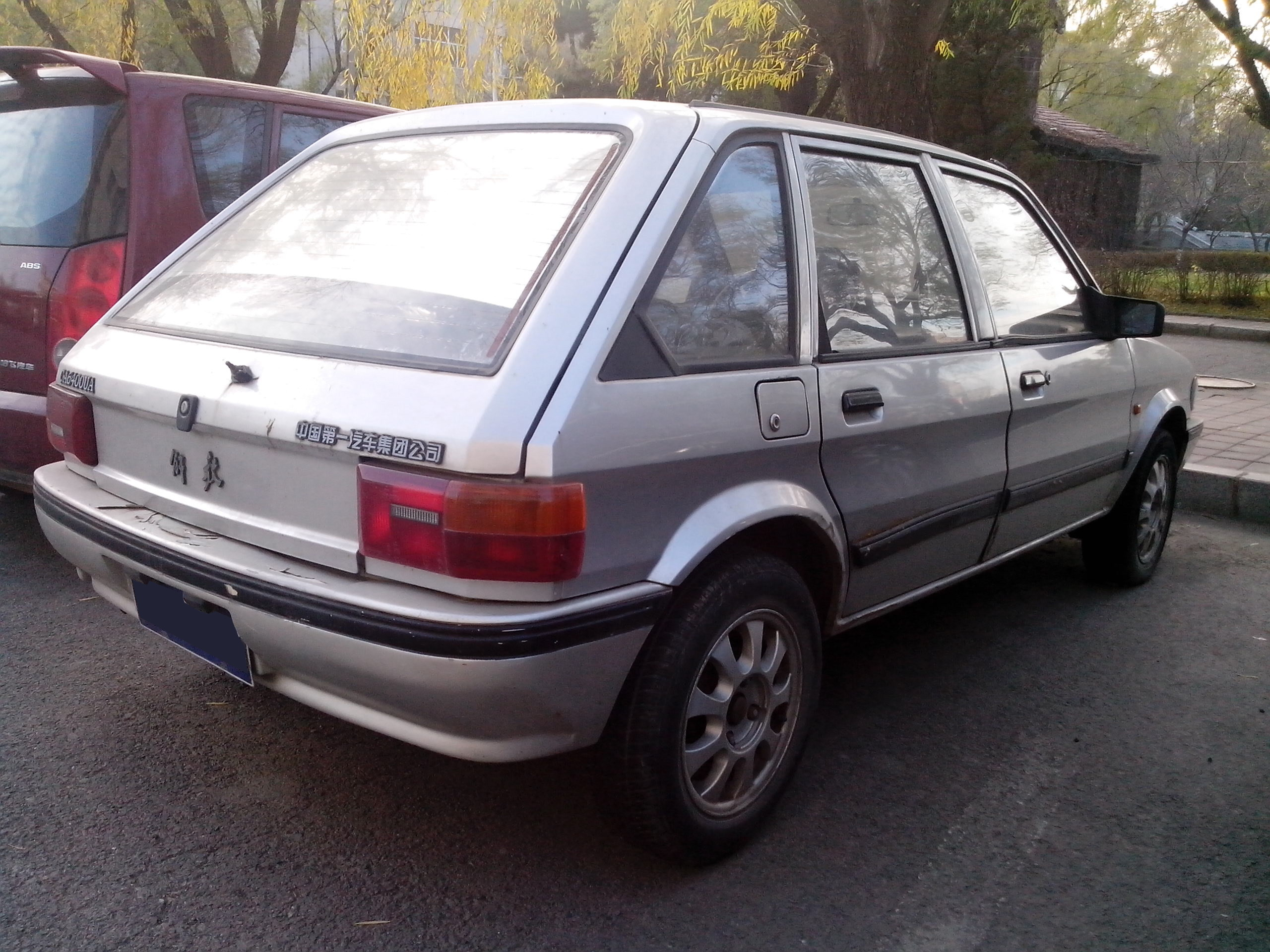
FAW Jiefang CA6400UA rear
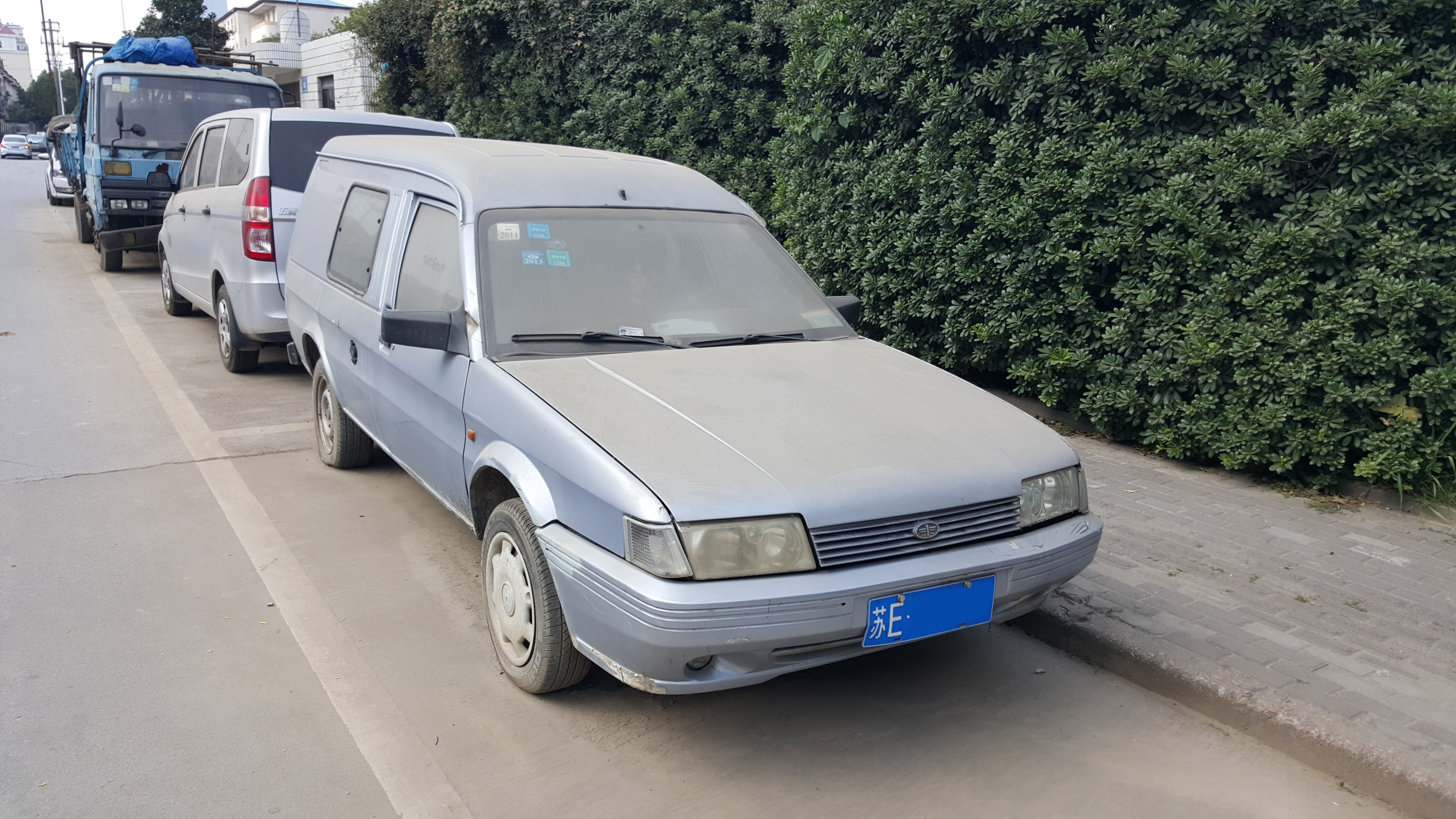
FAW Jiefang CA6400UA facelift

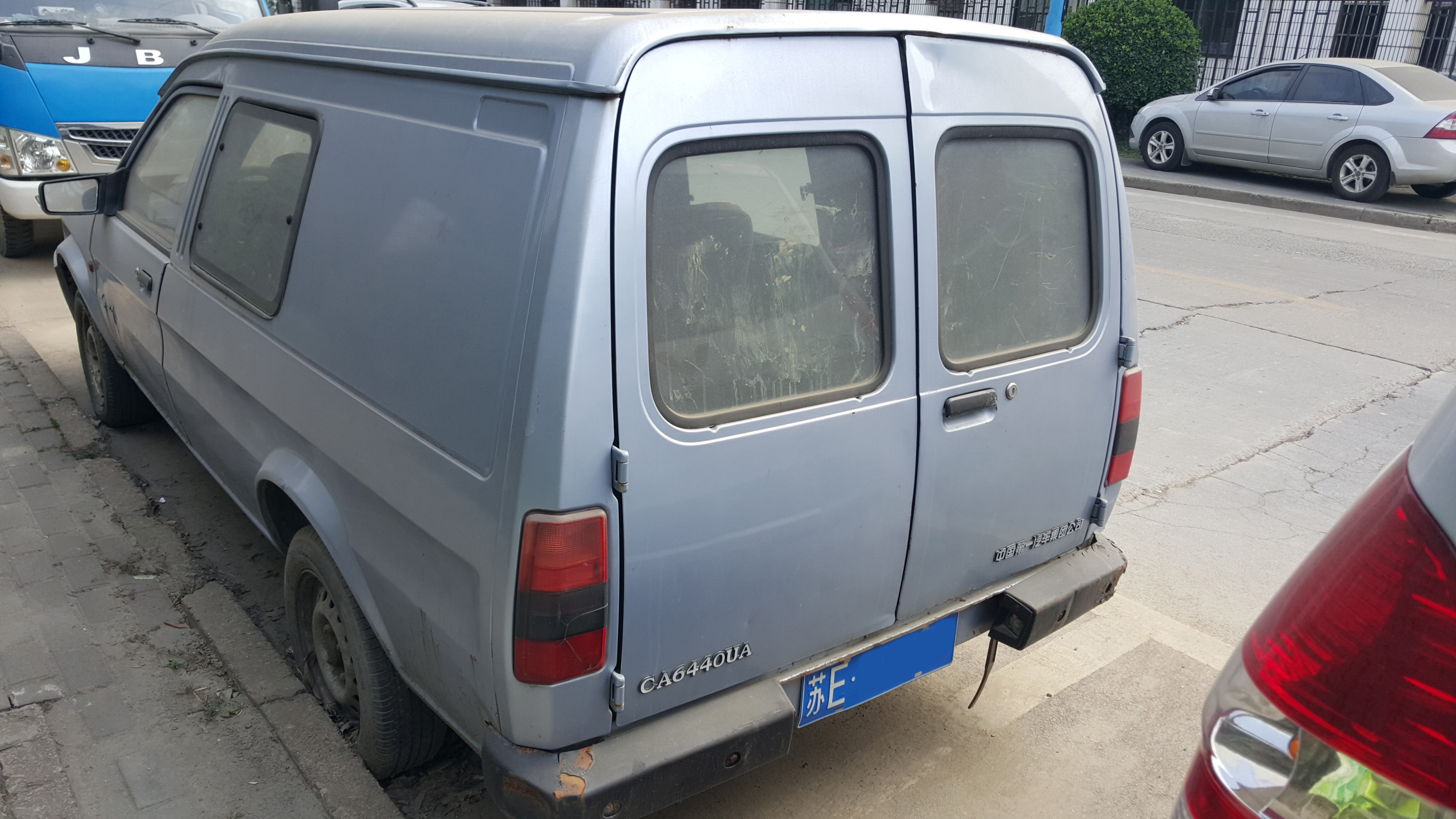
FAW Jiefang CA6400UA faceliftrear

==== Yema SQJ6450N and F series models (2008–2017) ====
Production for the FAW based cars ended in 2006 then in 2008 the Maestro Van was relaunched as the Yema SQJ6450 by Sichuan Auto Industry Group Company Ltd, who had purchased the tooling from FAW. Yema Auto have since reskinned the car and is currently selling SUV-styled wagon versions as the Yema F99, F10, and most recently the F12 (2012).

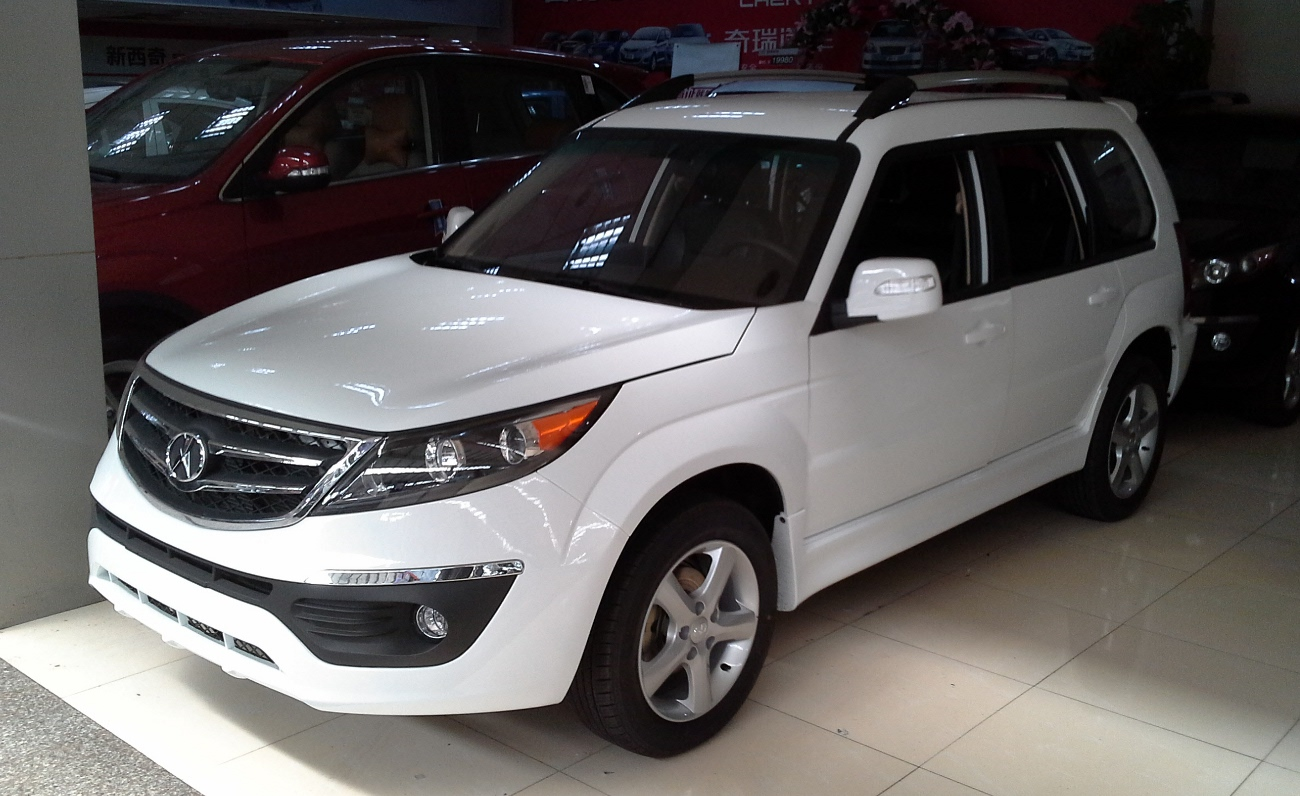
The Yema F12, the most recent development on the old Maestro underpinnings

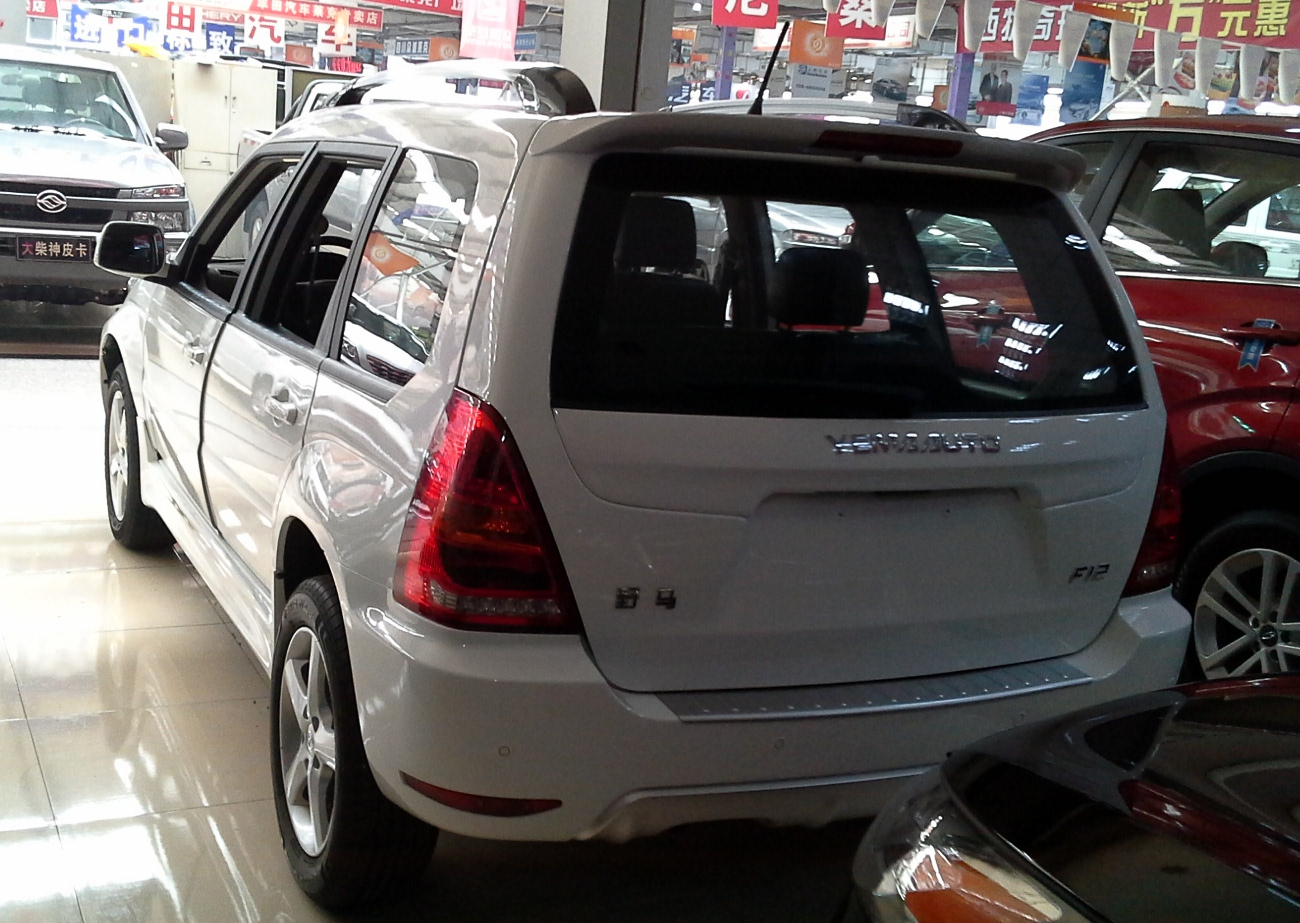
Yema F12 rear

== Powertrains ==
- 1983–1993–1275 cc A-series I4, 68 hp (51 kW) at 5800 rpm and 75 lb·ft (102 Nm) at 3500 rpm
- 1983–1985–1275 cc A-series I4, 64 hp (48 kW) at 5500 rpm and 73 lb·ft (99 Nm) at 3500 rpm HLE
- 1983 – July 1984 – 1598 cc R-series I4, 81 hp (60 kW) at 5500 rpm and 91 lb⋅ft (123 N⋅m) at 3500 rpm
- 1983 – July 1984 – 1598 cc R-series I4, 103 hp (77 kW) at 6000 rpm and 100 lb⋅ft (136 N⋅m) at 4000 rpm MG
- 1984–1993–1598 cc S-series I4, 85 hp (63 kW) at 5600 rpm and 97 lb⋅ft (132 N⋅m) at 3500 rpm
- July 1984 – October 1984 – 1598 cc S-series I4, 103 hp (77 kW) at 6000 rpm MG
- 1984–1992–1994 cc O-series I4, 115 hp (86 kW) MG EFi and 2.0i
- 1988–1990–1994 cc O-series I4, 152 hp (113 kW) MG Turbo
- 1990–1992–1994 cc Austin/Rover MDi – Perkins Prima NA I4, 62 hp (46 kW)
- 1992–1995–1994 cc Austin/Rover MDi – Perkins Prima TD I4, 81 hp (60 kW) at 4500 rpm and 116 lb⋅ft (157 N⋅m) at 2500 rpm

Some prototype versions have a 1.8-litre petrol or Volkswagen's 1.9 diesel engine; these were never used in production.

== Trim levels ==
The Maestro was available in the following trim levels:

- Base (1983–1985)
- L (1983–1990)
- LE (1986–1988)
- HL (1984–1987)
- HLE (1983–1985)
- HLS (1983–1986)
- LX (1990–1993)
- City (1985–1988)
- City X (1985–1988)
- Special (1988–1990)
- Clubman (1990–1994)
- SL (1988–1990)
- Mayfair (1986–1988)
- Vanden Plas (1983–1988)

== In popular culture ==
The Austin and MG Maestro were an early example of product placement on British television and after the car was launched in March 1983, it featured prominently in several TV programmes, including BBCs Tomorrow's World which dedicated a part of a programme to explain how the car was developed and demonstrate the synthesized voice feature. Channel 4's soap opera, Brookside (1982–2003), wrote an entire storyline where the characters, Paul and Annabelle Collins, 'downsized' from their upmarket Rover SD1 for a more basic Austin Maestro. When they were seen looking at a brand new Maestro in a car showroom, prominent advertising surrounding the car declared it "The Magic Maestro!" in episodes aired in March 1983. The (then) state of the art voice command told them the car needed "more fuel". They settled on buying the gold coloured basic trim and not the "computerized version" in the end. Their Maestro had the registration SAB 453Y. It was first registered in March 1983 and written off in June 1994.

Also in 1983, the BBC TV series, Juliet Bravo (1980–1985), the main character, Inspector Kate Longton (Anna Carteret), drove a gold Austin Maestro (registration SOJ 626Y) This was seen in every episode, as well as in the opening titles, from September 1983 - curiously, according to the National Motoring Database records, the Y-registered Austin Maestro Inspector Longton drove was first registered in February 1983 - one month before the car was officially launched.

In 1985, the ITV soap opera Crossroads (1964–1988 series) launched new opening titles which followed a red MG Maestro (with the registration B54 YDE; its first official DVLA registration was June 1985 - these titles first aired in March) from the A38(M) in Birmingham to Crossroads Motel in the fictional village of "Kings Oak". These titles lasted until 1987.

In the BBC TV drama serial, Howards' Way (1985-1990), the character, Tom Howard, drove an MG Maestro during the first series in 1985. Fittingly, his then wife, Jan Howard, drove an Austin Metro.

In 1986, the MG Maestro featured in an episode of the BBC's Sporting Chance with Leslie Ash competing in a motor racing event run by the Silverstone Racing Drivers School.

== Motorsport ==
=== Austin Rover Rallysprint ===
In 1982, and 1983, the MG Maestro was used for the Circuit Race event of the Austin Rover Rallysprint at Donington Park. Tony Pond (1982) and Nigel Mansell (1983) were the overall winners.

=== MG Maestro Challenge ===
A one-make motor racing series, the MG Maestro Challenge, started in 1986 and ran for five seasons.

During the 1987 Season, Gary Brabham and future F1 World Champion Damon Hill made a notable guest appearance at Silverstone. Brabham won with Hill 3rd, though neither were eligible for points.

=== 2 Wheels to 4 Wheels Challenge ===
In 1983, the MG Maestro was used for the 4 wheels event of the 2-4 Challenge at Donington Park.

== Sources ==
- Whisler, Timothy (1999). The British Motor Industry, 1945–94: A Case Study in Industrial Decline. Oxford: Oxford University Press. ISBN 0-19-829074-8.
