= Austin Maxi =

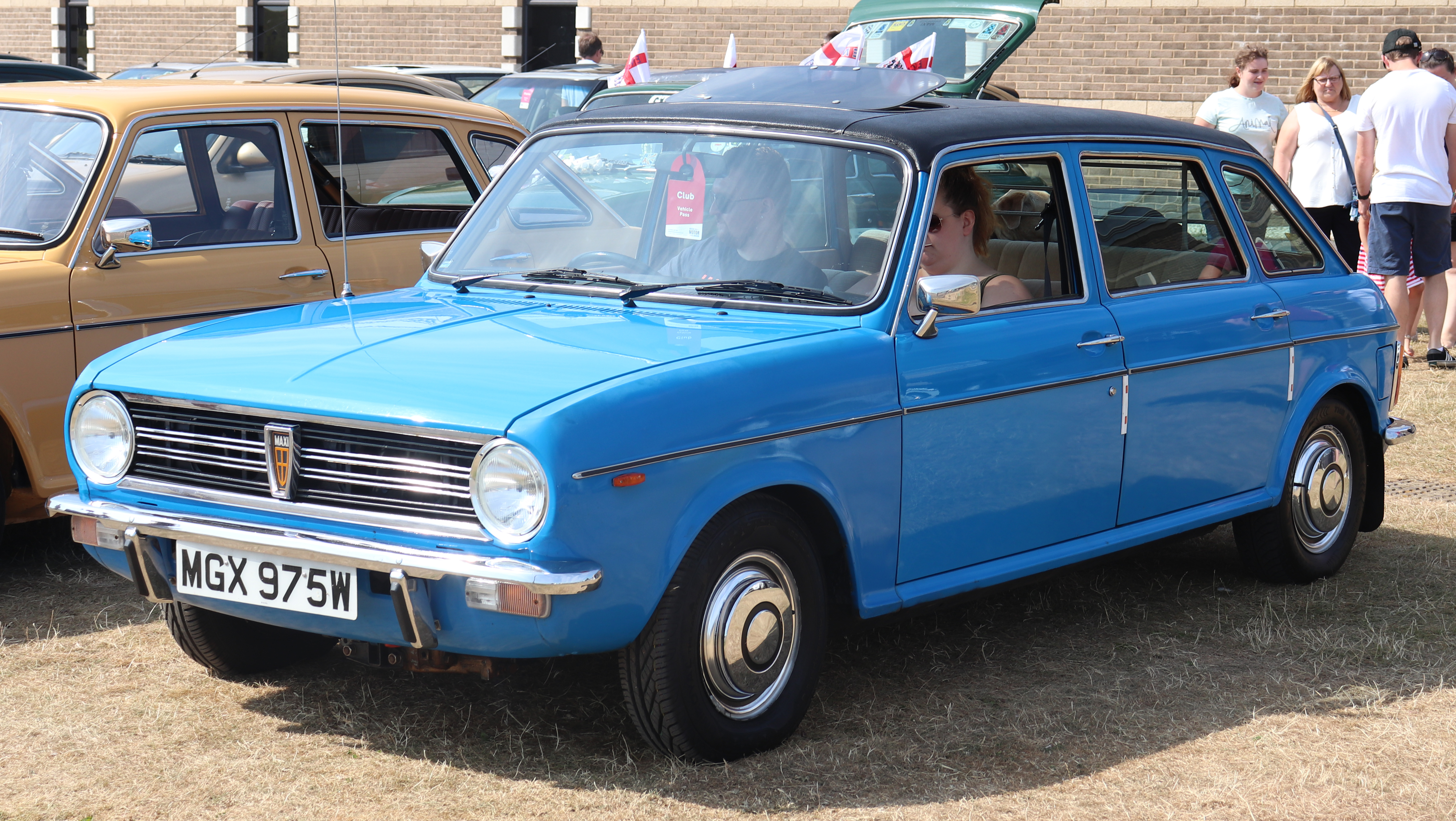
- 1980 BL Maxi MkII 1750 HLS

Overview
- Manufacturer: Austin (British Leyland)
- Also called: Maxi; Leyland Maxi
- Production: May 1969 – July 1981
- Assembly: United Kingdom: Cowley, Oxford, England (Cowley plant); Yugoslavia: Novo Mesto (IMV); New Zealand: Petone (AMI)
- Designer: Sir Alec Issigonis

Body and chassis
- Body style: 5-door hatchback

Powertrain
- Engine: 1485 cc E-Series I4; 1748 cc E-Series I4
- Transmission: 5-speed manual all-synchromesh 4-speed automatic (optional from 1974)

Dimensions
- Wheelbase: 104.75 in (2,661 mm)
- Length: 159 in (4,039 mm)
- Width: 64 in (1,626 mm)
- Height: 54.5 in (1,384 mm)
- Kerb weight: 2,156 lb (978 kg)

Chronology
- Predecessor: Austin A60 Cambridge
- Successor: Austin Maestro

The Austin Maxi is a medium-sized, 5-door hatchback family car that was produced by Austin and later British Leyland between 1969 and 1981.

Despite its practical design and space efficiency, the Maxi never came close to reaching its projected sales targets. 450,297 Maxis were built over a 12-year period. BL management decisions involving the Maxi had significant knock-on effects to the rest of the car line-up. BL marketing decreed that the Maxi should be the only car in the range to feature a hatchback. This stance prevented the Austin Allegro and Princess models gaining hatchbacks despite those designs being capable of receiving them.

== History ==
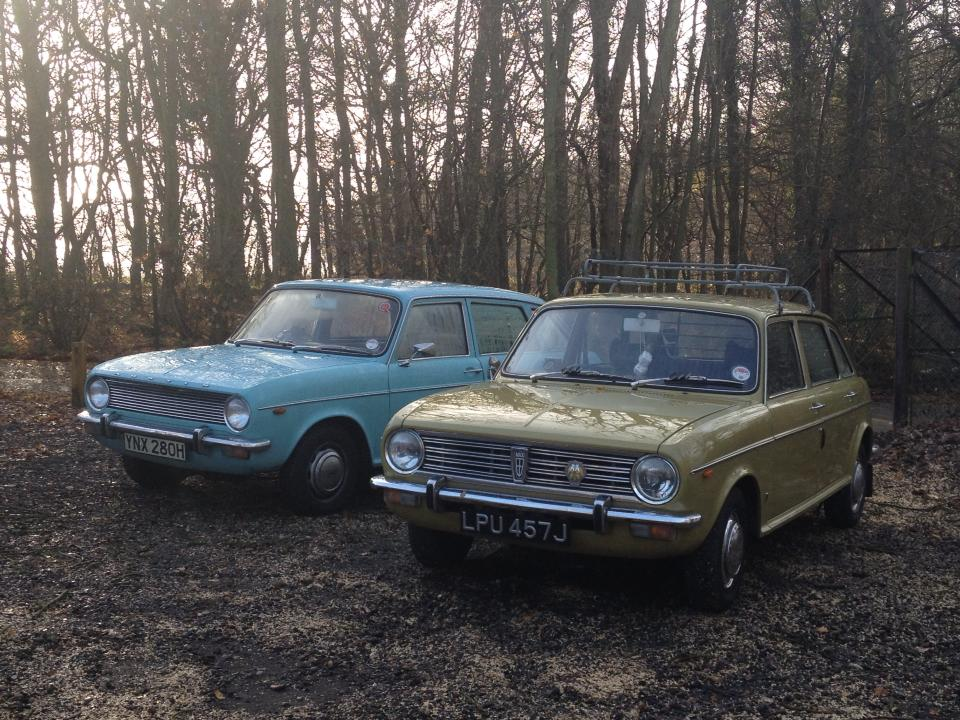
Austin Maxi MkI (left) and MkII (right)

The Maxi (code name ADO14) was the last car designed under the British Motor Corporation (BMC) before it was incorporated into the new British Leyland group, and the last production car designed by famed designer Alec Issigonis. It was the first car to be launched by British Leyland.

Originally, under BMC's plan for its new model range, which it had been developing since 1965, the Maxi was to have been called the "Austin 1500" on its spring 1969 launch, and a saloon version the "Morris 1500" was to follow in the autumn. However, upon the merger of BMC and Leyland the new management abandoned the four-door saloon notchback and developed the Morris Marina instead. The Marina, launched in April 1971, was a rear-wheel drive car available as a saloon, coupe or estate.

The new chairman Lord Stokes decided to also change the hatchback's name to the Maxi in homage to the Mini of 10 years earlier. All Maxis were produced at the Cowley plant in Oxford, although the E-Series engines were made at a new factory at Cofton Hackett neighbouring Longbridge.

The Maxi was launched in Oporto, Portugal, on 24 April 1969, in a blaze of publicity; it was one of the first cars to appear on the BBC's new car programme Wheelbase.

Underneath the Maxi's practical and spacious bodyshell lay an all-new front-wheel drive chassis, which was interlinked with an innovative five-speed manual transmission; the fifth gear was another rarity on family cars in 1969 and one which many manufacturers did not adopt until more than a decade later. The gear selector suffered from notorious problems with its control linkage, especially in early models which had a cable-operated linkage prone to cable stretch and other problems. The cable linkage was quickly modified and then replaced by a rod linkage which was less problematic, but by then the car's image was already tarnished. All models were prone to problems brought on by the "cogs in the sump" layout, whereby the gearbox and engine shared a common oil supply. The clutch oil seal was also prone to leakage.

Power came from a 1,485 cc (90.6 cu in), E-Series petrol engine which would later be used in other British Leyland products, such as the Austin Allegro. The 1750 and twin-carburettor 1750 HL models, added to the range in 1971, offered good performance by the standards of the era, with a top speed of 97 mph (156 km/h), while the smaller-engine version could exceed 90 mph (145 km/h).

Despite the new platform, the Maxi's styling suffered from the decision to save tooling costs by re-using door panels from the Austin 1800 "Landcrab", which gave the Maxi an unusually long wheelbase in relation to its length, coupled with the fact that the carried-over doors made the Maxi resemble a scaled down version of the 1800 (and the Austin 3-Litre, which also used the same doors). This design was by then five years old, at a time when curvaceous American-inspired "coke bottle" styling (typified by contemporaries such as the Ford Cortina Mk III and Hillman Avenger) was very much in vogue, contrasting sharply with the Maxi's obviously mid-1960s looks. Another styling ambition for the car was a four-door saloon version, to compete directly with the Ford Cortina. A prototype was built, badged as a Morris, but it was not put into production, since the booted extension made the Maxi almost the same size as the 1800 model, which was itself replaced in March 1975 by the 18-22 series models (renamed the Princess soon after its launch). Also worthy of note is that the Maxi was voted the least stolen car in 1971 and 1972.

In Australia, owing to recently increased local content assembly tariffs which would have resulted in the Maxi being uneconomic to build, Leyland Motor Corporation of Australia developed in the UK the Morris Nomad, a hybrid utilizing the Maxi's E-series engine/transmission and rear tailgate, fitted to the Morris 1100 body which was already being assembled in that country. For a short while the Nomad (under the Austin name) was exported to New Zealand and offered alongside the locally assembled Maxi.

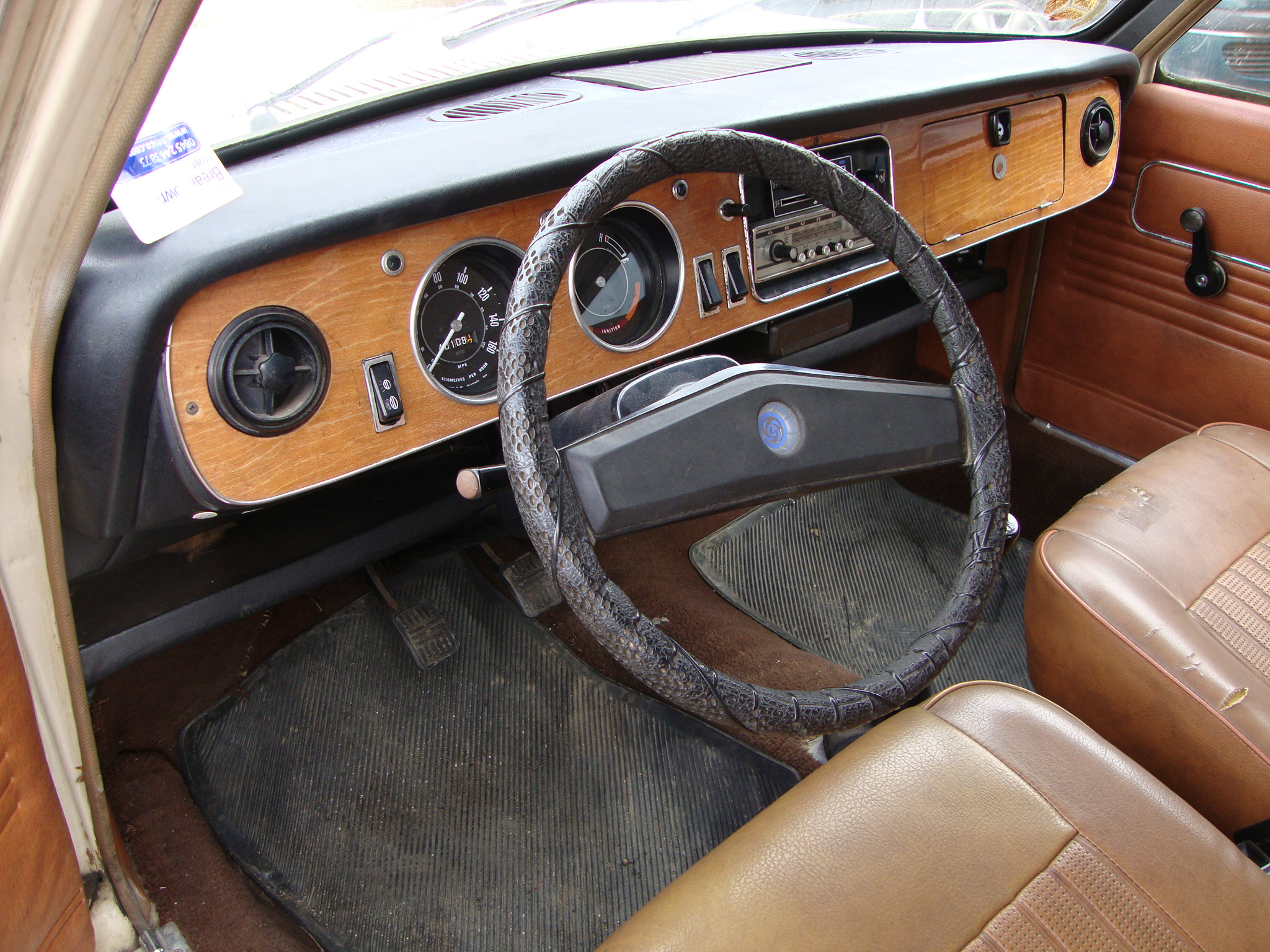
The interior of a left hand drive French model

The Maxi featured a spacious interior, comfortable passenger accommodation, competitive prices and reasonable running costs. It was let down by a dull interior and poor build quality, although it was not as notorious for its failings as the Austin Allegro and Morris Marina were during the 1970s.

The Maxi had several rivals during the 1970s, including the Volkswagen Passat (1973) and Chrysler Alpine (1975), although its best-selling rivals from Ford and Vauxhall did not produce a hatchback until the early 1980s.

One unusual feature of this car was that the rear seat back, as well as folding forward as in a conventional hatchback, also folded back. In combination with fully-reclining front seats, this gave satisfactory, if spartan, sleeping accommodation.

Towards the end of the Maxi's life, in 1980, a lightly revised model was marketed as the "Maxi 2", although by now sales were declining and a new car to succeed the Allegro and Maxi was being developed. Its launch was delayed by the extra investment required to develop the Austin Metro, launched in October 1980.

=== End of production ===
On 8 July 1981, the Austin Maxi's 12-year production run came to an end. Its replacement, the Austin Maestro, which also replaced the smaller Allegro, was introduced in March 1983. Shortly after the Maxi's demise, BL met the demand for a larger family hatchback by revamping the Princess and renaming it the Austin Ambassador, although this was a short-lived model which only lasted until 1984, when the Austin Montego was launched. This completed BL's rationalisation, as it now had just one model competing in this market sector, whereas the Maxi had been one of three designs competing in a sector of the market which had been led by the Ford Cortina.

The Maxi production lines at Cowley were taken over by production of the Triumph Acclaim, which was launched in October 1981. BL management decisions involving the Maxi not only forced the design to be larger than intended, so as to use the 1800/2200's doors, but also had significant knock-on effects on the rest of the car line-up: BL marketing decreed that the Maxi should be the only car in the range to feature a hatchback. This stance prevented the Austin Allegro and Princess models gaining hatchbacks despite those designs being capable of receiving them. The policy was discontinued with the arrival of the Rover SD1 in 1976, and the fast-growing popularity of hatchbacks during the 1970s and 1980s saw British Leyland launch a raft of new hatchback models. The Austin Metro, launched in 1980, was only available as a hatchback, as was the 1983 Austin Maestro.

== Popular culture ==
On 1 July 1969, John Lennon crashed a white Maxi on the single-track A838 road near Loch Eriboll in the Highlands of Scotland. He was on his way to visit his cousin in Durness with Yoko Ono, his son Julian and Yoko's daughter Kyoko. They had set off from Tittenhurst Park, his home near Ascot, in his Mini Cooper, however it soon became apparent that it was too small for them to drive all the way to Scotland, so they stayed overnight at his relatives' home in Liverpool. From there, he rang Apple Records and arranged for a driver to bring the "staff" car; a recently acquired Snowberry White Austin Maxi registered RLA 888G. It featured a full-length white webasto roof and also had a silver apple mounted on the radio speaker top of the front fascia. The following morning, Ono and Lennon transferred all of their luggage over to the Maxi and the four set off north again to Northern Scotland.

Whilst driving along the narrow A838 road, Lennon panicked when he saw another car approaching him and sent the Maxi headlong into a ditch. While the children escaped relatively unhurt, Lennon received a gash to his forehead and Ono injured her back, resulting in a hospital stay in Golspie's Lawson Memorial Hospital for five days. After they returned, Lennon arranged for the Maxi to be placed on a plinth outside his Tittenhurst Park home as an homage to their luck. John Lennon also had the Maxi's steering wheel removed and hung up in the house's billiards room. When Lennon and Ono left the UK for the United States, Lennon sold Tittenhurst to friend and former bandmate Ringo Starr who had the Maxi scrapped. In October 2016, James Walshe, the deputy editor of Practical Classics car magazine retraced Lennon's journey in his 1969 Maxi. The feature later received a top award as 'Best Feature' at the 2017 Bauer Awards.

In 1972, a married couple escaped East Berlin at Checkpoint Charlie in the back of a Maxi. Once over into the western sector, the British Royal Military Police and the West German Polizei were so surprised that two people could fit into a Maxi's boot, that it was then taken up by Leyland West Germany and re-created in a television advert shown across West Germany, Switzerland and Austria.

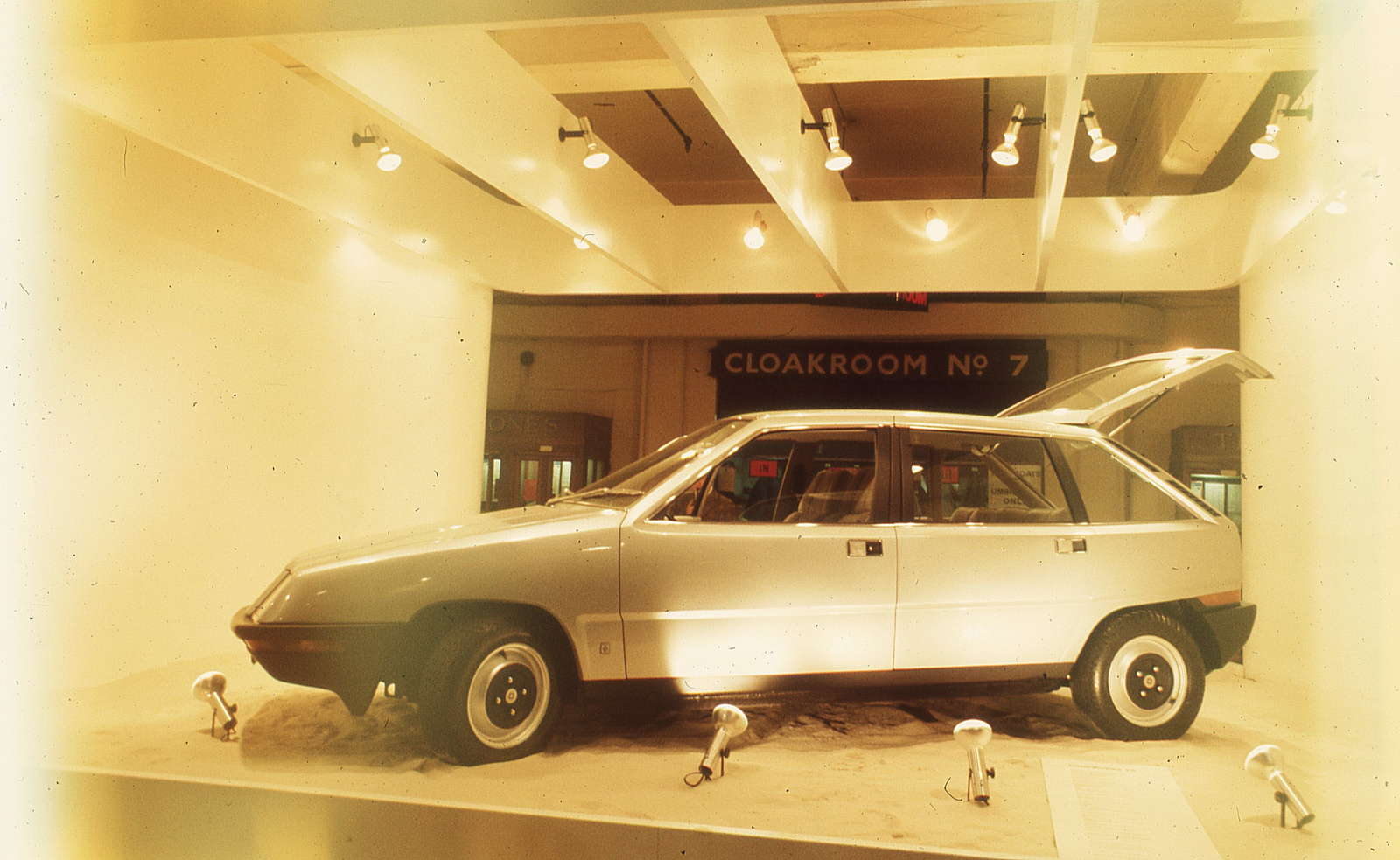
Maxi based Aquila at 1973 Motor Show

Also in 1972, at the Earl's Court Motor Show a competition was staged by The Daily Telegraph, the Institute of British Coachbuilders and Motor Manufactures (later incorporated into the Society of Motor Manufacturers and Traders) to design a futuristic concept car based on a Maxi. The winning design was by a young designer, Chris Field, and the prize was to have his design on paper turned into reality. The "Aquila" was constructed by Woodhall Nicolson of Halifax with help from Lucas, Smiths (Motor Accessory Division & Radiomobile) and Triplex. The resultant car was exhibited at the 1973 show and then given to Field.

From 1975–80, British Leyland supplied the Lawn Tennis Association every year with official "Wimbledon" Maxis. These were standard single carburettor 1750s but fitted with HL velour seat trim and extra sound proofing. Afterwards, they were sold through local Surrey dealers as ex-demonstration cars.

The Maxi, grumbled AC/DC singer Brian Johnson, "was like a matchbox on steroids. The only reason you knew it was a car was cos it had a steering wheel. It was the most basic form of frickin' transport! But it could have been worse. My next-door neighbour had a Lada."

== Timeline ==
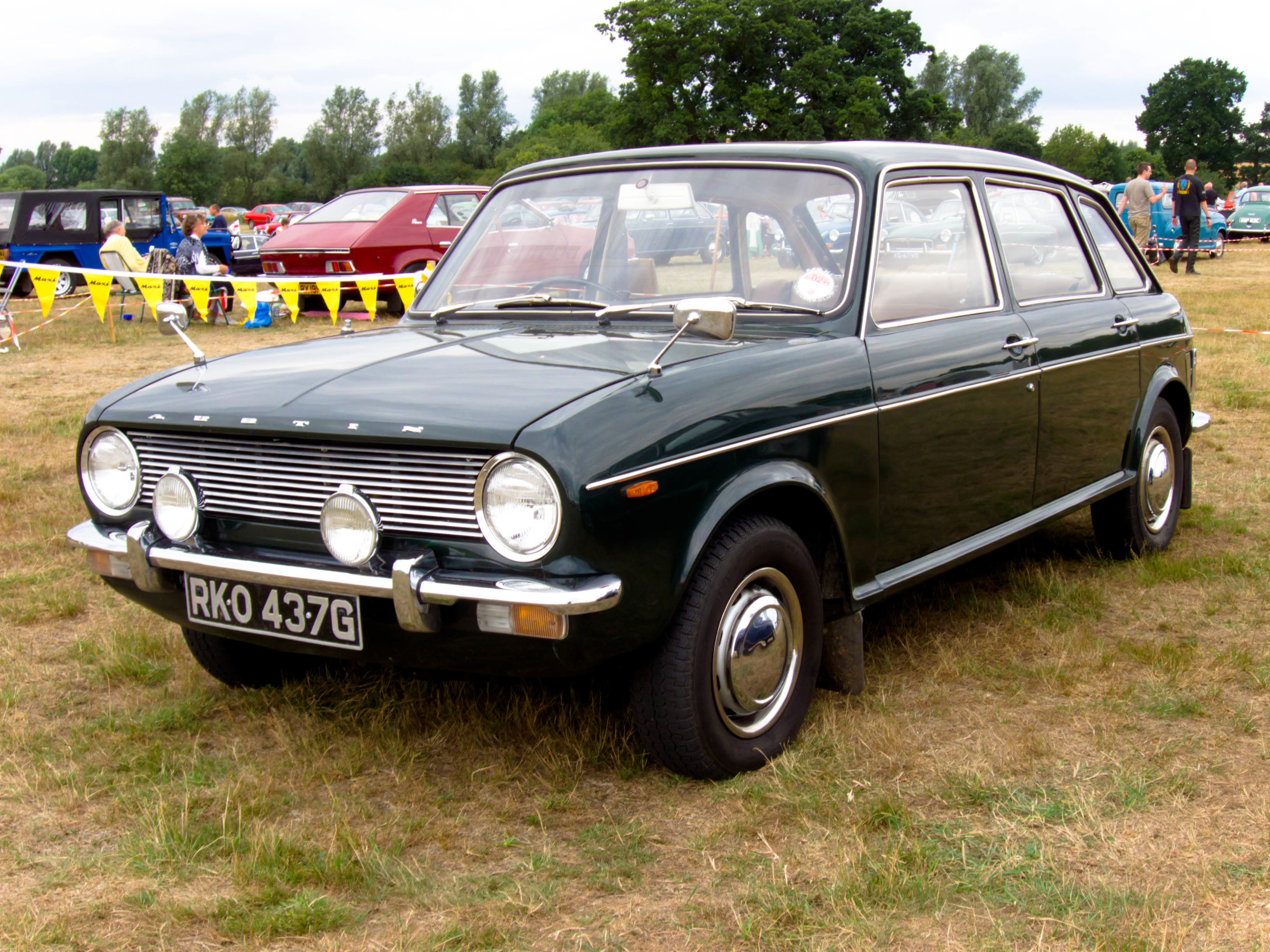
Austin Maxi "cable-change"

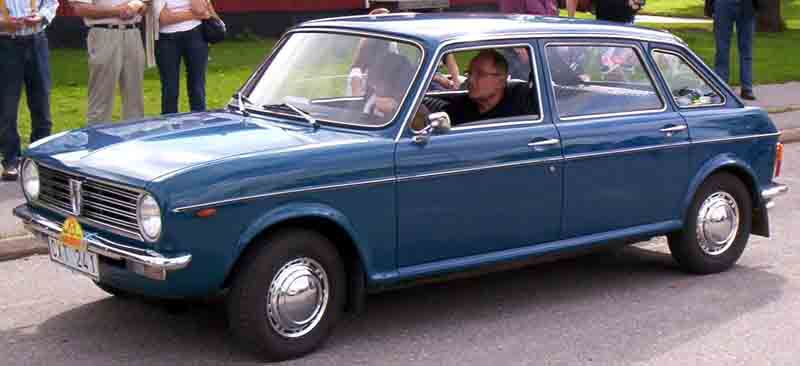
Austin Maxi 1750 (LHD)

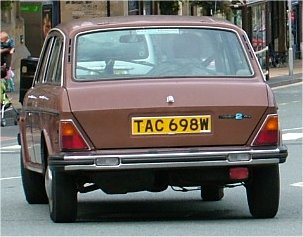
Rear end of the 1980 Maxi 2 L

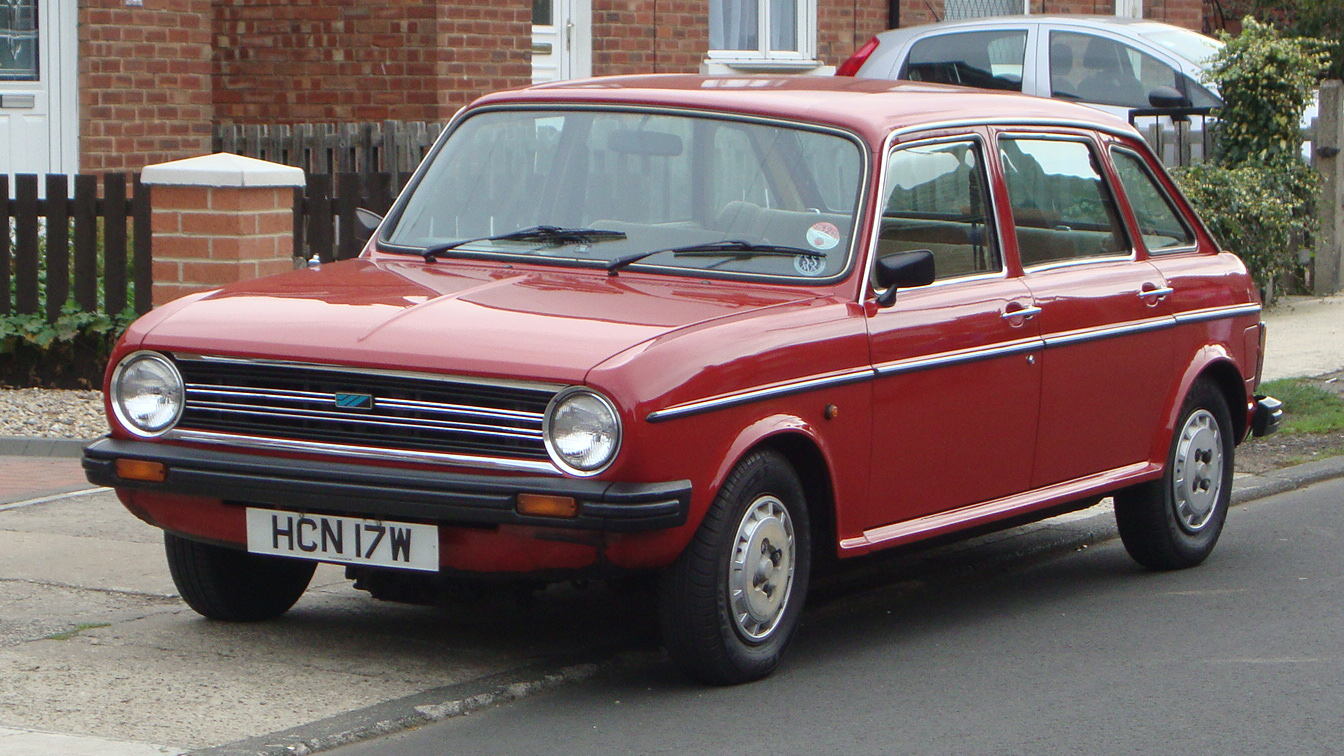
Maxi 2 HL

- May 1969: Introduction of the Austin Maxi 1500 5-door hatchback with transversely-mounted 1485 cc E Series engine and 5-speed manual gearbox driving the front wheels, independent suspension with hydrolastic shock absorbers (often referred to as the "cable-change" models).
- October 1970: Revisions: redesigned front grille with centre badge, bodyside strips, gearchange rods (instead of cables), better sound insulation, new seat facings, all-new veneered wood dash design and smaller steering wheel. Introduction of the Austin Maxi 1750 with larger 1748 cc engine and revisions as for Maxi 1500. Assembly by IMV in Yugoslavia also commenced in 1970.
- 1971: Alternator fitted to all UK models, revised direction indicator circuit, matt finish wood dash, plastic engine shield now black instead of cream. 1750 now has its own gold/yellow chequered grille badge.
- 1972: Introduction of the Austin Maxi 1750 HL, with twin SU HS6 carburettor version of the 1748 cc engine, which gave a higher output of 91 bhp (68 kW) at 5250 rpm. Other additional features for the HL were 165 x 13 radial ply tyres, black grille with chrome upper and lower strips and red "HL" motif, red chequered front badge, front bumper under-riders, chrome exhaust trim, black rimmed hub caps, body coloured mouldings along the sides and rear, electric windscreen washers, 3-spoke alloy steering wheel with leather-bound rim, padded vinyl dashboard, dipping rear view mirror, vanity mirror on passenger sun visor, front door pockets, simulated wooden gear knob and brushed nylon upholstery.
- 1973: Hazard flashers introduced on UK models. In common with the Austin/Morris 1800, body changes to the Maxi simplify production and reduce costs (the A posts are no longer lead loaded).
- 1974: Optional 4-speed automatic transmission available on 1750 and (from May 1979) 1750 HL.
- 1975: Fuel tank enlarged, revisions to the rear squab bed adaption facility. All models now feature cigar lighter and heated rear window as standard.
- 1976: All export LHD models now designated "Maxi HL" with specification similar to UK 1750 HL but without twin carburettor or three-spoke alloy steering wheel.
- 1977: Austin name officially dropped by BL under recommendation by the Ryder Report. Model now officially designated "Maxi". The only noticeable difference was the rear tailgate badge along with the handbooks, so general public and dealers unofficially still called it the same name. Dual circuit brakes now fitted to UK spec cars.
- 1978: All models now have Hydragas suspension instead of the Hydrolastic system which required a revised front subframe, and all models now feature electric windscreen washers. The HL loses its three-spoke steering wheel and a walnut finish dash replaces its padded dash.
- May 1979: Introduction of the Maxi 1750 HLS with walnut dash and twin carburettor 91 bhp (68 kW) engine previously restricted to the HL (the HL now with the single carburettor and wood dash). All models now feature the same copper-coloured front grille badge, black wipers and door mirrors, the rear tailgate badge is now below the trim line, also revised illuminated switches, cigar lighter and revised windscreen wiper control instrumentation. The 1500/1750 now have 'Marle' fabric seat facings replacing the previous PVC "basketweave" leatherette. Single rear fog-light now fitted across the range.
- Dec 1979: Maxi 1500 discontinued.
- Aug 1980: Introduction of the Maxi 2 range in 1750 L, 1750 HL and 1750 HLS variants. All models feature revisions including new bumpers incorporating indicators (front) and reversing lights (rear), new side repeaters, full cover plastic wheel trims and broader side moulding inserts. Inside the instrument bezels are now in matt black, the switchgear is again revised, the headlight switch is now on the steering column and there is a choke warning light. The L replaced the previous Base model and added LM/MW push button radio, nylon trim, door bins, laminated windscreen and walnut veneer dashboard. The HL gained intermittent screen wipe, velour seats, tinted glass and extra sound insulation. The HLS gained a burr walnut veneer dashboard. However, LHD export Maxi 2s were still referred to as 'Austin' Maxis in sales literature, only one version being available, the single carburettor HL, though unlike the UK spec cars it did not feature a radio as standard.
- 1981: Chrome bumpers replaced by matt black.

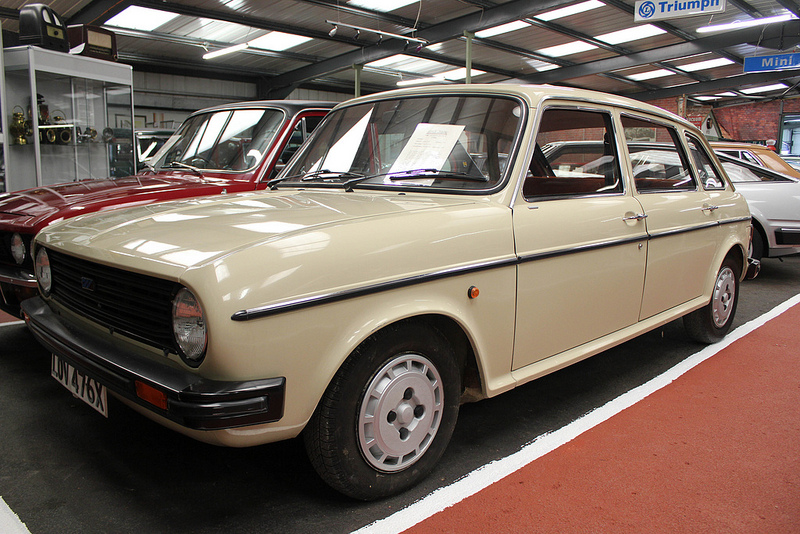
The last Maxi, registered LOV 476X

- July 1981: Last Maxi 2 rolls off production line, its place at Cowley taken by the new Triumph Acclaim. The last Maxi, a champagne L model, is now owned by the British Motor Museum, Gaydon.
