= Rover R8 platform =

Rover 200 Series / Rover 400 Series
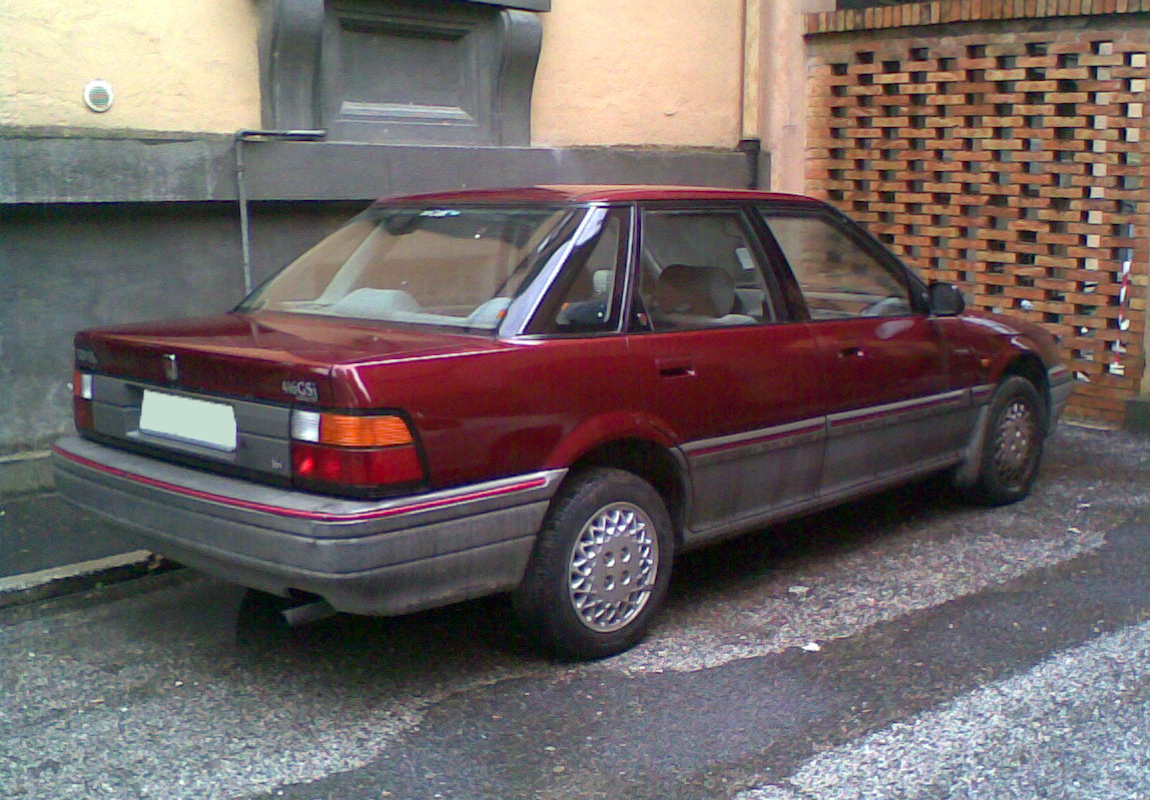
- Mk1 Rover 400 series

Overview
- Manufacturer: Austin Rover Group / Rover Group

Body and chassis
- Class: Compact Car
- Layout: FF layout

The Rover R8 platform was an automobile platform used for the Mark I Rover 200 Series and the Mark II 200 and 400 Series, compact family cars produced by the Austin Rover Group, and later the Rover Group.

The original Rover 200 Series dates back to 1984 with the launch of the SD3 213 and 216 saloons. The second generation was split into two distinct models: the 200 Series three- and five-door hatchbacks, coupé and convertible and 400 Series saloon and estate.

The coupé, convertible and estate models continued after the demise of the hatchback and saloon models, without the 200 or 400 nomenclature, until 1999 as the successor model did not have these particular body styles. They were discontinued with the arrival of the Rover 25 and Rover 45, which were simple facelifts of the current range and not all-new models.

== Rover 200 Mark I (1984–1989) ==
200 Series Mk1
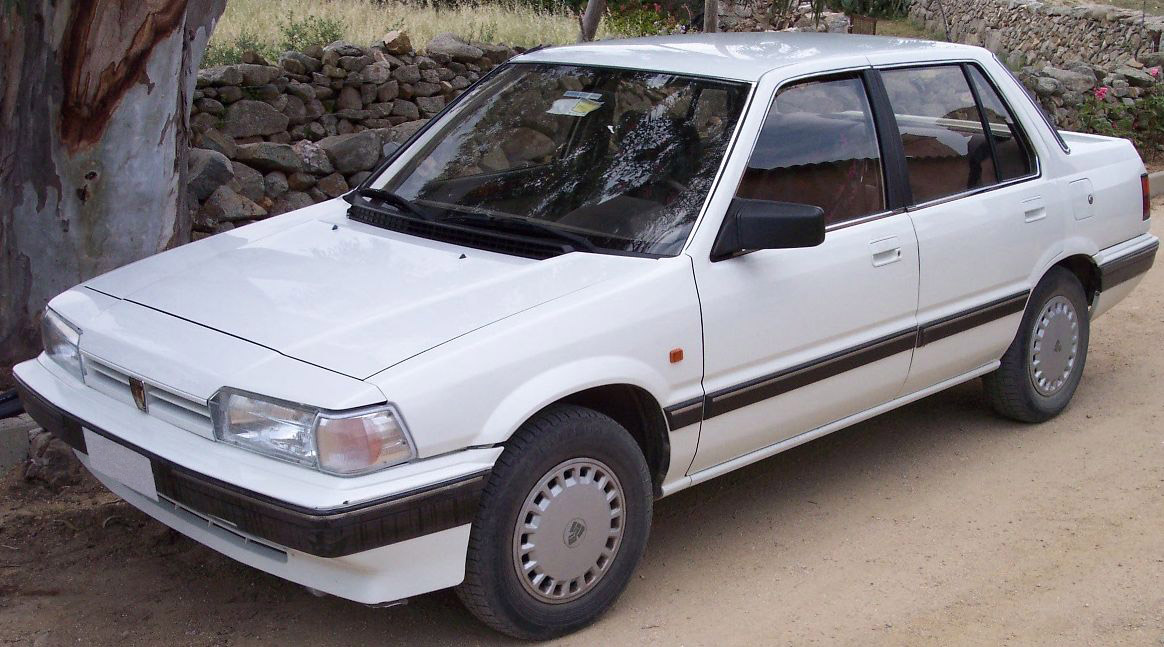
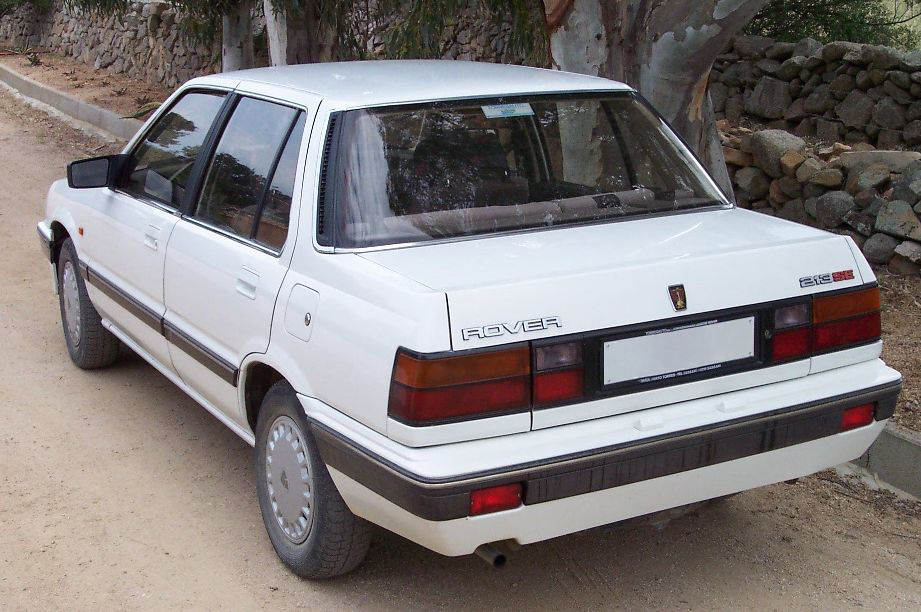

Overview
- Manufacturer: Austin Rover Group
- Production: 1984–1989

Body and chassis
- Body style: 4-door saloon
- Related: Honda Ballade

Powertrain
- Engine: 1.3 L4 Honda E Series Petrol; 1.6 L4 British Leyland S-SeriesPetrol

Chronology
- Predecessor: Triumph Acclaim
- Successor: Rover 200 Series Mk2 / Rover 400 Series Mk1

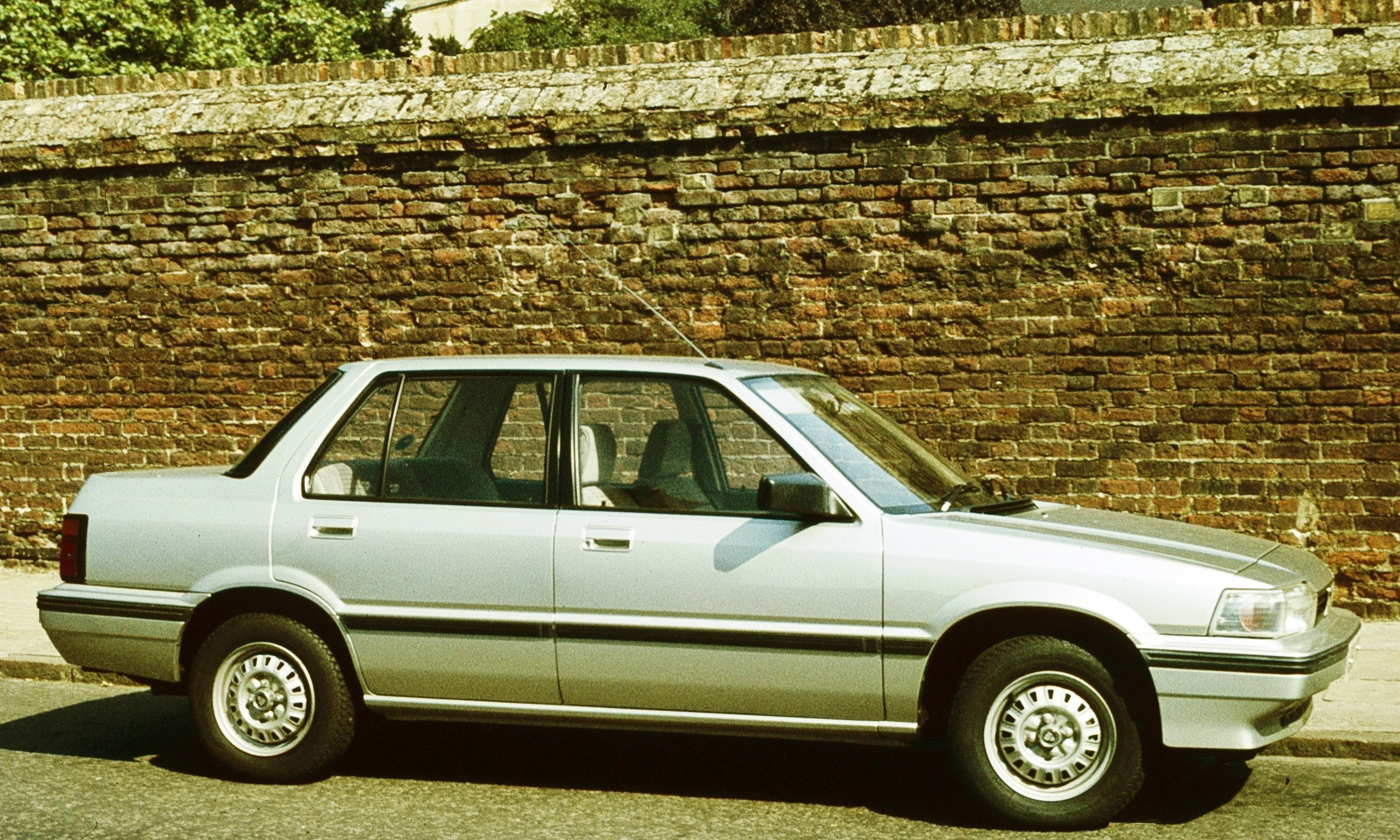
Rover 213 side profile

The original Rover 200 (sometimes referred to by the codename SD3) was the replacement for the earlier Triumph Acclaim, and was the second product of the alliance between British Leyland (BL) and Honda. Only available as a four-door saloon, the 200 series was intended to be more upmarket than the company's Maestro and Montego models, which the 200 Series came in between in terms of size.

Essentially, the 200 series was a British built Honda Ballade, the original design of which had been collaborated upon by both companies. Engines employed were either the Honda Civic derived E series 'EV2' 71 PS (52 kW; 70 bhp) 1.3 litre 12 valve engine, or BL's own S-Series engine in 1.6 litre format (both in 86 PS (63 kW; 85 bhp) carburettor and 103 PS (76 kW; 102 bhp) Lucas EFi form). The resulting cars were badged as either "Rover 213" or "Rover 216".

The 213 used either a Honda five-speed manual gearbox or a Honda three-speed automatic transmission. The British engined 216 also employed a Honda five-speed manual gearbox, unlike the S-Series engine when fitted in the Maestro and Montego. There was also the option of a German ZF four-speed automatic on some 216 models as well.

The Honda badged version was the first Honda car to be built in the United Kingdom (the Honda equivalent of the 200 Series' predecessor, the Triumph Acclaim, was never sold in the UK). Ballade bodyshells, and later complete cars, were made in the Longbridge plant alongside the Rover equivalent, with the Ballade models then going to Honda's new Swindon plant for quality control checks.

This original incarnation of the 200 series was only offered in saloon form. It competed against the likes of the Ford Orion, Vauxhall Belmont, Volkswagen Jetta, Fiat Regata, Volvo 360 and even BMW's 3 Series and the Mercedes-Benz 190. Even as late as the 1980s, small family saloons were still popular in spite of the growing monopoly of hatchbacks in this sector.

This model of car is well known as Richard and Hyacinth Bucket's car in the BBC Television sitcom Keeping up Appearances (1990–1995). Early episodes show a light blue 1987 216S, but later episodes feature a 1989 216SE EFi model (re-badged for continuity as a 216S, and with the same numberplate).

Trim levels (as of July 1989) were:

| Engine & Transmission | S | SE | Vanden Plas | Vitesse |
|---|---|---|---|---|
| 213 – 1.3 L 5 Speed Manual | ✓ | X | X | X |
| 213 – 1.3 L 3 Speed Auto | O | ✓ | X | X |
| 216 – 1.6 L 5 Speed Manual | ✓ | ✓ | ✓ | ✓ |
| 216 – 1.6 L 4 Speed Auto | X | O | O | X |

X = Unavailable ✓ = Available O = Optional

== Rover 200 Mark II and Rover 400 Mark I (1989–1995) ==
200 Series Mk2 / 400 Series Mk1
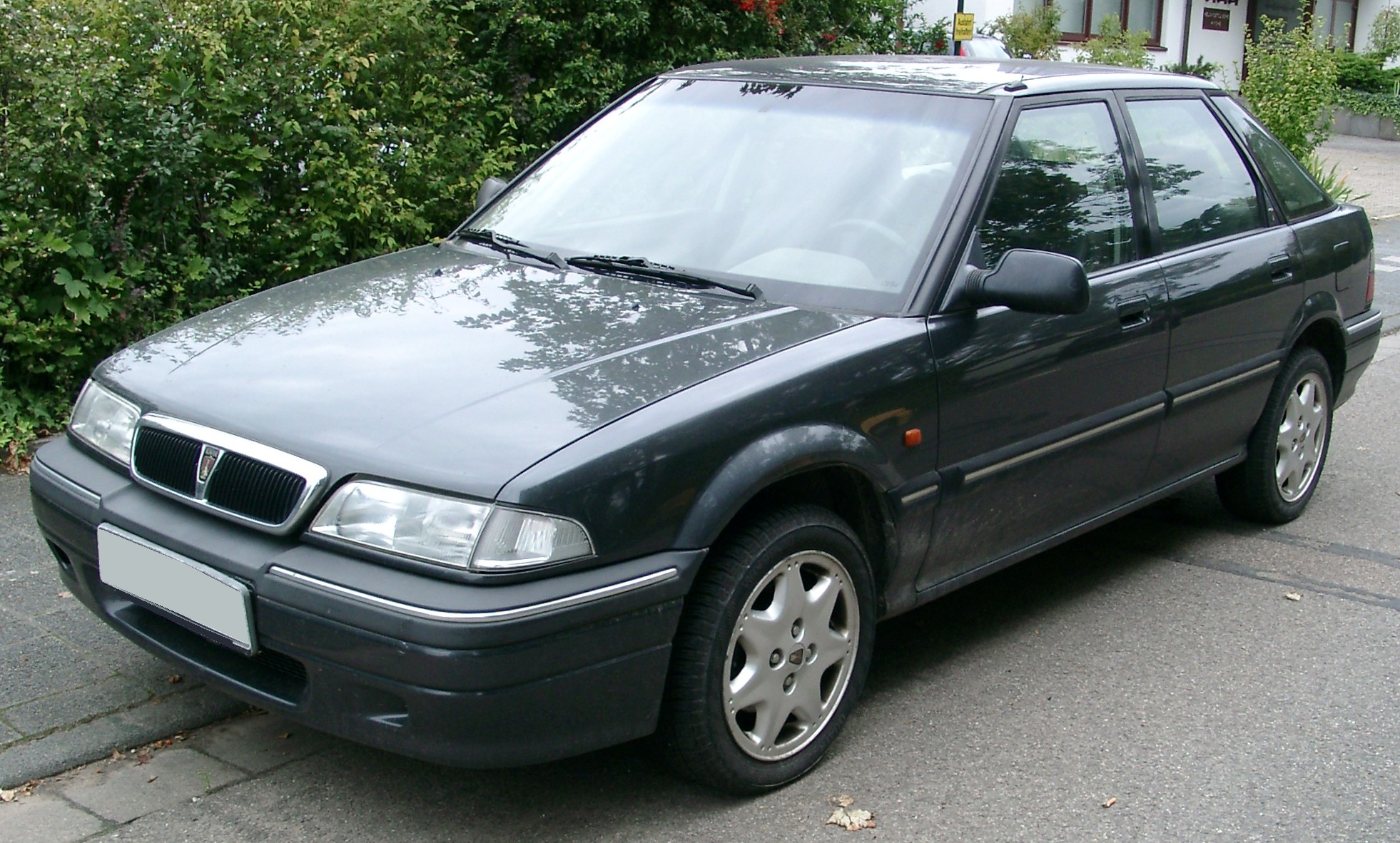
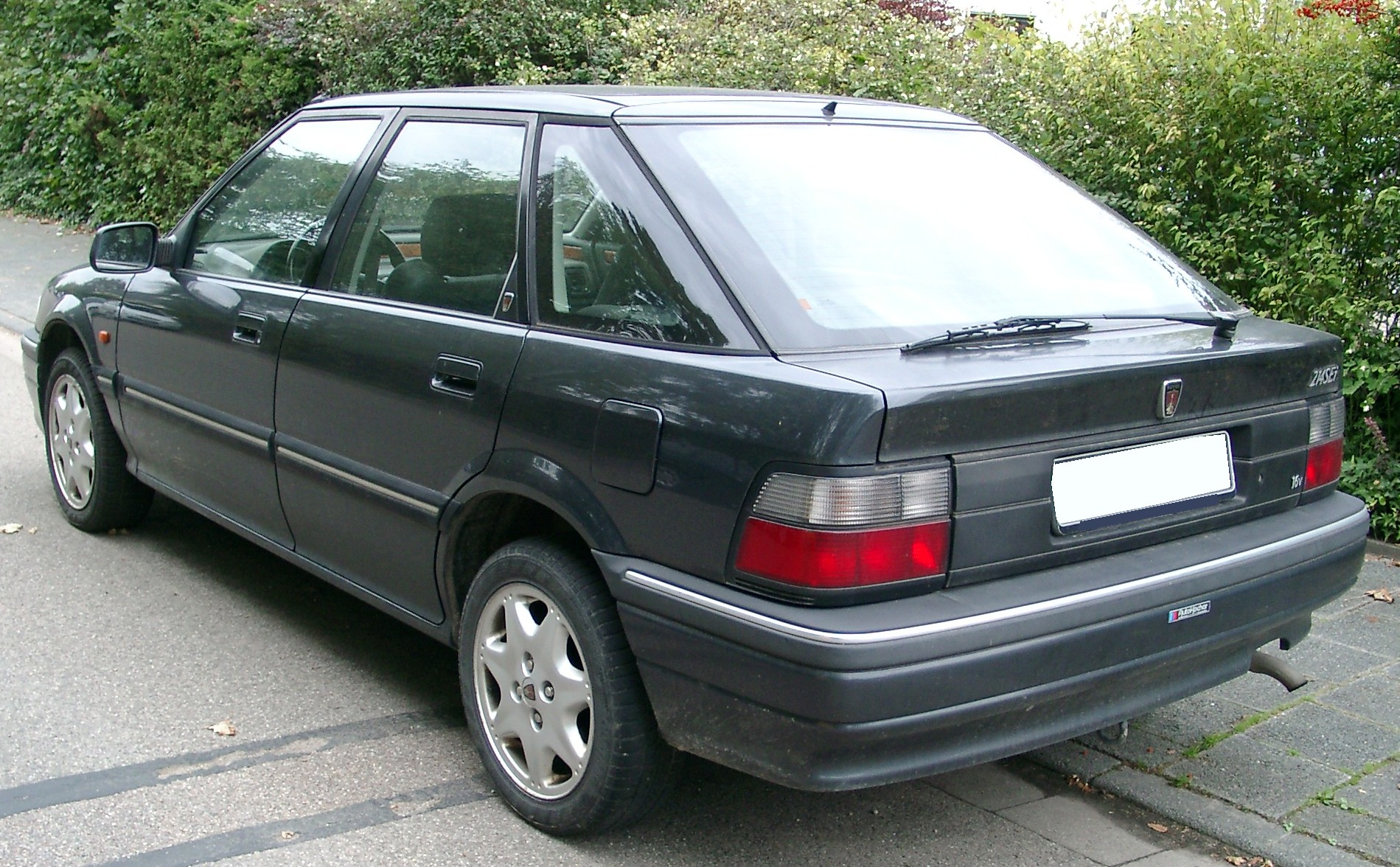

Overview
- Production: 1989–1995

Body and chassis
- Body style: 3-door hatchback 5-door hatchback 2-door coupé 2-door cabriolet 5-door estate 4-door saloon
- Related: Honda Concerto; Rover 200 / 25; Rover 400 / 45; Rover 200 Coupé

Powertrain
- Engine: 1.4 L or 1.6 L K-Series Straight-4; 1.6 L Honda D16A6; 1.6 L Honda D16A8; 2.0 L M-Series Straight-4; 2.0 L T-Series Straight-4; 1.8 L Turbo Diesel Straight-4; 1.9 L NA Diesel Straight-4

Chronology
- Predecessor: Rover 200 Series Mk1
- Successor: Rover 200 / 25; Rover 400 / 45

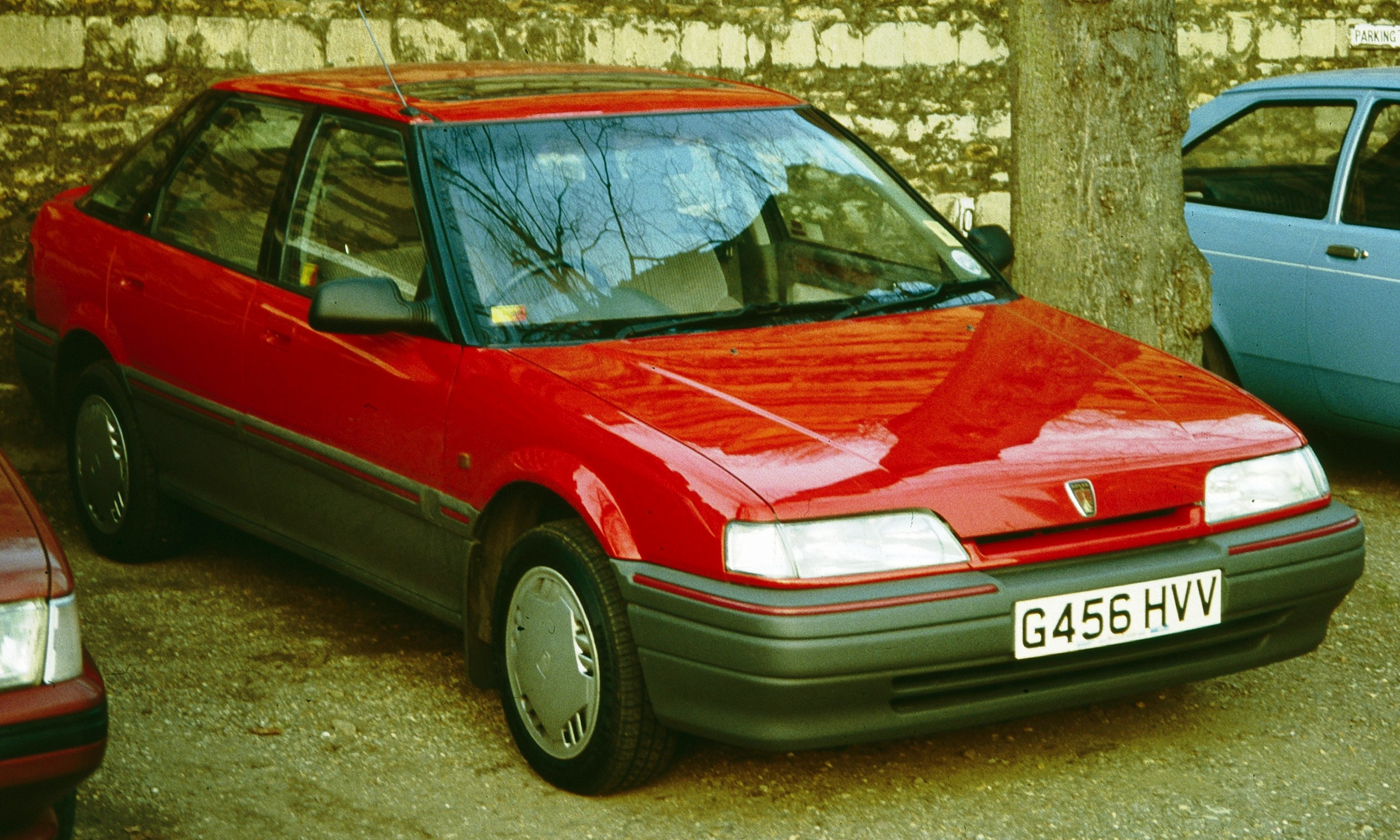
An early Rover 214

This model, codenamed R8, was the first car to be introduced by the newly privatised Rover Group, and was a quantum leap in terms of technology and image placing it as class leader. Once again, the model was designed in collaboration with Honda (who produced the new designed-for-Europe Concerto model) and both models would share production lines at Rover's Longbridge facility. Initially only available as a five-door hatchback, this was the first application of Rover's ground breaking K-Series family of engines (appearing in 1.4 L (1396 cc) twin-cam 16-valve form).

The 1.6 L (1590 cc) version used either a Honda D16A6 SOHC or D16A8 DOHC powerplant, while the 2.0 L M-Series unit from the 800-series followed soon afterwards (1991) in the sportier versions. Later versions used the sturdier Rover T-Series engine, with limited-run turbocharged Rover 220s in GTi and GSi-Turbo trims, boast a very rapid power output of 200 PS (147 kW; 197 bhp) as standard. The Rover-engined models drove the front wheels via jointly developed Peugeot/Rover R65 gearboxes (1.4 litre) and licence built Honda-designed PG1s for the 1.6 and 2.0 litre versions.

Also available were two PSA diesel engines, with the choice of naturally-aspirated 1.9 litre XUD9 or turbo-charged 1.8 XUD7T engines. These were installed instead of the Perkins Prima used in the Austin Maestro and Montego because that engine with its noisy combustion was deemed too unrefined for the new 200.

On its launch, the R8 was in a sector in which many of the competing designs which were at least five years old. For instance, Ford's Escort had been around since 1980 (with a facelift in early 1986) and the Vauxhall Astra was unchanged from its 1984 launch, as was the MK2 Volkswagen Golf from 1983. Its newest major competitors were the Fiat Tipo and Renault 19, both of which had been launched the previous year.

The Rover 200 was produced alongside the Maestro, which continued with a slimmed-down range mostly consisted of budget models, although the faster MG versions continued until 1991.

The 400-series was launched as a saloon in early 1990, it was simply a 200 Series with a four-door body. Like the 200, it was based on the Honda Concerto. It used the same core structure and mechanicals as the Honda, but the rear-end redesign of the glasshouse and body were unique to Rover. Interior trim and electrical architecture were all shared with the contemporary 200. By 1992 a cabriolet (convertible) and three-door hatchback body styles were available. The range was rounded off in 1993 by a coupé and estate ("400 Tourer"). The coupé, cabriolet and estate continued after the rest of the range had been superseded, but without the 200 and 400 tags — known instead as the Rover Coupé, Cabriolet and Tourer respectively, and without Honda power, either; the 1600 cc K-series engine replacing the Honda unit until production ceased in 1999. These models are the most successful Rovers ever made, generating a considerably greater number of sales than the original 200, and the Maestro that it was partially replacing.The 200 Series was the best selling car in Britain for the month of December 1991.

The 200 won What Car? 1990 "Car of the Year"

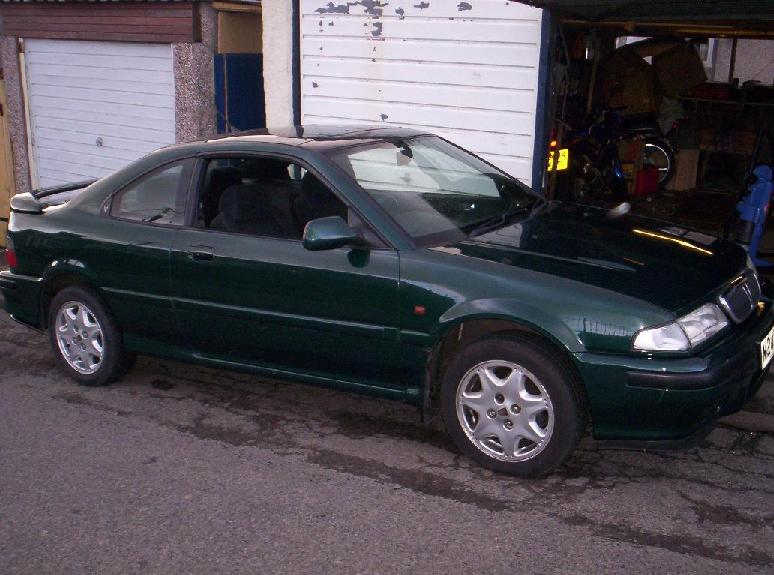
Rover 200 Coupé

The diesel power plant was supplied by PSA Peugeot Citroën in turbodiesel 1.8 litre and normally aspirated 1.9 litre configurations. Petrol Models made first use of the Rover K Series engine (along with the MkII 200) in 1.4 litre form. 1.6 litre models were powered by the Honda D series engine in both single-cam and twin-cam versions. 2.0 litre models were powered by the Rover T series engine in both normally aspirated and, in a limited run, turbocharged form giving rapid performance.

A mid-life facelift in 1992 saw the reintroduction of the Rover grille which had appeared on the R17 a major facelift of the Rover 800. This change was achieved without significant change to the remaining structure, but helped reinforce the family look and establish a certain distance from the Honda Concerto, and support the development of a less 'bread and butter' image for the small Rovers especially in southern European markets where sales continued to grow. This design change was a partial answer to criticism that many cars had become very anonymous during the search for better aerodynamics.

The 3- and 5-door 200s were replaced by the R3 Rover 200 and the 4-door 400 by the HH/R Rover 400 in 1995. The R8 Cabriolet, Coupe and Tourer models remained in production, with the addition of the dashboard and powertrains from the R3 200, as they were not replaced by any R3 or HH/R derivative. Production of these 3 '96 Model Year' models finally ended in 1998.
