= R8 =

R8 or R-8 may refer to:

== Transport ==
- Audi R8, used from 1999–2006 by Audi for Le Mans 24 Hours race cars, and from 2007–2024 for a street legal car
  - List of Audi R8 automobiles
- R8 (Rodalies de Catalunya), a commuter rail line bypassing Barcelona, Catalonia, Spain
- R8 (SEPTA), a commuter rail line in Philadelphia, United States, which has been split into:
  - Chestnut Hill West Line, R8 Chestnut Hill West
  - Fox Chase Line, R8 Fox Chase
- R8 (RER Vaud), an S-Bahn line in the Swiss canton of Vaud
- Kyrgyzstan Airlines, from its IATA airline designators
- Radial Road 8 or R-8, an arterial road of Manila, Philippines
- Renault 8, a small family car produced in the 1960s and early 1970s
- R8A (New York City Subway car)
- Rover R8 platform

== Other uses ==
- R8, a machine taper originally designed for Bridgeport Milling Machines
- R8: Contact with combustible material may cause fire, a risk phrase in chemistry
- HK R8, a modified version of the Heckler & Koch SL8 rifle
- Smith & Wesson M&P R8, a version of the Smith & Wesson Model 327 revolver
- HP roman8, an 8-bit character set
- Kaliningrad K-8, a medium-range air-to-air missile known as R-8 in service
- Leica R8, a 1996 manual focus 35 mm single-lens reflex camera
- Canon EOS R8, a mirrorless camera
- Receptor 8, the eighth in line of a series of cellular receptors, generally at the end of an acronym
- Roland R-8, a 1988 electronic drum machine
- USS R-8, a 1919 United States Navy submarine

== See also ==
- R08 (disambiguation)
- 8R (disambiguation)
