= Rover 600 Series =

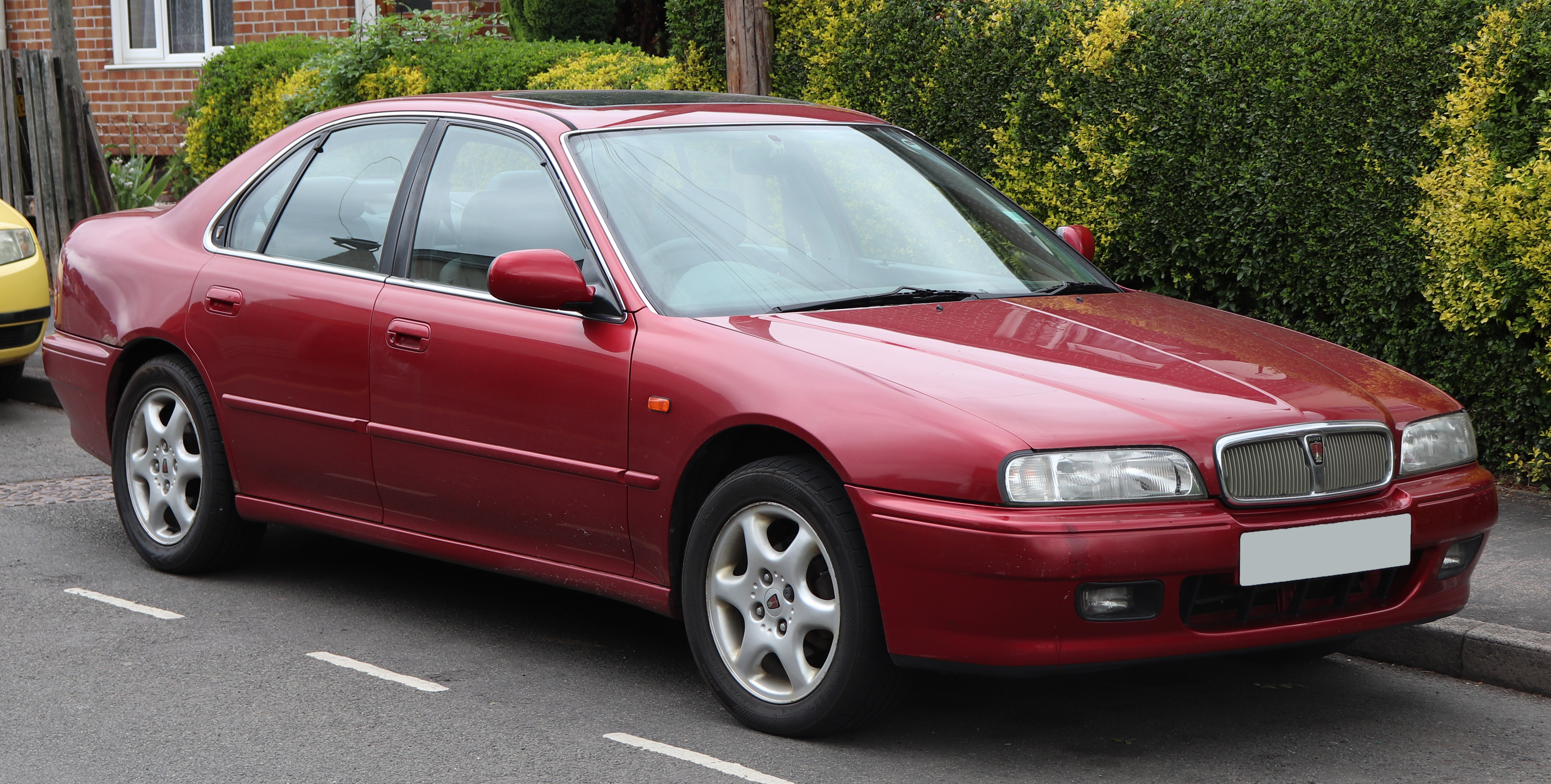

Overview
- Manufacturer: Rover
- Production: April 1993–1999
- Assembly: United Kingdom: Cowley, Oxford, England (Plant Oxford)
- Designer: Richard Woolley (1989)

Body and chassis
- Class: Large family car (D)
- Body style: 4-door saloon
- Layout: FF layout
- Platform: Honda CB
- Related: Honda Accord; Honda Ascot Innova

Powertrain
- Engine: petrol: 1.8 L Honda F18A I4; 2.0 L Honda F20Z1 I4; 2.0 L T-series turbo I4; 2.3 L Honda H23A3 I4; diesel: 2.0 L L-series turbo I4
- Transmission: 5-speed manual 4-speed automatic

Dimensions
- Wheelbase: 2,720 mm (107.1 in)
- Length: 4,650 mm (183.1 in)
- Width: 1,727 mm (68.0 in)
- Height: 1,380 mm (54.3 in)
- Kerb weight: 1,280–1,365 kg (2,822–3,009 lb)

Chronology
- Predecessor: Austin Montego
- Successor: Rover 75

The Rover 600 Series is a compact executive car range that was produced by the British manufacturer Rover from 1993 to 1999.

The exterior of the Rover 600 was designed by Rover, a reskin of the European Honda Accord, also built in the United Kingdom by Honda in Swindon. The core structure and vast majority of the engineering content was sourced from Honda but the vehicles were designed at the same time, with a small Rover team on site in Japan. Colour and trim derivatives were also used to help separate the Rover from the Honda in the marketplace.

The 1.8, 2.0 and 2.3 litre inline-four petrol engines were all provided by Honda. However, the 2.0 litre turbodiesel Rover L-series engine and turbocharged T-series engines were developed by Rover itself, evolutions of units already available elsewhere in the Rover model range.

The 600's interior included wood and chrome trim, as well as relatively high equipment levels, although rear legroom was criticised by Parkers as rather constrained. The interior was similar to the Japanese built Honda Ascot Innova, except with a few cosmetic changes. Carpet was also not evident along the bottom trim of the dashboard, although it did feature there on the Innova.

The Honda derived chassis was reported to give a comfortable but unsporting ride. Given the Rover's equipment, prices were reasonably competitive in the large family car segment, and considerably lower than the price of such compact executive cars, such as the BMW 3 Series and Audi A4. Unlike the Montego, there was never an estate version of the 600 Series, with no direct replacement being launched for the estate version of the Montego when it was discontinued at the end of 1994. An estate would eventually resurface with the Rover 75 Tourer when it was launched in July 2001.

== History ==
Launched on 19 April 1993, the 600 Series replaced the Montego saloon in the Rover range, but because the 600 was positioned considerably further upmarket in relation to its predecessor, the entry-level Montego models were kept in production primarily for the fleet market.

Production continued until the beginning of 1999, when it was replaced with the retro styled Rover 75, developed under BMW's stewardship. The 75 also replaced the larger 800 Series. The 600 had been a popular car in the compact executive sector, with a large percentage of sales being to the fleet market.

In 1984, while in the final stages of developing the Rover 800 series saloon, it was planned to sell the hatchback version from its launch a year later as the Rover 600 Series, but these plans were abandoned and instead the hatchback became part of the 800 Series when it launched in 1988.

=== Development ===
Originally, the Austin Rover Group (ARG) had intended to replace the Montego with the AR16 and AR17 concepts - these were essentially the existing Montego underpinnings and core structure reskinned with new outer body panels to mimic the design language of the Rover 800 (XX) and would have been called the Rover 400-series. AR16 was a saloon, whilst AR17 was to be a hatchback which would compete directly with the Ford Sierra and Vauxhall Cavalier. However, shortly after the restructuring of ARG and its parent company British Leyland into the Rover Group, the plan was cancelled due to a lack of funds and as a stopgap, a facelifted and revised Montego (Project AR9) was released for the 1989 model year.

In June 1989, Rover reached an agreement with Honda (its partner in a venture which had been running since 1980) to produce a new model which would share its base with the next generation Honda Accord, and use Honda's engines. It would be aimed further upmarket than the Montego, competing more directly with the likes of the BMW 3 Series than with the Ford Mondeo, which was launched at around the same time.

Having been unveiled to the motoring press towards the end of 1992, the Rover 600 Series finally went on sale on 19 April 1993, two months before the new Accord on which it was based, although it had been well known within the motoring press that both cars were derived from the Japanese market Ascot Innova which had launched in March 1992, therefore the engineering and interior design elements of both the 600 and European-market Accord were essentially already in the public domain almost a year before their European launch.

Its introduction saw the Montego saloon withdrawn from production after nine years, although production of the estate model continued until the end of the following year.

Rover recalled 21,634 600 Series' built between December 1994 and December 1995 in May 1996, to check a potential steering rack fault.

== Versions ==
The 600 was available in the following versions:

- 618i
- 618 Si
- 620i

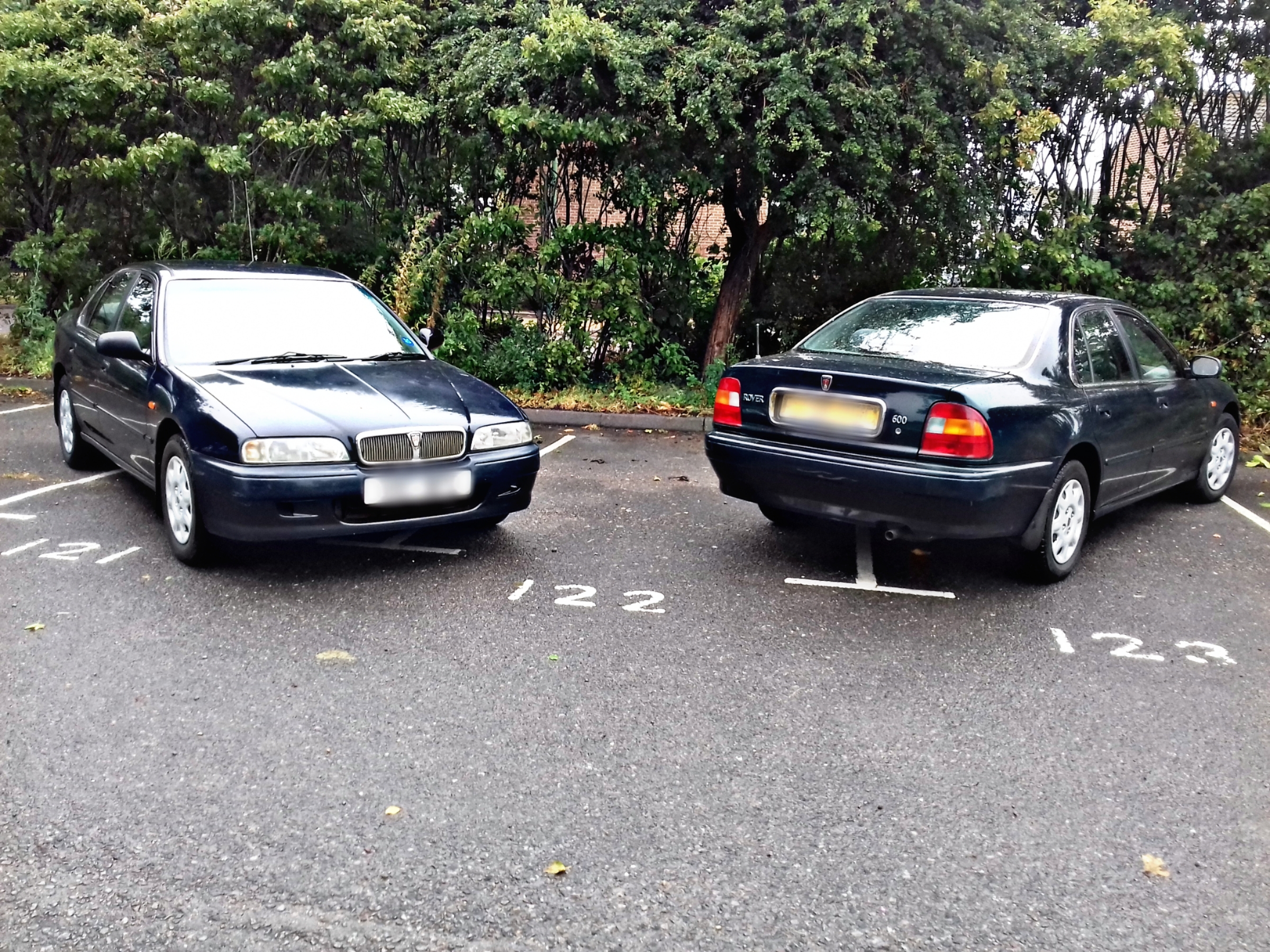
A pair of Midnight Blue Rover 618i.

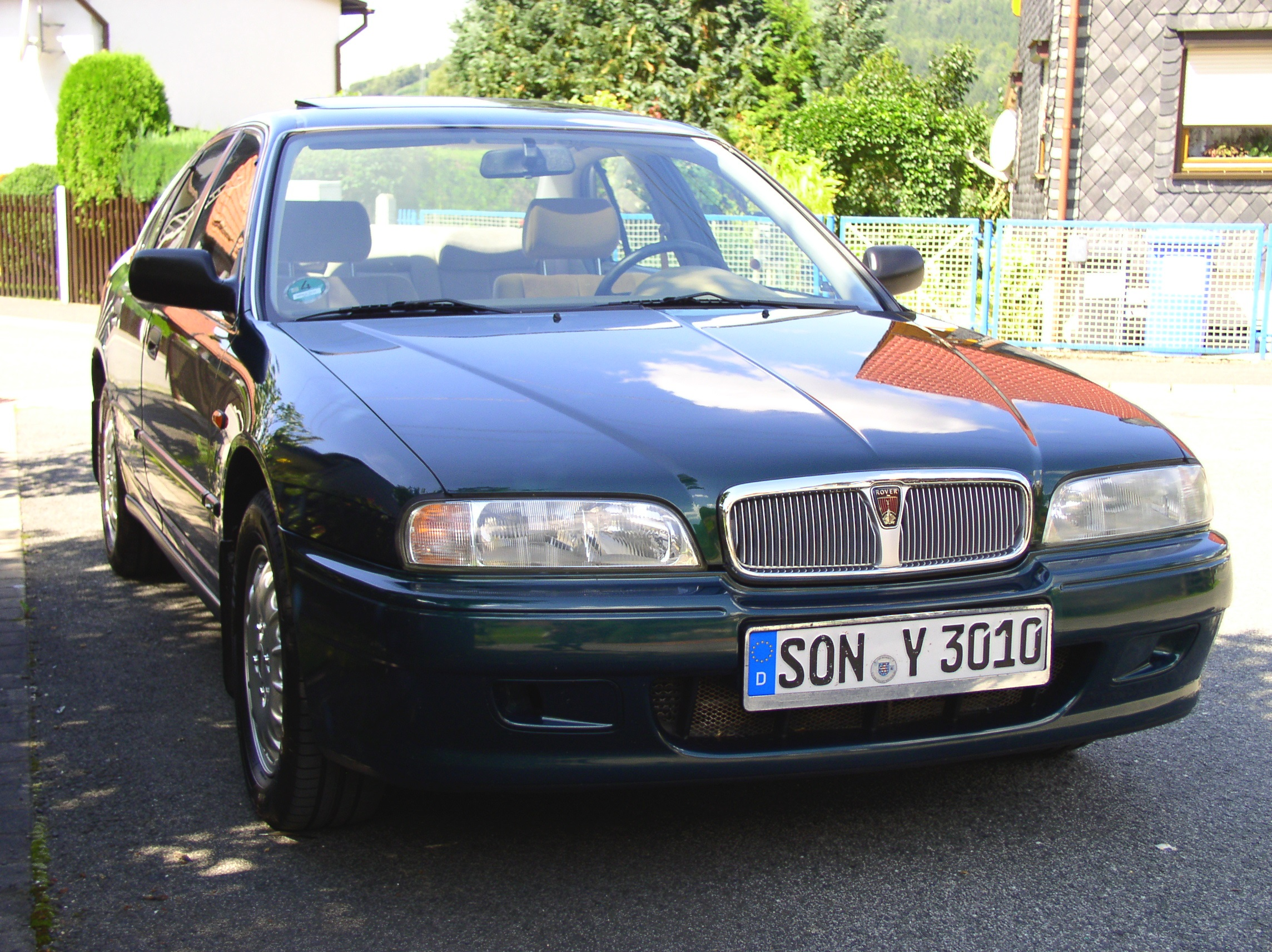
Rover 620i

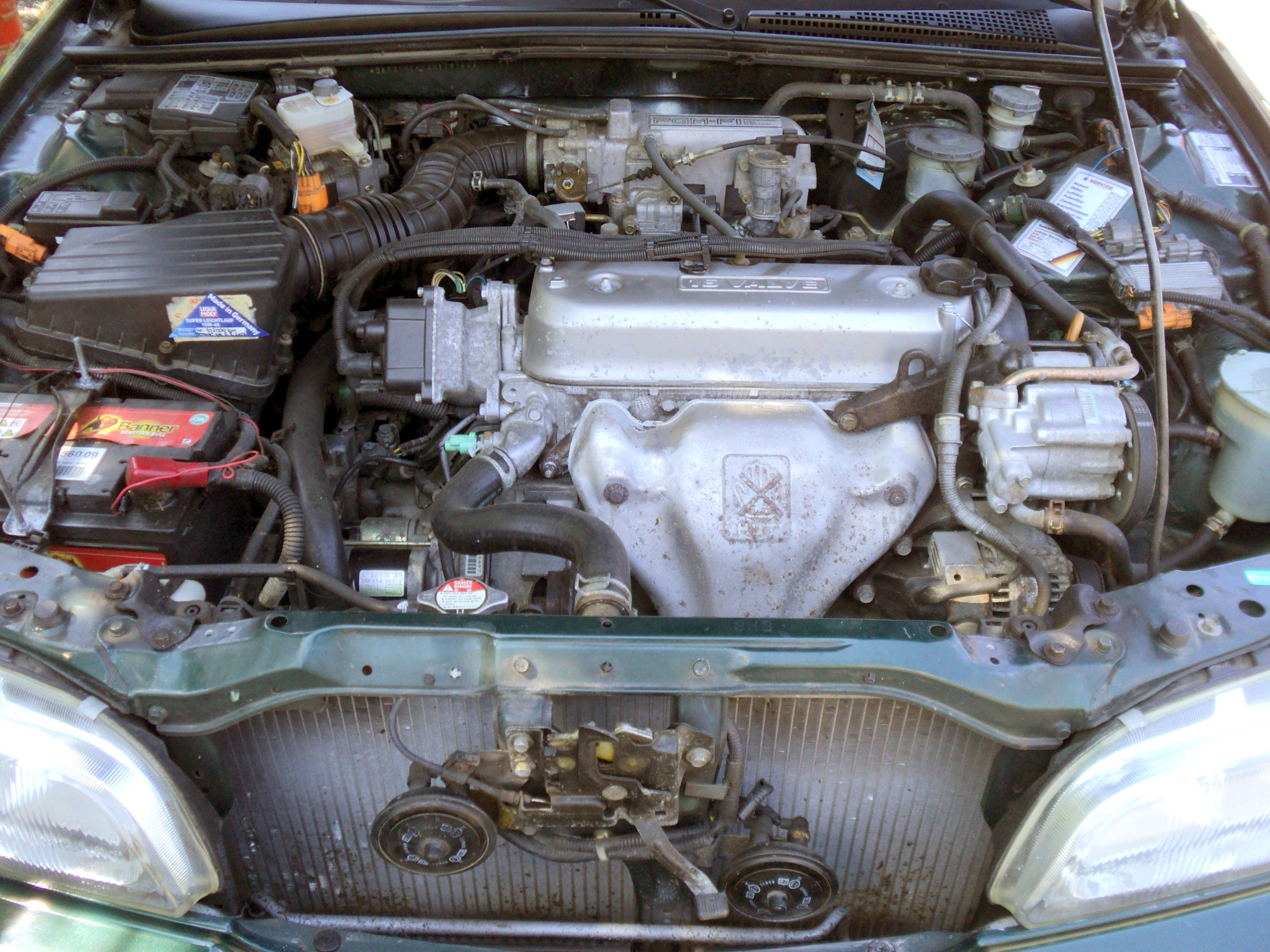
Rover 620i Honda 2.0 (petrol engine)

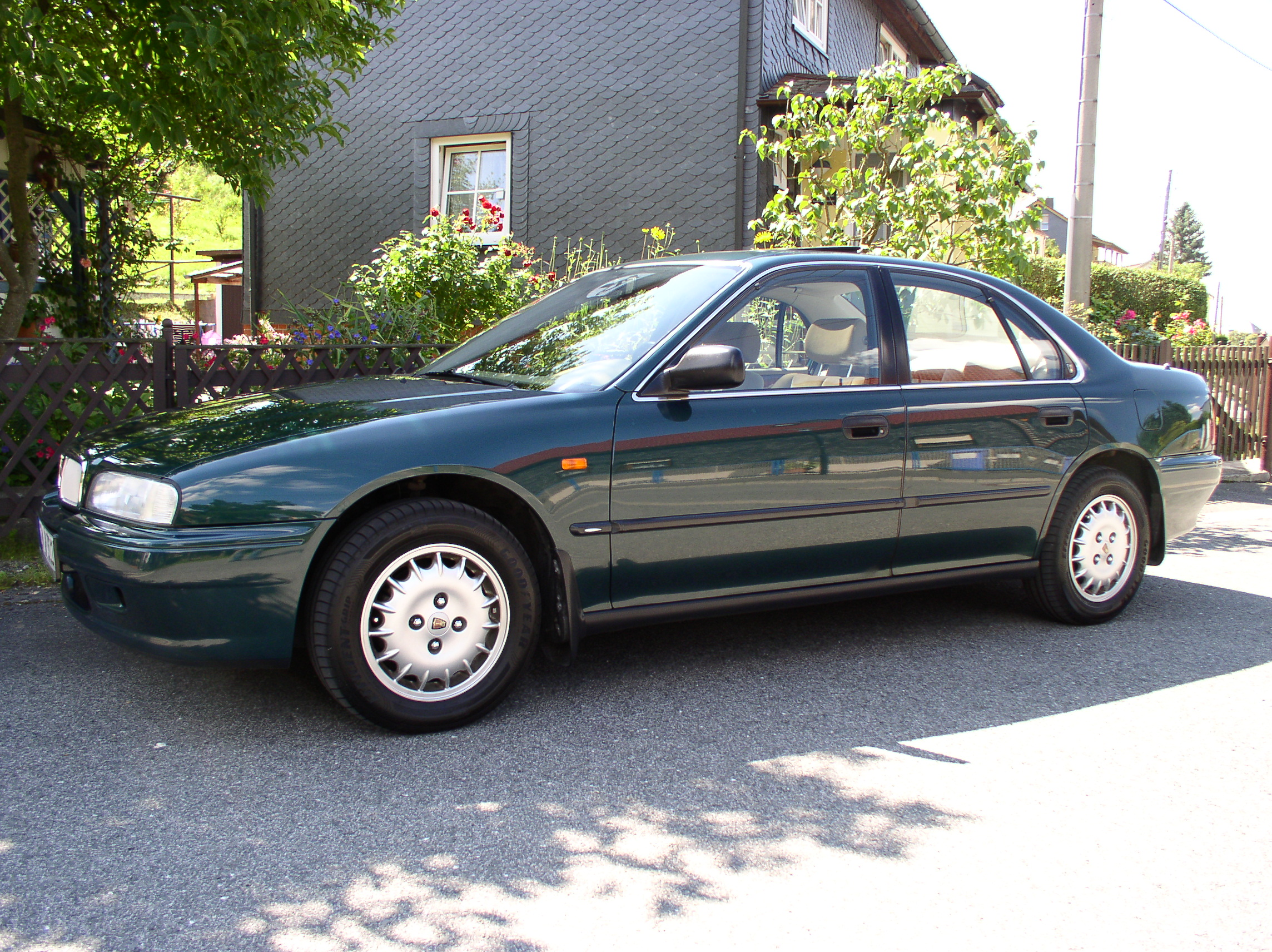
1994 Rover 620i fitted with 15" GSi alloy wheels

- 620 Si
- 620 SLi
- 620 GSi
- 623 SLi
- 623 GSi
- 623 iS
- 620ti
- 620 SDi
- 620 SLDi
- 620 GSDi

Badging indicated engine size: 618 models had 1.8 litre engines, 620 had 2.0 engines, 623 had 2.3 litre engines. With the exception of the T-Series 620ti, all petrol engines were sourced from Honda, and the diesel version used the Rover L-series engine. The Rover K-series engine was not used in the 600.

The 600 was available in a number of different trims. All models had power steering, electric front windows, remote central locking with alarm and immobiliser and tinted windows. The Si had split rear seats, Si Auto and above got a sunroof. SLi trim added electric rear windows and wooden door trim; GSi models received 15" multispoke alloys and full leather trim.

From 1994, all cars had a driver's airbag. The 623iS had half leather trim and a small lip spoiler on its boot. The ti featured a set of 16" six spoke alloys with uprated suspension, 'Torsen' gearbox and a dark half leather interior.

Run out models included:

- 618iL
- 618iS
- 620iSD
- 620iLD

S and SD models had the appearance of the 620ti, with the same six spoke 16" alloy wheels and half leather trim. L and LD models had seven spoke 15" alloy wheels and full leather trim resembling the GSi models.

The range was revised/mildly "facelifted" twice.

The first revisions were in 1996, which included a slightly revised interior, with a padded front arm rest and separate rear head rests, all models, apart from the ti, had 15" wheels, high level brake light, new alarm and immobiliser system (the alarm changed from an infra red to a radio controlled handset and the ignition key became a 'transponder key', without which the immobiliser could not be disarmed), drink holders in the front doors, electric headlight adjuster and all models from Si specification upwards receive air conditioning and 15" alloys.

At this time, the T-series changed ignition system from Distributor to 'wasted spark', pistons, Klinger head gasket, LSD and the steering was changed to Rover's Positive Centre Feel (PCF) system. United Kingdom cars which featured these revisions were all badged as "600" only, in line with most other models in the Rover range which no longer had badging by engine sizes.

The final revisions came in 1997, just over a year later, and all cars got slightly lowered suspension (~10 mm) and body coloured sills, rubbing strips, door handles and door mirror covers.

== 620ti ==
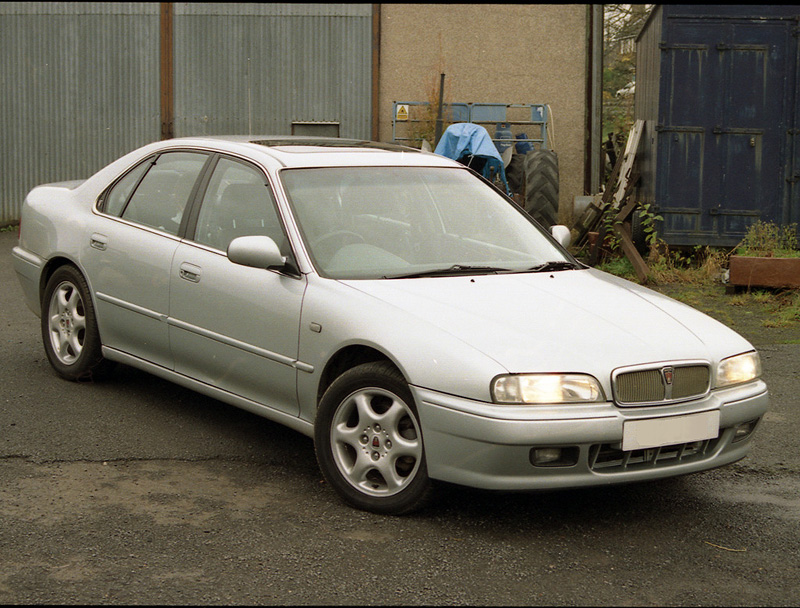
Rover 620ti

In 1994, the 620ti was launched. It had a turbocharged, intercooled, 16-valve, twin cam 2.0-litre T-series engine, a top speed of 143 mph (230 km/h), and a 0–60 mph time of seven seconds, thanks to 197 bhp (147 kW; 200 PS) and 174 lb⋅ft (236 N⋅m) torque. The 620ti also had uprated suspension, dark half leather upholstery, and a set of six-spoke 16-inch alloy wheels.

Autocar magazine (8 February 1995) had an example on a long term test, and found it to be as quick in the mid range as a Ford Sierra Sapphire 2.0i RS Cosworth, following tests at Millbrook Proving Ground.

== Production ==
Year	Production
1993	30,594
1994	54,604
1995	61,533
1996	43,701
1997	40,291
1998	40,815
1999	974
Total	272,512

== Reviews ==
- The AA
  'The Rover 600 ... has the finest power units and sweetest gearchange ... its unique aura and good looks will appeal to those who buy with their hearts not their heads. (But) the 600 costs more to buy and run. It is under equipped and takes up a lot of space outside, without offering any of the benefit ... inside.'
- Honest John
  Positives: Smart looking car, best with 2.3 litre engine, Honda Accord based and the most reliable Rover of its era.
  Negatives: Lacklustre ride and handling, prone to inner rear wings rust, T-Series engines suffer head gasket trouble.
- RAC
  'A sound design that managed to keep the Rover image moving upmarket. If you want British luxury and quality Japanese engineering, the 600 could be just your cup of Earl Grey. Many buyers are now realising what a bargain this combination of cultures represents. Try one and be surprised – it's better than you might think.'
