= Austin Ambassador =

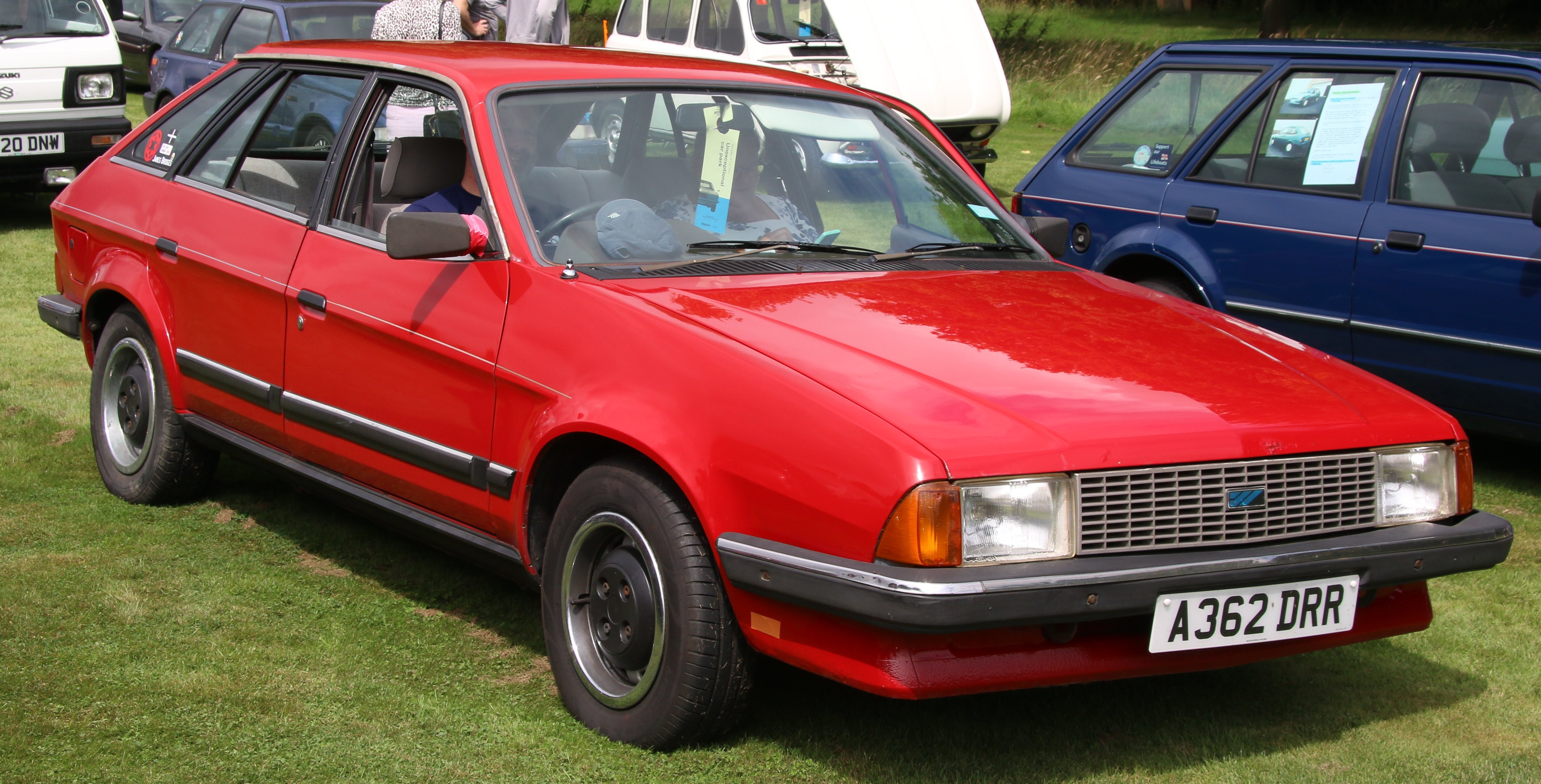

Overview
- Manufacturer: British Leyland
- Production: March 1982 – March 1984
- Assembly: United Kingdom: Cowley, Oxford (Cowley plant)

Body and chassis
- Class: Large family car (D)
- Body style: 5-door hatchback

Powertrain
- Engine: 1.7 L O-series I4; 2.0 L O-series I4
- Transmission: 4-speed manual 3-speed automatic (B-W)

Dimensions
- Wheelbase: 105 inches (2,670 mm)
- Length: 179 inches (4,550 mm)
- Width: 69.5 inches (1,760 mm)
- Height: 55 inches (1,400 mm)
- Kerb weight: 2,784 lb (1,263 kg)

Chronology
- Predecessor: Princess
- Successor: Austin Montego; Rover 800

The Austin Ambassador is a large family car that was introduced by the Austin Rover Group subsidiary of British Leyland in March 1982. The vehicle was a heavily updated version of the Princess, a saloon car that had lacked a hatchback, the car that "the Princess should have been right from the word go" according to one company manager. British Leyland changed the name to underscore the depths of the changes - only the doors and inner structure were carried over, but the wedge-shaped side profile betrayed the car's Princess origins, and buyers did not consider it a truly new model. The Princess had been out of production for four months by the time that the Ambassador went on sale.

To some extent a car that bridged the gap between the smaller Morris Ital and the Rover SD1, sales were low and the model was discontinued in 1984 with 43,427 cars built.

== Design ==
Unlike the Princess, a six-cylinder 2.2-litre version was not available; the Ambassador was offered only as a four-cylinder, initially with either a 1.7-litre or a 2.0-litre variant in "L", "HL", "HLS", and "Vanden Plas" trims. The single carburettor, 1.7-litre engine generates 82 hp (61 kW) at 5200 rpm, while the 2.0-litre engine delivers 92 hp (69 kW) at 4900 rpm. In the HLS and Vanden Plas trims, the Ambassador was equipped with a 2.0-litre engine sporting twin carburettors - this replaced the earlier "six" and allowed a power increase to 100 hp (75 kW) with torque measuring 120 lb⋅ft (163 N⋅m). A benefit of not having to accommodate the taller E6 engine was that the bonnet could be made lower and flatter, although this meant that the wipers were now no longer concealed (unlike those of the Princess). In 1983, the 2.0-litre HL was upgraded to also use the more powerful twin-carburettor engine. A four-speed manual gearbox (and automatic) were the only transmissions offered, with commentators citing the lack of a fifth gear (available in other BL models) for the manual transmission, as one of the car's drawbacks. Despite prototypes being built in left-hand drive, production versions of the Ambassador were only built in right-hand drive form and thus were not exported to continental Europe. Just 14 Ambassadors remain taxed and on the roads in Britain in 2023, out of 43,500 built; compared to around 225,000 for the Princess. As of 2023, 338 Princesses remain in active service in the UK with a MOT. Aside from the Ambassador's connections to the lowly repute of the Princess, commentators point out that its sedate image and driving characteristics (and low performance) also mitigate against its success in a market where performance and taut handling were becoming more important.

Some components, such as the headlights, were shared with the Morris Ital. Other minor components, including much of the interior trim, was also shared with other BL products, such as the Allegro. The redesigned interior was generally not considered an improvement over that of the Princess, feeling cheap and lacking a rev counter – even in the top HLS model. According to British Leyland, only the front door skins were directly shared with the Princess. The rear part of the chassis was modified to accommodate the opening hatch, and there were windows in the C-pillars which did make for an airier cabin.

The Ambassador only served as a stop-gap in the Austin range, being discontinued in March 1984 (after exactly two years in production), with no official replacement. The gap it left in the Austin-Rover range was effectively filled by the slightly smaller Montego, and by lower-specced versions of the new Rover 800 series.

== Sales ==
The Ambassador achieved domestic sales of 43,427 in the two years in which it was available.

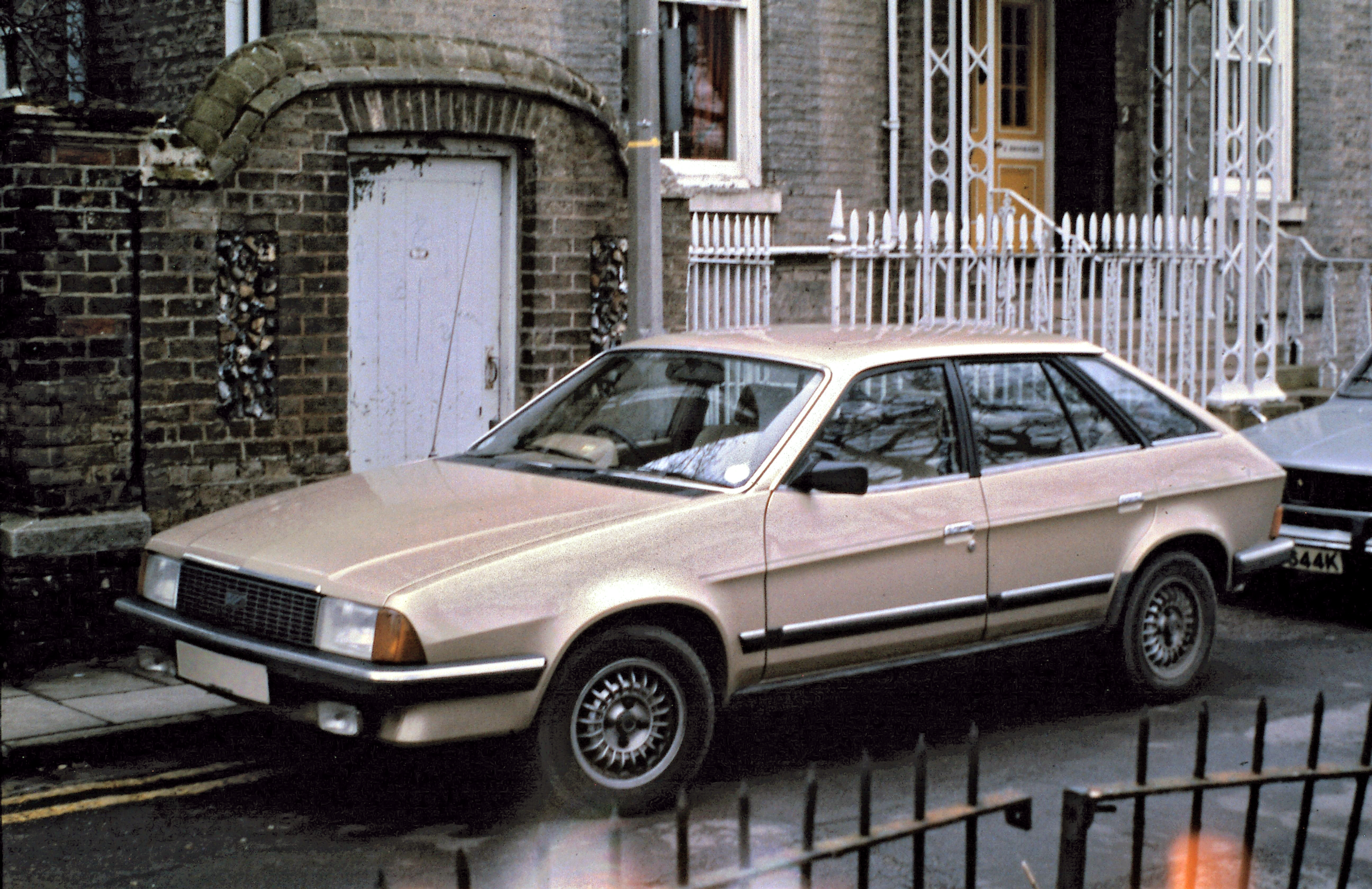
1982–1983 Ambassador

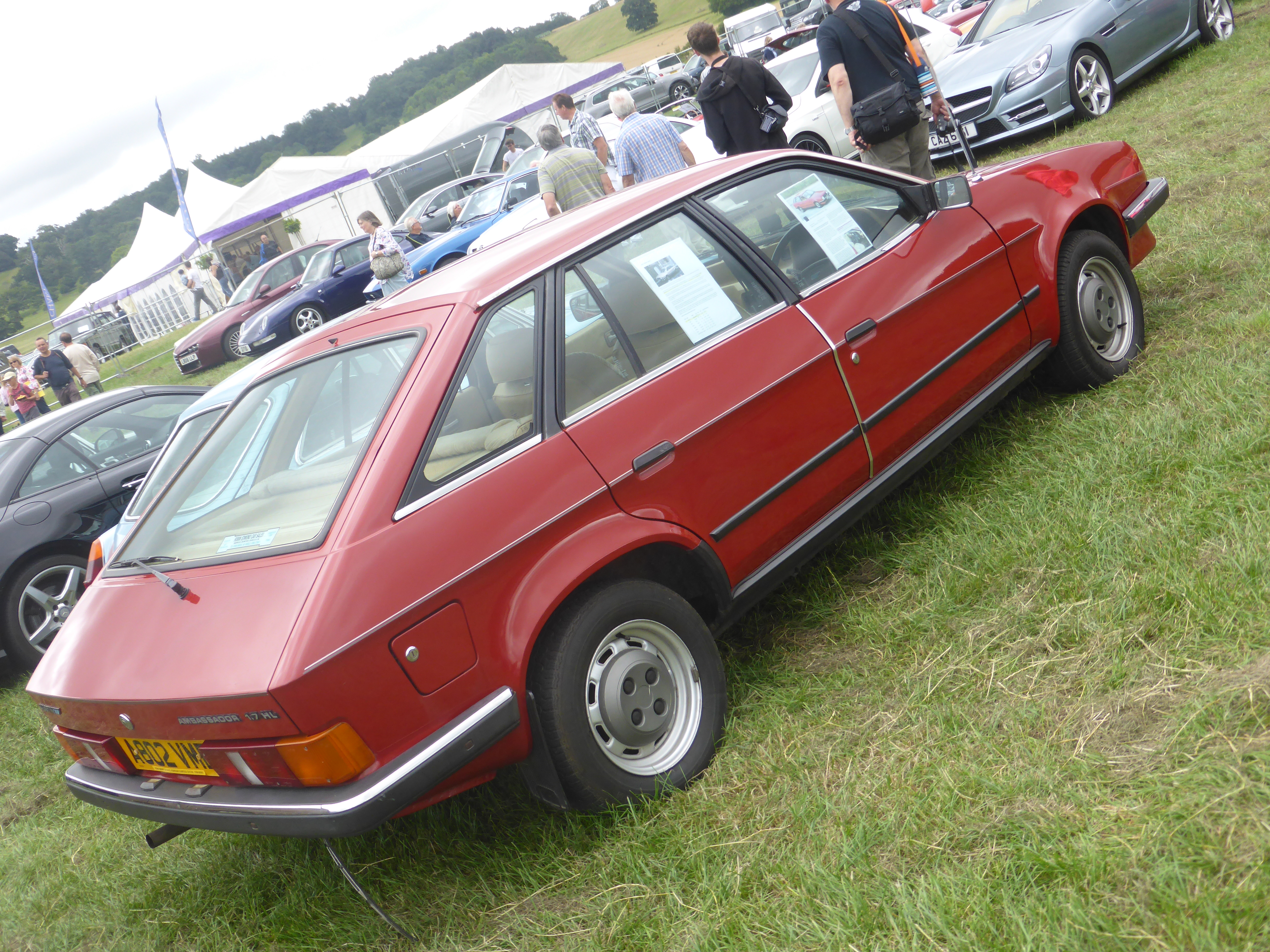
Ambassador hatchback (rear view)

UK engine and trim options	L	HL	HLS	Vanden Plas
1.7	✓	✓		
2.0		✓		
2.0 twin carb		✓	✓	✓

== In popular culture ==
- A fleet of red Austin Ambassadors was shown on a production line in a 1982 Not the Nine O'Clock News skit – all the actor employees on the line were known as Bob. The end of the skit proclaimed "The BL Ambassador – Hand Built by Roberts". This was a parody of the Fiat ad campaign for the Strada, which, owing to its robotised production line, proclaimed it was "hand built by robots".
- The Austin Ambassador was the subject of the song "Y Reg" by comedian Graham Fellows (as his alter-ego John Shuttleworth), in which he sings of his love for the car. The Y registration dates the model to August 1982 to July 1983.
