= 8R =

8R may refer to:

- Sol Líneas Aéreas IATA airlines designator
- Guyana aircraft registration code
- A standard consumer print size for photographs. See Standard photographic print sizes.

== See also ==
- R8 (disambiguation)
