= R08 =

R08 may refer to:

- Rely R08, a midsize pickup truck
- HMS Hardy (R08), a Royal Navy V-class destroyer launched in 1943 and lost in 1944
- HMS Bulwark (R08), a Royal Navy Centaur-class light fleet aircraft carrier launched in 1948 and decommissioned in 1981
- HMS Queen Elizabeth (R08), a Queen Elizabeth-class aircraft carrier launched in 2014

== See also ==
- R8 (disambiguation)
