= BL O-series engine =

BL O-series
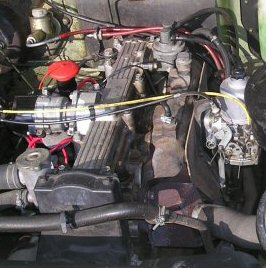

Overview
- Manufacturer: British Leyland Motor Corporation; Austin Rover Group
- Also called: Rover M8
- Production: 1978–1993

Layout
- Configuration: Straight-4
- Cylinder block material: cast iron
- Cylinder head material: aluminium
- Valvetrain: SOHC

Combustion
- Fuel system: Carburettor or Fuel Injection
- Fuel type: petrol
- Cooling system: water-cooled

Chronology
- Predecessor: BMC B-series engine; BMC E-series engine
- Successor: Rover M-series engine; Rover T-series engine; Rover K-series engine; Rover L-series engine (diesel)

The BL O-series engine is an automobile straight-four engine family that was produced by the Austin-Morris division of British Leyland (BL) as a replacement of the BMC B-series engine family. The design and development of the new engine cost £38 million. (See also another B-series successor, the BMC E-series engine.)

Introduced by BL in 1978 in the rear wheel drive Series 3 Morris Marina and the smaller engined versions of the front-wheel-drive Princess, it was intended to replace the 1.8 L B-series unit. The main advance over the B series was that the new unit was of belt driven overhead camshaft configuration, with an aluminium cylinder head.

== Design ==
Offered in the unusual capacity of 1.7 L as well as 2.0 L, it proved to be reliable and was widely used in BL vehicles. These included the rear wheel drive Morris Ital of 1980 (1.7 L or 2.0 L with an automatic gear box), the rear wheel drive Rover SD1 of 1982 (2.0 L only), and 1.7 L and 2.0 L in the front wheel drive Austin Ambassador – in fact the only engine offered in this model. The 2-litre O-series design is 35 lb lighter than the previous B-series, resulting in a total dry wright of 325 lb, together with a noise reduction of 5.5dB at 3,000 rpm. The engines were built at the Cofton Hackett engine plant.

In 1984, it was reworked for installation in high specification 2.0 L versions of the front-wheel drive Austin Maestro and Austin Montego, where it was later optionally available with fuel injection or turbo-charging. This installation of the O-series was adapted for use with the Honda PG-1 end-on manual gearbox, replacing the gearbox-in-sump design traditionally used on British Leyland front-wheel-drive products. The 1.7 L O-series was not used in these vehicles, which featured R- and later S-series 1.6 L units instead. The cylinder blocks of the transmission-in-sump (Princess/Ambassador), rear wheel drive longitudinal (Marina/Ital/Rover SD1), and the transverse, end-on transmission (Maestro/Montego/Rover 800) versions are not interchangeable.

A notable advantage of the 2-litre, petrol O-series engine is that the cylinder head does not require modification to run on unleaded petrol due to having hardened valve seats. Other O-series engines, however, cannot run on unleaded without modification of the cylinder head or use of an additive.

By 1987, British Leyland (now known as the Rover Group) equipped the O-series with a 16-valve cylinder head for the Rover 800. This 2.0 L unit was known as the M series, and was further reworked into the T series in 1992. The 8-valve version of the O-series was also briefly used in budget versions of the Rover 800, although confusingly this was given the "M8" designation in official Rover service publications – implying it was an 8-valve version of the M Series engine, although it was identical to the O series used in the Maestro and Montego.

== 1.7 L petrol engine ==
The 1.7 L displaces 1,698 cc (103.6 cu in). It is an 8-valve SOHC design with an aluminium head and iron block. The engine is a spark-ignition 4-stroke naturally aspirated petrol engine. Fuel system is via carburettor. Power is 58 kW DIN (78 bhp; 79 PS) at 5150 rpm in the Morris Marina, and 62 kW DIN (83 bhp; 84 PS) at 5200 rpm in the Austin Ambassador. Net torque is 131 N⋅m (97 lb⋅ft) at 3500 rpm. When installed in the Sherpa van, it had a lowered compression ratio of 7.8 : 1 and could be run on lower octane, "two-star" petrol. Maximum power for this variant is 45.5 kW DIN (61 bhp; 62 PS) at 4100 rpm, torque is 117 N⋅m (86 lb⋅ft) at 3000 rpm.

Bore x stroke: 84.46 mm × 75.79 mm (3.33 in × 2.98 in)

=== Applications ===
- 1978 - 1980 Morris Marina
- 1980 - 1984 Morris Ital
- 1978 - 1981 Princess 2
- 1982 - 1984 Austin Ambassador
- 1978 - 198x Leyland/Morris/Freight Rover Sherpa (200)
- Naylor/Hutson TF 1700

== 2.0 L petrol engine ==
The 2.0 L displaces 1,994 cc (121.7 cu in). It is an 8-valve SOHC design with an aluminium head and iron block. The engine is a spark-ignition, four-stroke naturally aspirated petrol engine. Fuel system is via carburettor. Power is 74.5 kW DIN (100 bhp; 101 PS) at 5250 rpm in the Austin Ambassador. Net torque is 163 N⋅m (120 lb⋅ft) at 3250 rpm. Maximum power for the lower compression variant installed in the Freight Rover (later Leyland DAF 200/400) is 63 kW DIN (84 bhp; 86 PS) at 4250 rpm, torque is 155 N⋅m (114 lb⋅ft) at 3500 rpm.

Bore x stroke: 84.46 mm × 88.9 mm (3.33 in × 3.50 in)

=== Applications ===
- 1980–1984 Morris Ital
- 1982 Rover SD1
- 1978 - 1981 Princess 2
- 1982–1984 Austin Ambassador
- 1985-1992 MG Maestro
- 1984–1993 Austin/MG Montego
- 1978 - 198x Leyland/Morris/Freight Rover Sherpa (200)
- 1983 - 1989 Freight Rover Sherpa 300 series
- 1989 - 1991 Leyland DAF 400
- 1988 - 1991 Rover 820

== Diesel versions ==
In 1986, BL collaborated with Perkins to convert the O-series to run on diesel. The oil-burning versions, known as the Rover MDi or Perkins Prima, proved to be highly successful in the Maestro and Montego, and helped sustain the ailing mid-sized models into the 1990s. Perkins successfully marketed the engine under its own brand in the industrial and marine sectors. It was further developed by MG Rover to form their Rover L-series engine, which was manufactured until 2005.

Examples of vehicles using the diesel version of the O-series engine:

- Austin Maestro
- Austin Montego
- 1987 - 1993 Freight Rover Sherpa 200/Leyland DAF 200/LDV 200
