= List of Audi R8 automobiles =

Audi R8 is a name introduced in 1999 by Audi for Le Mans 24 Hours race cars, and later used for a street-legal car and related concept cars.

In chronological order, they are:

- 1999 Audi R8R, an open top Le Mans Prototype race car made for the 1999 24 Hours of Le Mans
- 1999 Audi R8C, a closed top LM GT Prototype race car made for the 1999 24 Hours of Le Mans
- 2000 Audi R8 (LMP), five-time Le Mans-winning successor to the R8R, competing until 2006
- 2003 Audi Le Mans quattro (also called the Audi R8 Concept), a concept car for the future R8
- 2007 Audi R8 (Type 42), mid-engined, two-seater production sports car
- 2008 Audi R8 Le Mans Concept, with a 12-cylinder TDI diesel engine
- 2015 Audi R8 (Type 4S), the second generation of the production sports car
