= Rover M-series engine =

The Rover M series (or M16) is a line of 4-cylinder, DOHC internal-combustion engine introduced by the Austin Rover Group in 1986 for the then-new Rover 800 series.

The M series was produced only in one cubic capacity – 1994 cc (2.0 L), and was a 16 valve development of the older British Leyland O-series unit first seen in 1978. For the Rover 800, there were two different versions, with single point fuel injection (for the Rover 820e) or multi-point injection (for the 820i). The M series uses the same cylinder block as the O-series unit as found in the Maestro and Montego, which mates with the Powertrain Ltd PG-1 manual gearbox. These were also used in the Morgan Plus Four, the only rear wheel drive application this engine was used in, meaning these can be put in rear wheel drive layouts using the Rover LT77 transmission

In 1990, the M series was also installed in the Rover 200 series, before being superseded in 1992 by the similar T series which was a development of the same design.

== Turbocharged version ==
Tickford also tuned the M-series engine which was installed in 536 models of the Rover 820 in 1991. This was nicknamed the Tickford Turbo. It needed to have its power capped: it is believed that Rover's marketing department had a say in the final power output of the M16 Turbo:

The request from marketing was to not hinder V6 sales therefore the performance should not exceed that of the 2.7-litre Honda V6 (177PS), hence the performance was limited to 180 PS deliberately.

In the end, 563 examples were built, of which, many ended up in the hands of BAe executives (BAe/Rover company cars being the biggest source of UK Rover 800 registrations at the time). Only a handful survive today.
