= Rover T-series engine =

Rover T series
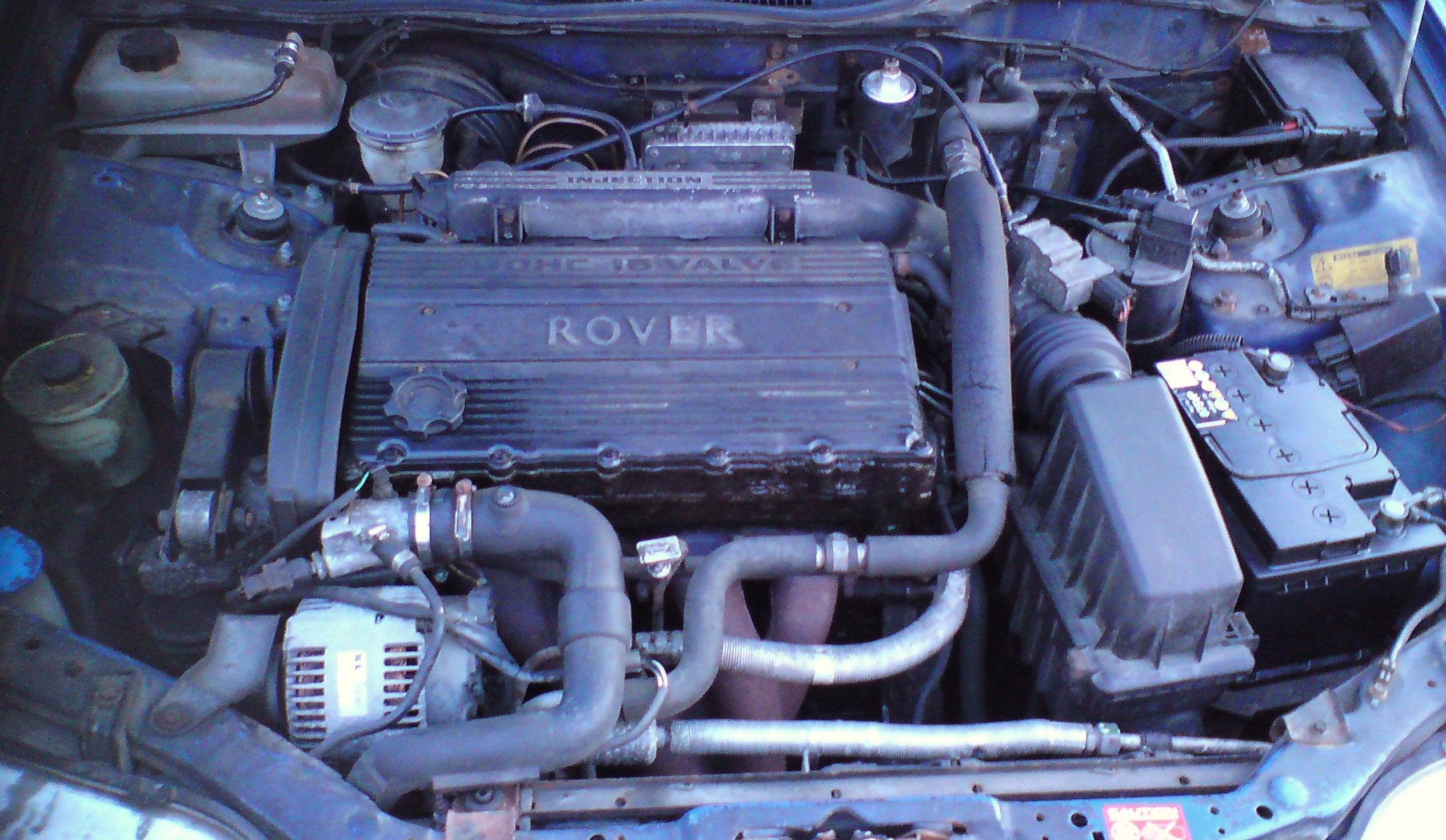

Overview
- Manufacturer: Rover Group
- Production: 1992–1999

Layout
- Configuration: Straight-4
- Displacement: 2.0 L; 121.7 cu in (1,994 cc)
- Cylinder bore: 84.45 mm (3.325 in)
- Piston stroke: 89 mm (3.5 in)
- Cylinder block material: Cast iron
- Cylinder head material: Cast aluminium
- Valvetrain: DOHC 4 valves x cyl.

Combustion
- Turbocharger: In some versions
- Fuel system: Fuel injection
- Management: Rover MEMS
- Fuel type: Petrol
- Cooling system: Water-cooled

Output
- Power output: 136–197 bhp (101–147 kW; 138–200 PS)

Chronology
- Predecessor: BL O-series engine
- Successor: Rover K-series engine

The Rover T16 engine was a 2.0 L; 121.7 cu in (1,994 cc) fuel injected DOHC inline-four petrol engine produced by Rover from 1992 to 1999. It has a bore and a stroke of 84.45 mm × 89 mm (3.325 in × 3.504 in). It is a development of the M series (M16), which was in turn a development of the O series, which dated back to the BMC B-series engine as found in the MG B and many others. Several variants were produced for various models, but all had the same displacement. The naturally aspirated type produced 136 bhp (101 kW; 138 PS), and turbocharged types were available with 180 and 197 bhp (134 and 147 kW; 182 and 200 PS).

== Applications ==
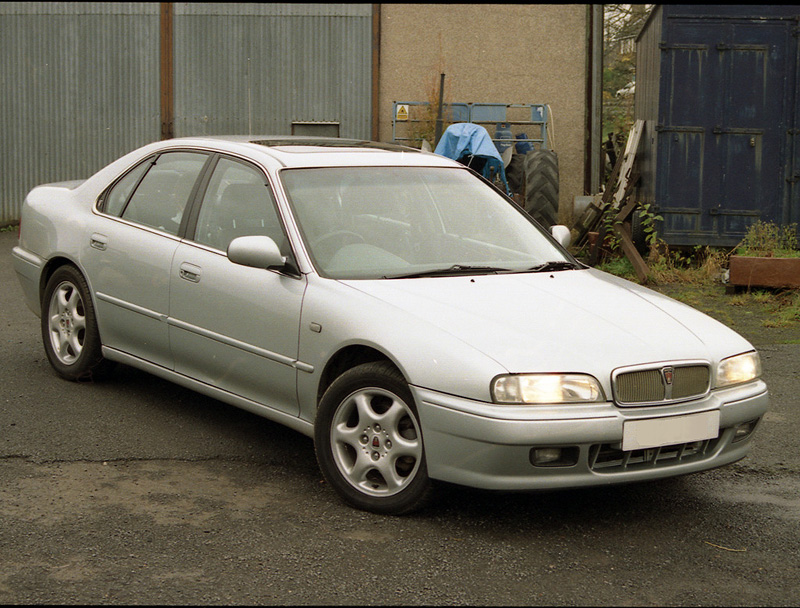
Rover 620ti

The Rover 620ti Turbo, 220 turbo coupé and 820 Vitesse all utilised the engine. The T-series engine also found its way into limited-run Rover 220 3-door hatchbacks in GTi and later GSi trims and the 420 GSI turbo and GSI Sport turbo. The T-series engine is a popular engine for engine conversions in to other Rover-MG vehicles i.e. MG ZR, MG ZS etc. It can also be adapted to a rear-wheel drive layout using a Rover LT77 or R380 transmission.

=== Naturally aspirated (NASP) ===
The non-turbo engine also found its way into the short-lived and generally underpowered Land Rover Discovery 2.0i. Land Rover also fitted the same engine to a special batch of Defenders built for the Italian Carabinieri, which operated an exclusively petrol-powered vehicle fleet. A development vehicle was also built using a turbocharged version of the engine which far out performed the V8 production cars, but no room could be found for it in Land Rover's vehicle strategy.

The engine produces 136 bhp (101 kW; 138 PS) at 6,000 rpm and 136 lb⋅ft (184 N⋅m) of torque at 2,500 rpm.

Application:
1989–1998 Land Rover Discovery MPi
1989–1998 Land Rover Defender MPi (Italian Carabinieri)
1989–1995 Rover 220
1989–1995 Rover 420
1991–1999 Rover 820
1993–2000 Morgan +4 (introduced November 1992)

=== Turbocharged ===
Rover introduced the turbocharged engine in 1992 with the Rover 220 Turbo Coupe, making it the fastest Rover in production, the engine made 197 bhp (147 kW; 200 PS) at 6,100 rpm, although the torque was electronically limited to 171 lb⋅ft (232 N⋅m) at 2,100 rpm due to Rover's own PG1 gearbox not being able to cope with the amount of torque that the engine could produce. The limited torque gives the engine a very flat overall torque curve.

Application:
1989–1995 Rover 220 Turbo
1989–1995 Rover 420
1994–1999 Rover 620Ti
1991–1999 Rover 820 Vitesse
