= Rover 800 series =

Rover 800 Series
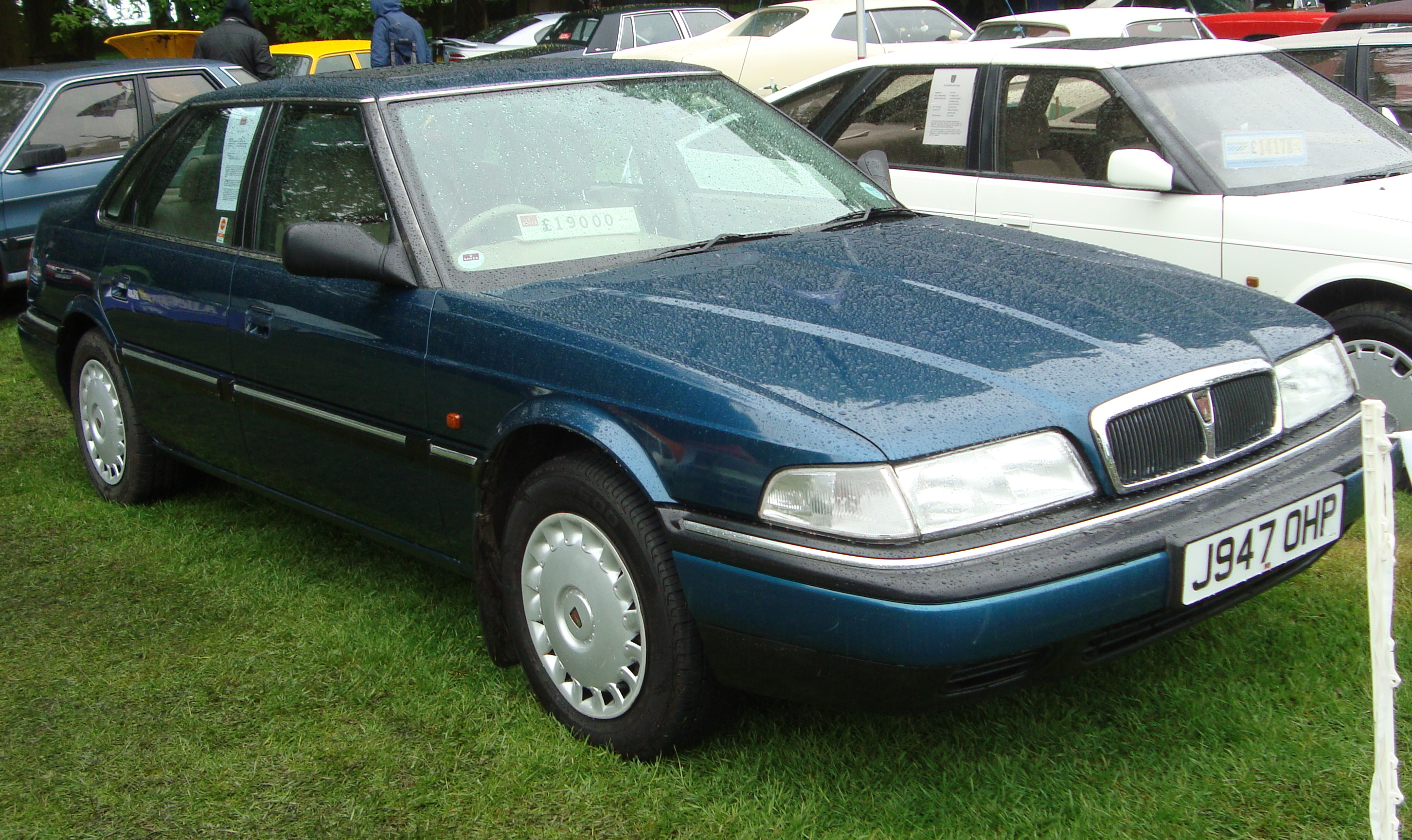
- 1991 Mk2 Rover 820i Saloon

Overview
- Manufacturer: Austin Rover Group (1986–1988); Rover Group (1988–1999)
- Also called: Rover 820; Rover 825; Rover 827; Rover Sterling; Rover Vitesse; Sterling 825
- Production: 1986–1999
- Assembly: United Kingdom: Cowley, Oxford
- Designer: Gordon Sked (1983)

Body and chassis
- Class: Executive car (E)
- Layout: Transverse FF layout
- Related: Honda Legend (1st gen.); Acura Legend (1st gen.)

Chronology
- Predecessor: Rover SD1
- Successor: Rover 75

The Rover 800 series is an executive car (E-segment in Europe) range manufactured by the Austin Rover Group subsidiary of British Leyland, and its successor the Rover Group from 1986 to 1999. It was also marketed as the Sterling in the United States. Co-developed with Honda, the 800 was a close relative to the Honda/Acura Legend and the successor to the decade-old Rover SD1.

== Development ==
=== Partnership with Honda ===
The first product of the BL-Honda alliance was the Triumph Acclaim – and shortly after its launch the two companies mapped out an advisable strategy for future collaborative projects. Plans for a midsize car were investigated, but were dropped because BL already had the Austin Maestro and Austin Montego in the final stages of development. However both BL and Honda had a pressing need for a full-size executive car in their lineups. BL had to start planning for a successor to the Rover SD1, whilst Honda was keen to expand its presence in the lucrative North American market – something which it couldn't fully do unless it had a full-size luxury saloon (at that time the Honda Accord was its biggest model) which would compete with similar large Japanese imports from Toyota and Datsun. Joint development of the car began in 1981 under the "XX" codename; the corresponding Honda version was known as the Honda Legend, and was codenamed as "HX". The development work was carried out at Rover's Cowley plant and Honda's Tochigi development centre. Both cars shared the same core structure and floorpan, but they each had their own unique exterior bodywork and interior. Under the agreement, Honda would supply the V6 petrol engine, both automatic and manual transmissions and the chassis design, whilst BL would provide the 4-cylinder petrol engine and much of the electrical systems.

Honda and Austin Rover agreed that Legends would also be built in the Cowley plant for the British market. The US-market (Acura) Legends were built in Japan. Early Japanese models were built at the Honda Sayama Factory.

It was finally launched on 10 July 1986, taking the place of the decade-old Rover SD1.

== Mark I (1986–1991) ==
Mark I
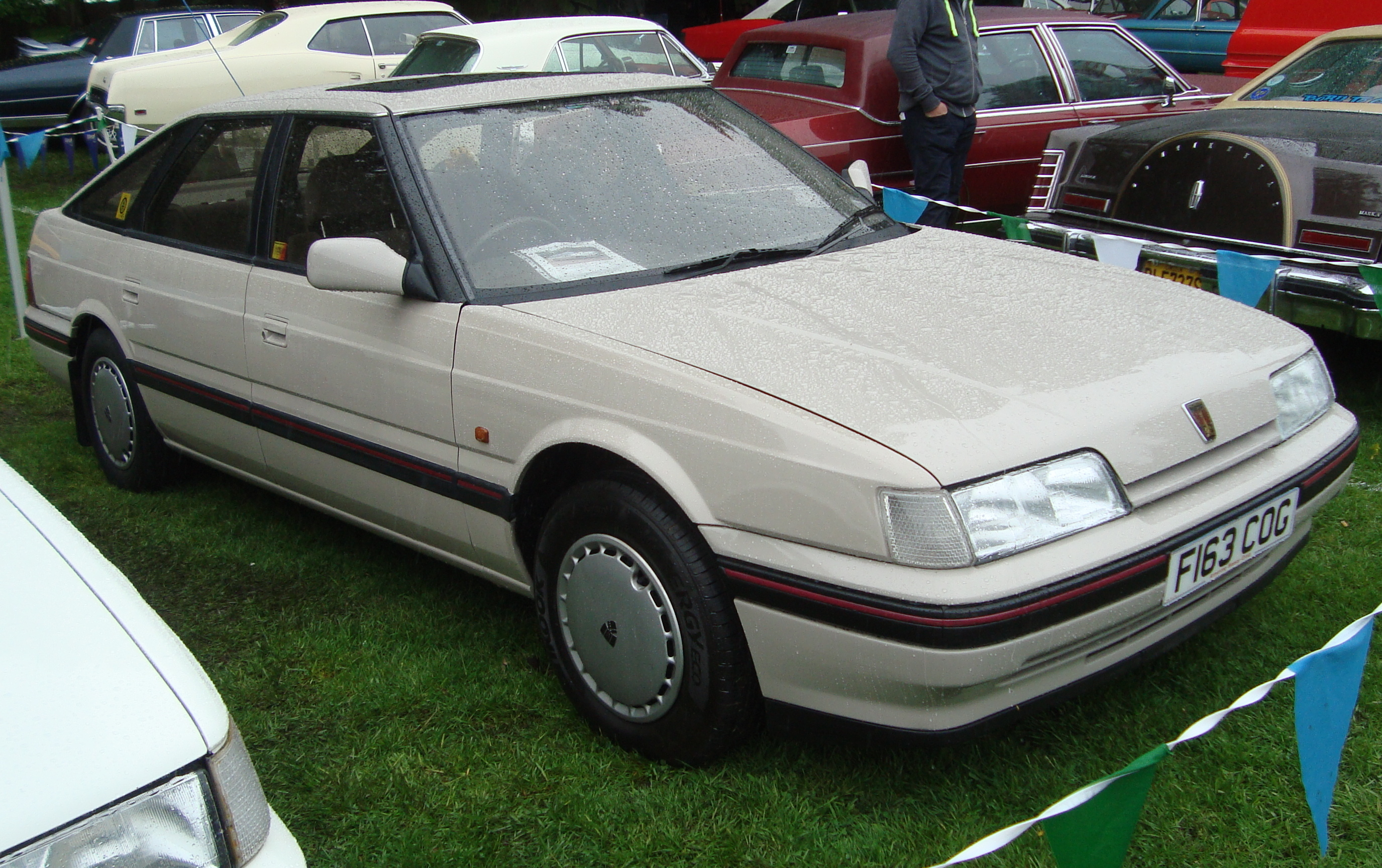
- 1989 Rover 820 E hatchback

Overview
- Manufacturer: Austin Rover Group (1986–1988); Rover Group (1988–1991)
- Production: 1986–1991

Body and chassis
- Body style: 4-door saloon 5-door fastback/hatchback

Powertrain
- Engine: petrol: 2.0 L O-series 8V I4; 2.0 L M-series 16V I4; 2.0 L T-series turbo 16V I4; 2.5 L Honda C25A 24V V6; 2.7 L Honda C27A 24V V6
- Transmission: 5-speed manual 4-speed automatic

Dimensions
- Wheelbase: 2,760 mm (108.7 in)
- Length: 4,694 mm (184.8 in)
- Width: 1,946 mm (76.6 in)
- Height: 1,398 mm (55.0 in)

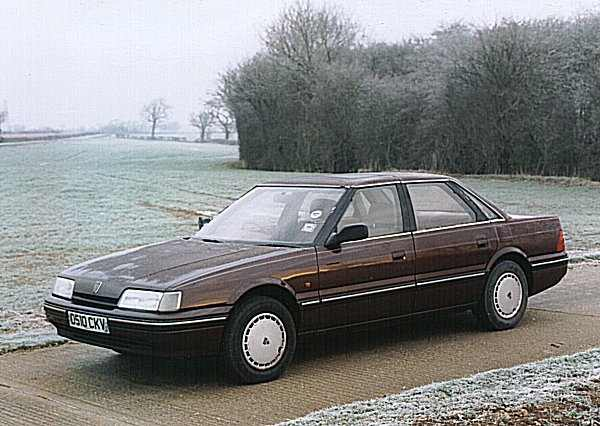
1986 Rover 820Si saloon (pre-R17 facelift)

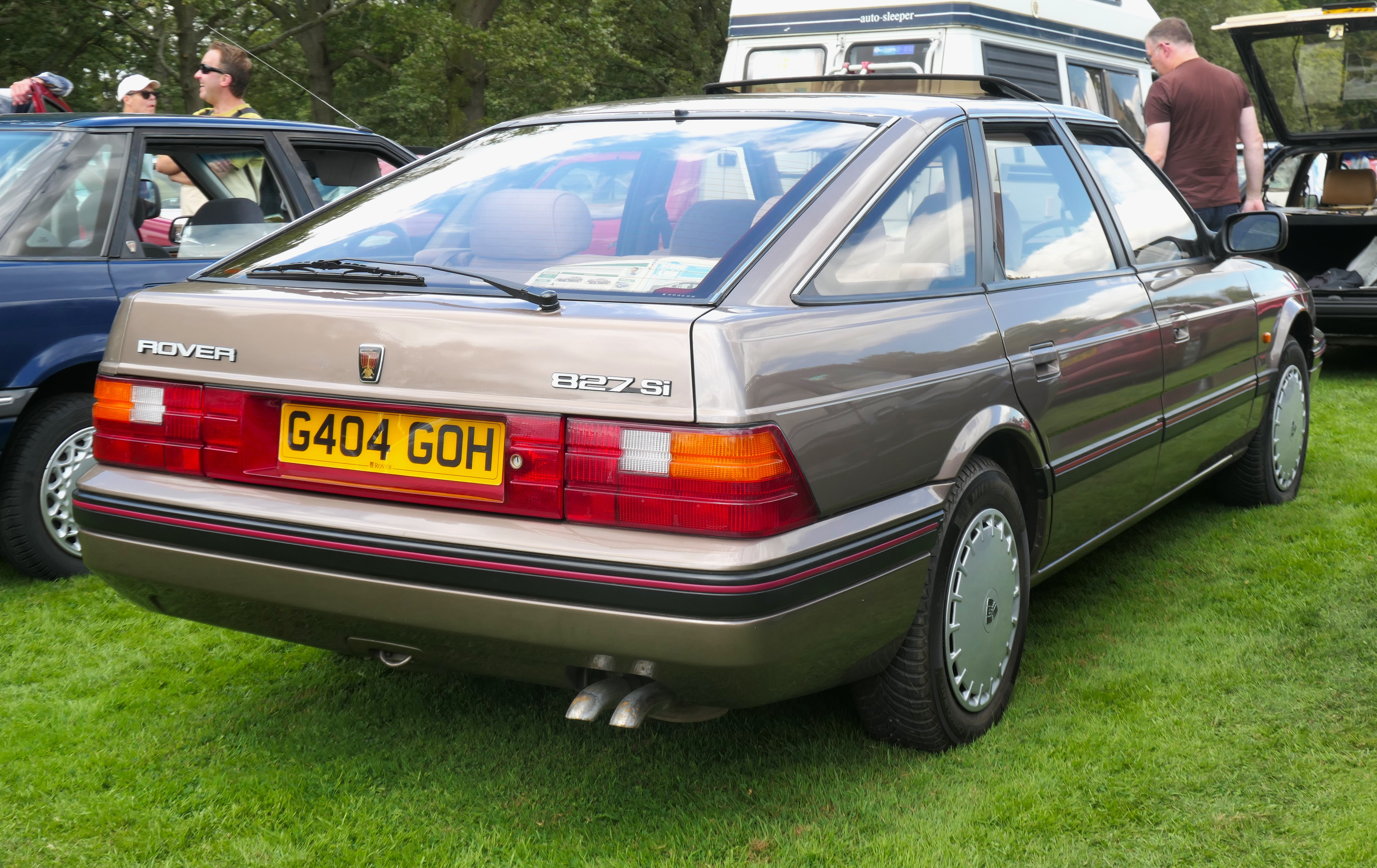
1989 Rover 827Si hatchback (pre-R17 facelift)

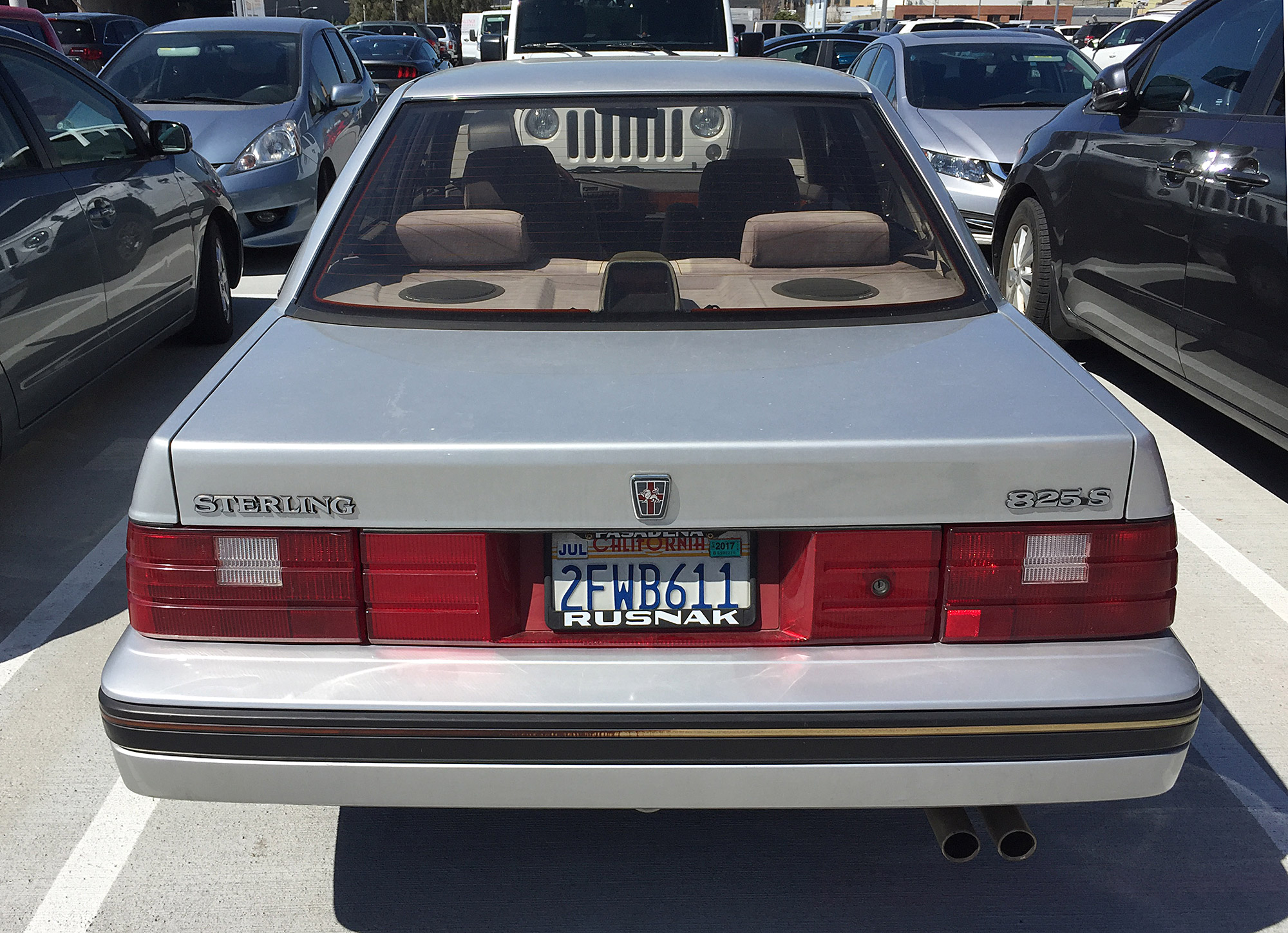
American spec Rover 800s were branded 'Sterling'

At launch, the 2 litre versions of the 800 used two naturally aspirated 2.0 L 16-valve developments of British Leyland's stalwart O-series engine, dubbed the M series. However, in 1988 an 820 Fastback (no letter after the 820 badge), with a single carburettor version of the O series was launched for the fleet market. The M series was divided into two versions; the M16e fitted to the 820e/se, with single point injection, and the M16i which was fitted to the 820i/si with multi-point injection, i.e. 4 injectors – the engine management system derived from that used in the MG Maestro and MG Montego models. The top 2.5 litre versions (825i & Sterling) used a Honda designed V6 unit in 2.5 L capacity. Initially, only a four-door saloon body was offered; a five-door liftback/hatchback version – referred to as a fastback – became available in 1988.

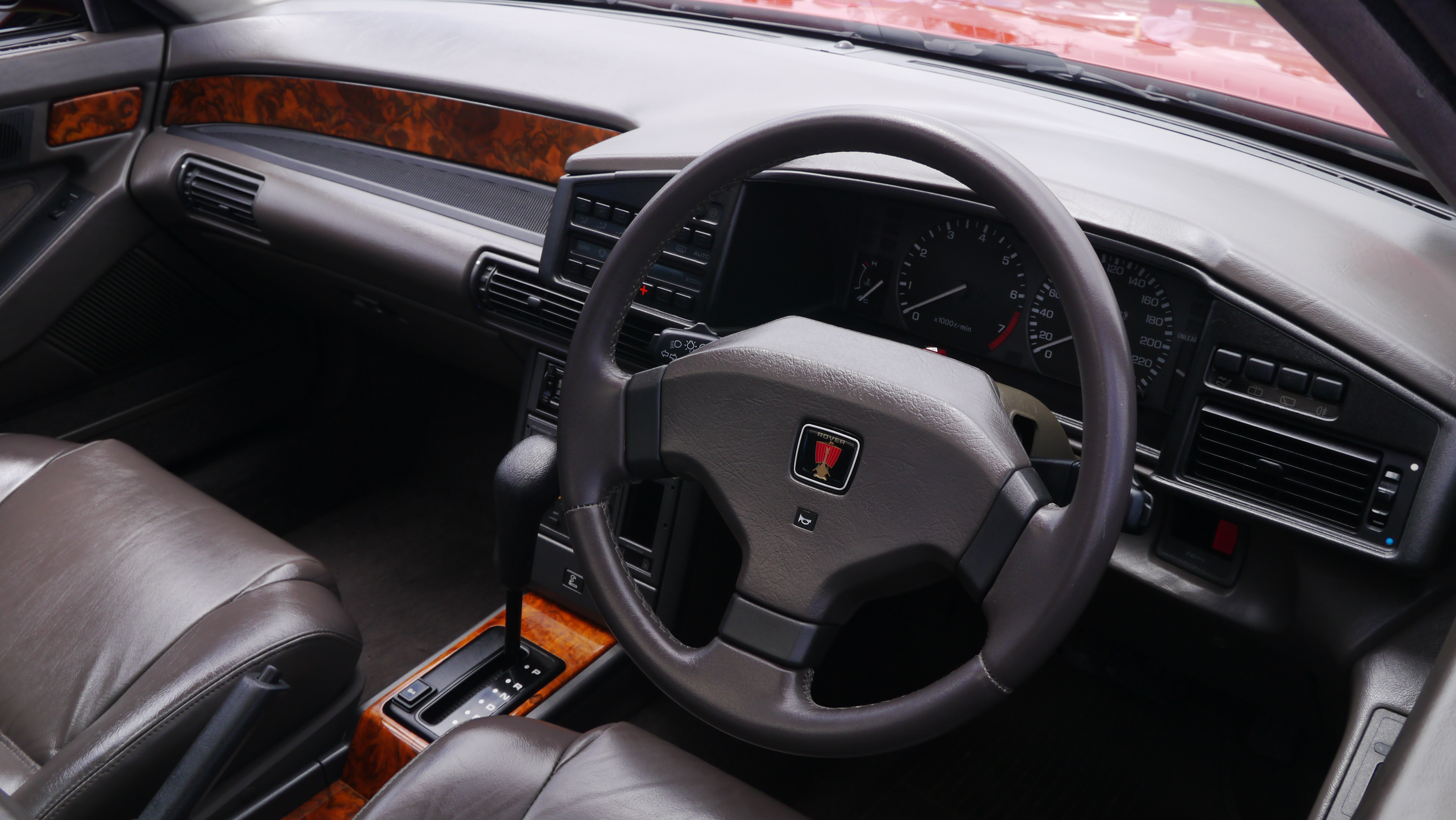
Rover 827 Vitesse hatchback interior

There were no V8 versions of the Rover 800 series, in contrast to earlier Rover saloons of this size including its immediate predecessor, the SD1. Unlike its rear-wheel drive predecessor, it had front-wheel drive. Later, a diesel version of the car was launched in 1990 using a 2498 cc engine from Italian company VM Motori, which was related to the slightly smaller engine used in the 2400 SD Turbo model of the Rover SD1, and Range Rover Turbo D.

The Sterling badge was used in Europe and most global markets to denote the top saloon luxury version and the Vitesse badge used to denote the top fastback sporting version. The Vitesse became available at the same time as the 2675 cc Honda V6. Both of these top of the range models were initially only available in the UK with the V6. In some European markets, in particular Italy, the 2.0-litre petrol was badged as Sterling and later available (in turbo form) as Vitesse to avoid punitive duties that made engines over 2.0 litres non-viable for volume sales. At the time of the launch, the Sterling provoked controversy as it overlapped in price with the entry level versions of the Jaguar XJ40 which was launched at the same time, and had been developed largely when Jaguar was still part of British Leyland.

Towards the end of Mark 1 production the Vitesse had nearly as many "luxury" features as the Sterling (for example, electric front seats). There was also a brief run of just over 500 820 Turbo 16v cars using a turbocharged version of the M series developed with help from Tickford, leading to this model often being referred to as the "Tickford Turbo". Utilising such enhancements as sodium-filled exhaust valves and Mahle forged pistons the car produced 180 bhp (134 kW), although there is much speculation about this figure being severely held back by the electronics as not to step on the toes of the 177 bhp (132 kW) V6-engined models as well as to preserve the reliability of the gearbox.

In the USA, the car was branded as the Sterling, not a Rover and was only available with the Honda V6 petrol engines. Initial sales in America were strong, and the design was well received. However, early vehicles were soon found to have build quality and reliability problems. Sales fell in the US as the reputation of the model deteriorated, with J.D. Power surveys and journalists noting problems with the trim, electrics, paintwork and excessive corrosion. This was especially damaging as at the same time, the same core vehicle, the Acura Legend was doing well in America. Many mechanical parts for the Sterling 825/827 are still readily available as it was similar to the Acura Legend in these areas, save for braking systems. However, electrical, body, and interior parts are quite difficult to locate in the US now. Despite the problems in America, it was the best selling executive car in the UK for 8 years.

In February 1988, the 2.5 L engine was enlarged to 2.7 L, the Maestro-derived instrumentation had been changed to gauges sourced from a different component-builder (losing the oil pressure gauge and voltmeter in the process) and build quality had vastly improved. A short-lived base model of the 800, using an eight-valve (as opposed to the usual 16-valve) version of the O-series engine was introduced. This was called M8, it differed from the O-series engine as the water pump was driven by the timing belt.

The original version of the Rover 800 was one of the most popular cars in Britain's full-sized executive car market, which at this stage was effectively split into two strong sectors – mainstream brands such as Ford and Vauxhall, and prestige brands such as BMW and Audi. It directly competed with the likes of the Ford Granada/Scorpio and Vauxhall Carlton.

== Mark II (R17 major facelift; 1991–1999) ==
Mark II
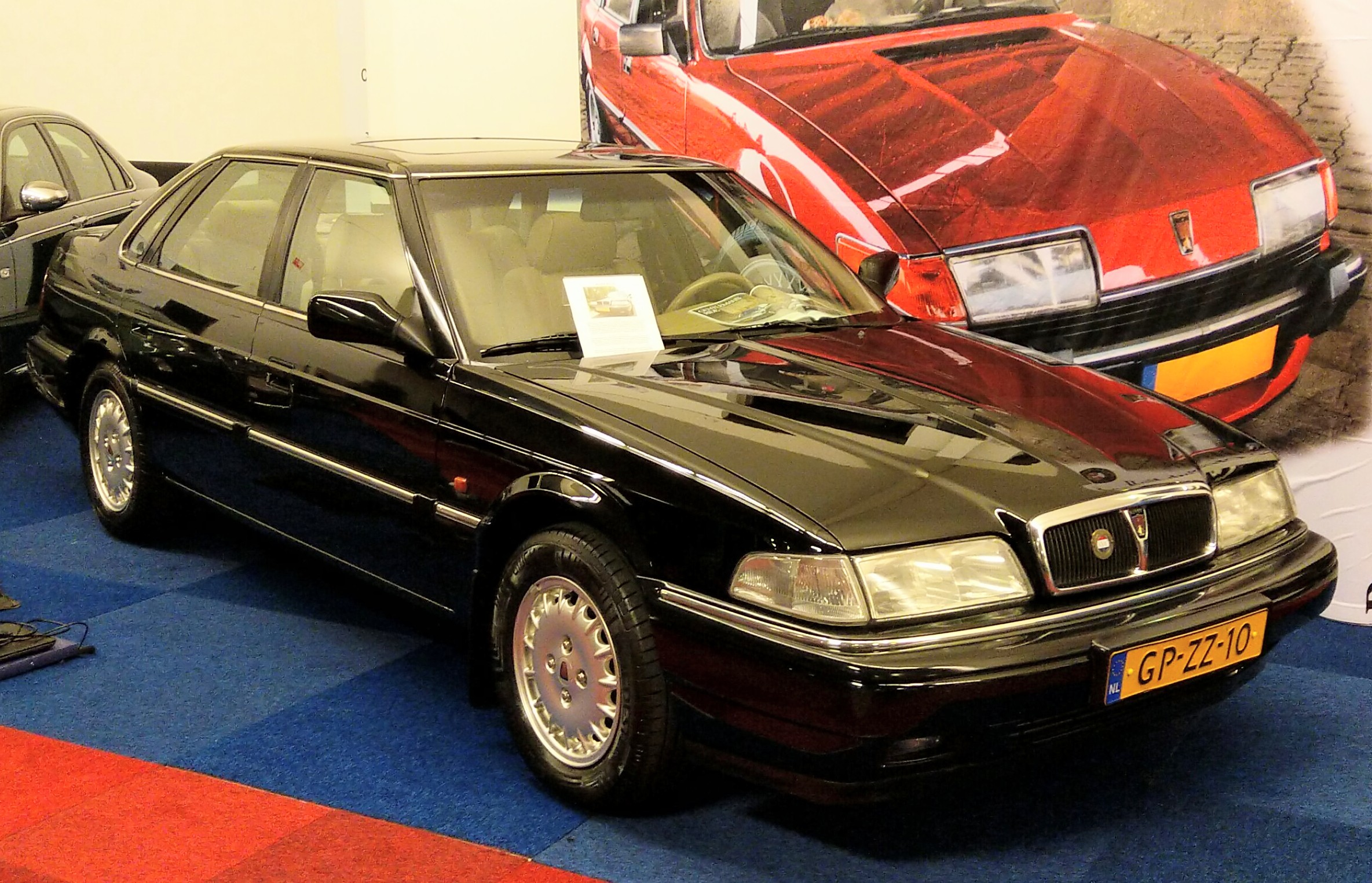
- Rover 800 Saloon (post-R17 facelift)

Overview
- Manufacturer: Rover Group
- Production: 1991–1999

Body and chassis
- Body style: 4-door saloon 5-door liftback 2-door coupé

Powertrain
- Engine: petrol: 2.0 L T-series 16V I4; 2.0 L T-series turbo 16V I4; 2.5 L KV6 24V V6; 2.7 L Honda C27A 24V V6; diesel: 2.5 L VM 425 OHV turbo 8V I4
- Transmission: 5-speed manual 4-speed automatic

Dimensions
- Wheelbase: 2,760 mm (108.7 in)
- Length: 4,882 mm (192.2 in)
- Width: 1,965 mm (77.4 in) (Saloon & Fastback); 1,900 mm (74.8 in) (Coupé)
- Height: 1,363 mm (53.7 in) (Saloon & Fastback); 1,400 mm (55.1 in) (Coupé)

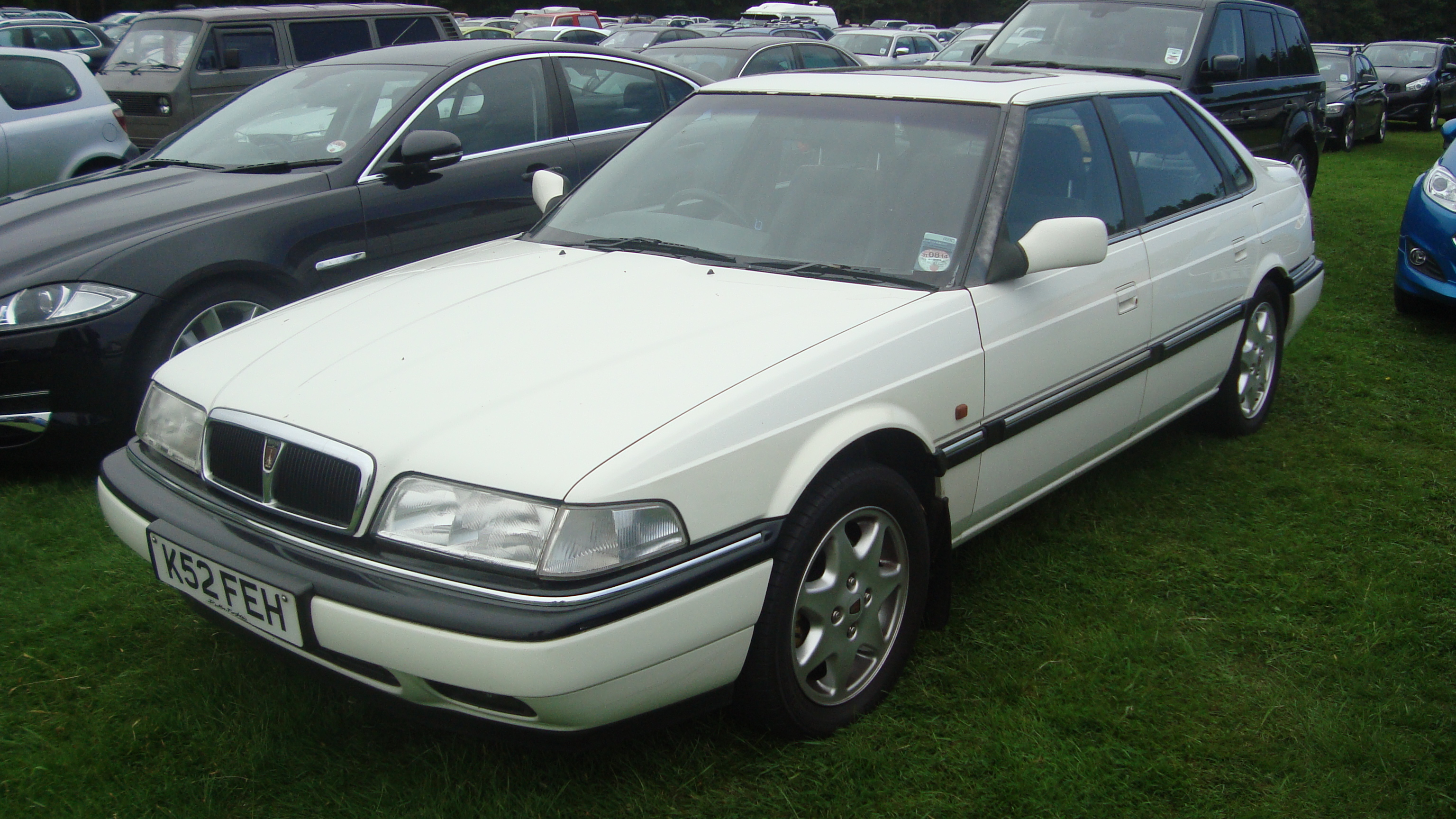
1993 Rover 825SD saloon (post-R17 facelift, but a year before minor changes including smoked rear lights)

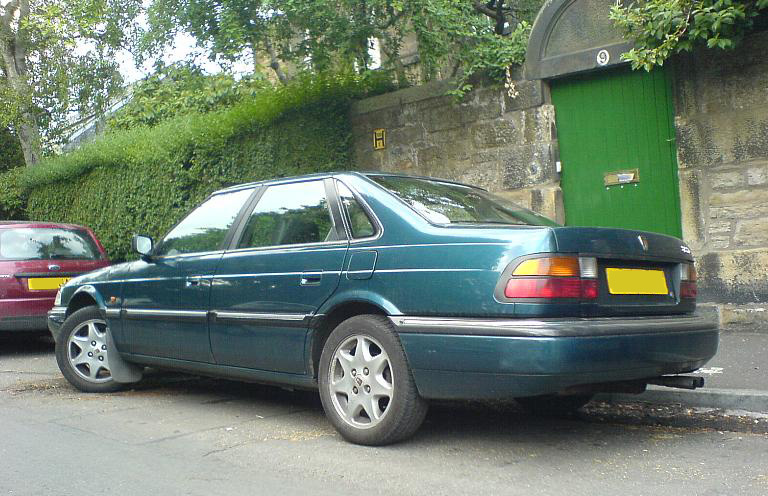
1995 Rover 825SD saloon, rear view (post-R17 facelift, but a year before minor changes including smoked rear lights)

In the autumn of 1991, the 800 was reskinned and reengineered under the R17 codename, being launched on 12 November 1991. This saw the reintroduction of the traditional Rover grille and more curvaceous bodywork. The scope of the design change was restricted by the need to retain the core XX structure, including the door structure design.

The redesign was a partial answer to major press and market criticism of the "folded paper" school of design and the quest for better aerodynamics that had led to many cars appearing very similar, especially from the front. The redesign found much favour and as a result the car's sales enjoyed a renaissance, the 800 series becoming Britain's best selling executive car in the early to mid-1990s, overtaking the Ford Granada which had been Britain's best-selling car in this sector almost continuously since its launch in 1972. Although the Granada's successor, the Scorpio, failed to sell well, mainly due to its controversial exterior design, the 800 was faced with stiff competition from 1994 in the shape of the Vauxhall Omega, as well as premium brand competitors including the BMW 5 series.

Following concerted efforts to learn from the problems that had hit the early model years, especially under the more extreme United States market and climatic conditions, quality in general had improved dramatically by this stage, but the decision to leave the US market had already been taken. However build quality problems such as trim rattles and electrical faults still remained.

The 2.0 L T16 replaced the M16 found in pre-1992 cars, and came in both normally aspirated and turbocharged forms. The 2.0 L turbo was fitted to the Vitesse and the later Vitesse Sport (1994–96), taking the place of the former 820 Turbo.

Rover's Special Vehicle Division considered building an estate version in 1992 as the 800 'Shooting Break'.

=== Coupé ===
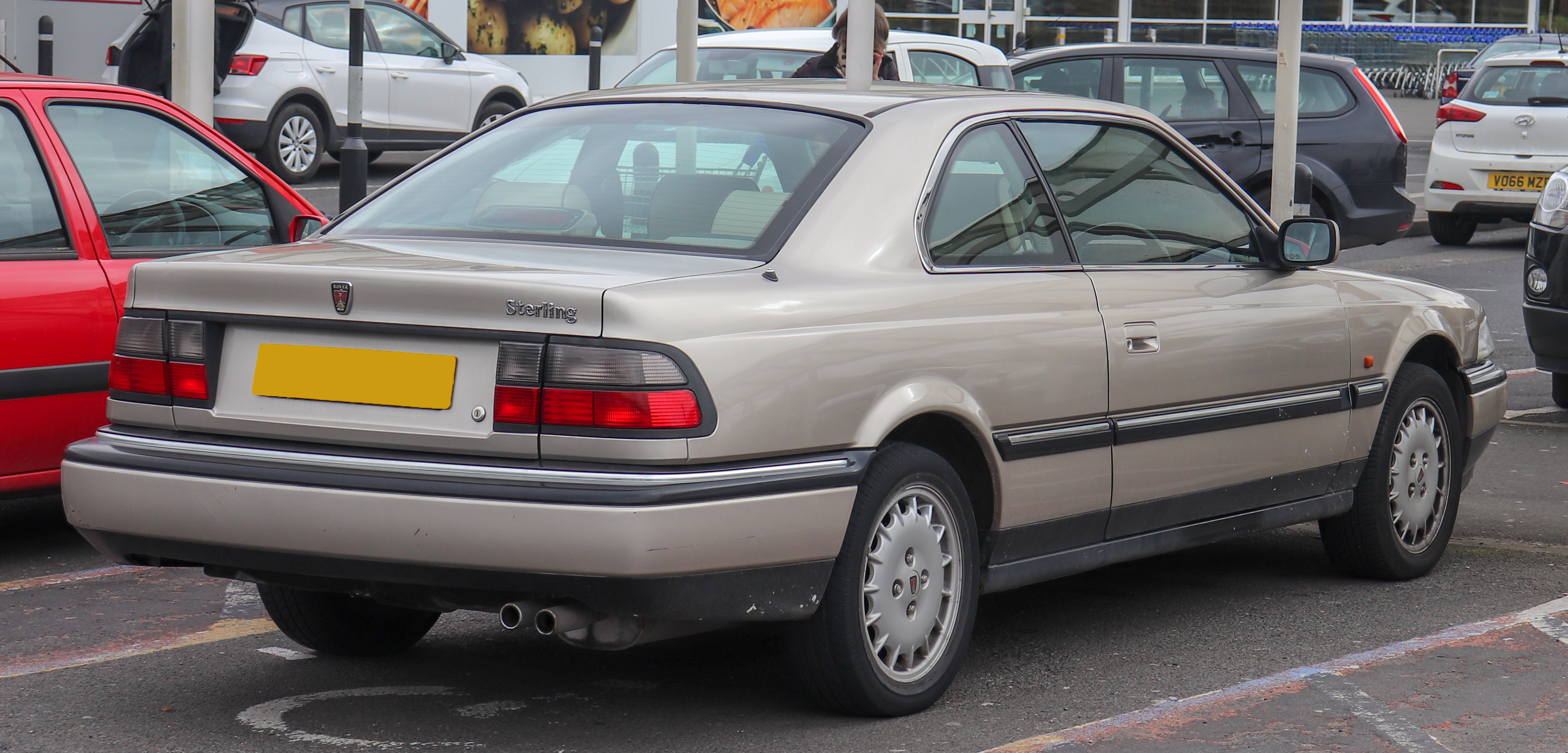
Coupé

A two-door three-box notchback coupé version was launched in early 1992, having debuted at the 1991 Motor Show. This specification had originally been developed with the American market in mind but was never sold there, with Rover having pulled out of the US market before the Coupé's launch. It was, however, sold to other export markets. Eighty percent of the interior and exterior of the 800 Coupé was finished by hand. The original Rover 800 had also formed the basis for the coupe version of the Honda Legend after its 1986 launch, but at the time Rover had decided against launching a coupé version of the 800 series. At the time there had been much press speculation that the coupé would be influenced by the MG EX-E concept car that had been shown the year before the 800's launch, but what eventually appeared was a much more conservative design.

From February 1992 until 1996, the Rover 800 Coupe came exclusively with the 2.7 Honda V6 engine and 16" Rover 'Prestige' alloys. A four-speed automatic transmission came as standard, and the car was capable of well over 130 mph.

=== 1996 minor facelift ===
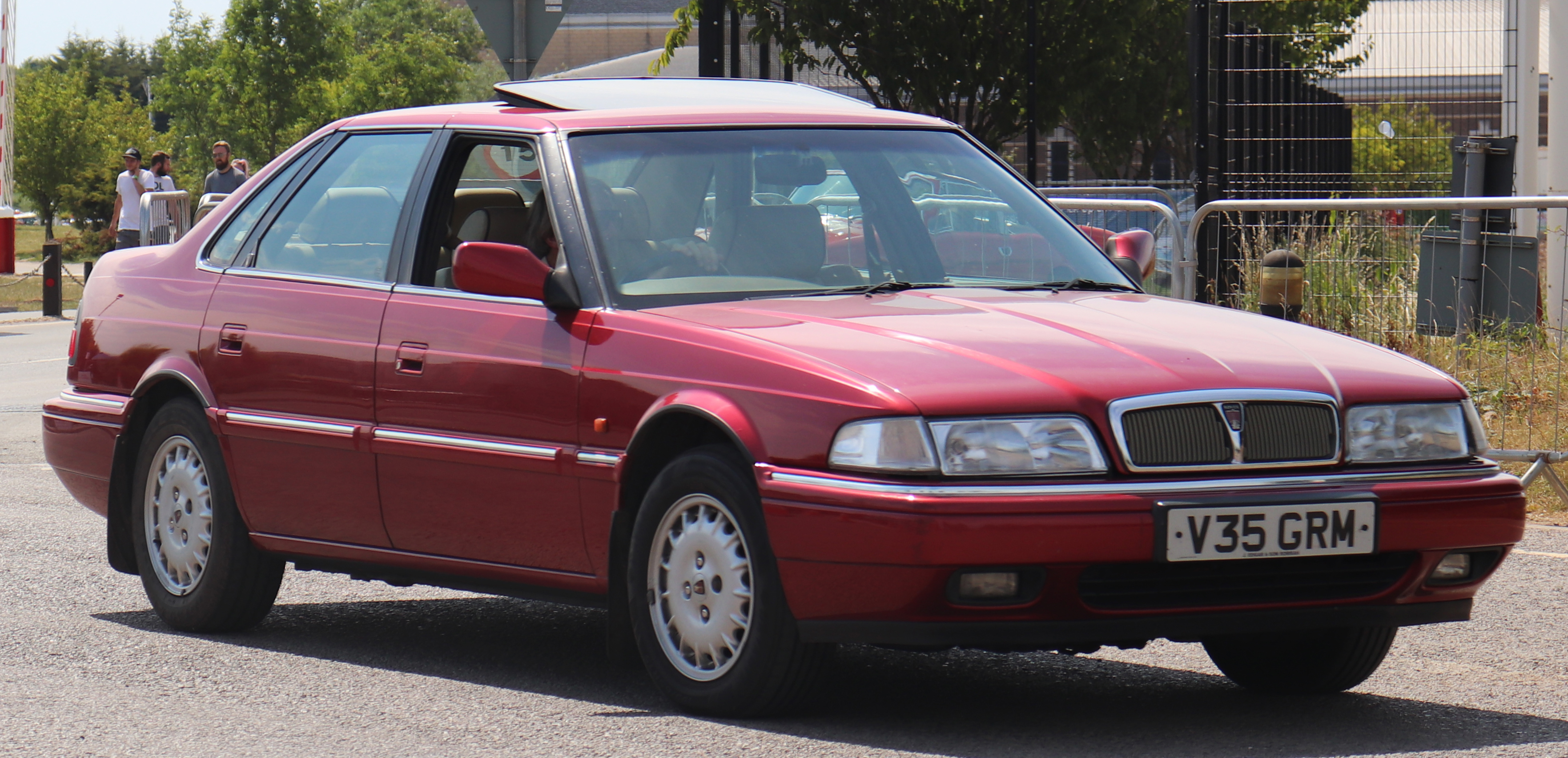
1999 820 Sterling (post-R17 facelift)

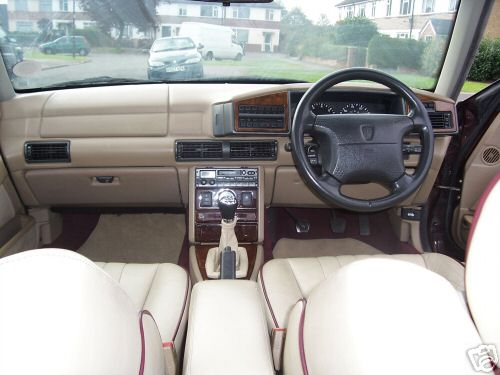
Interior of the same 820 Sterling (with non-standard gear knob) showing passenger airbag cover where pre-1994 models had a shelf

A facelift in 1996 provided few exterior changes, the most noticeable being the painting of previously black rubbing strips on all models except the coupé and the revision of the suspension system. Grille fins became silver in colour, instead of their former black. Climate control, passive immobilisation and a passenger airbag became standard, and a 6-disc CD auto-changer was fitted to all models apart from the entry-level ("i") model. Security technology was upgraded with a change from infrared to radio frequency for the remote door key. Wood finishes were expanded, with a coachwork line and "ROVER" on the door cards, accentuating the new, pleated seat finishes and deep pile rugs along with pleated leather door cards, much of which was handmade with what Rover called in its advertising "the craftsman's touch".

Post 1996 Vitesses were all "Sport" specification so the Sport badge was dropped. From 1996 on, the 2.0-litre T16 engines also used wasted spark ignition instead of distributor. Non-Sport Vitesse models have 180 bhp (134 kW), whilst the Sport has 197 bhp (147 kW).

Although the 800 had fallen behind the competition considerably (few mechanical changes were made, apart from the introduction of the Rover KV6 Engine which replaced the Honda 2.7 V6 in 1996), it was a steady seller in the home market until the spring of 1999, when it was replaced by the Rover 75.

== Reliability ==
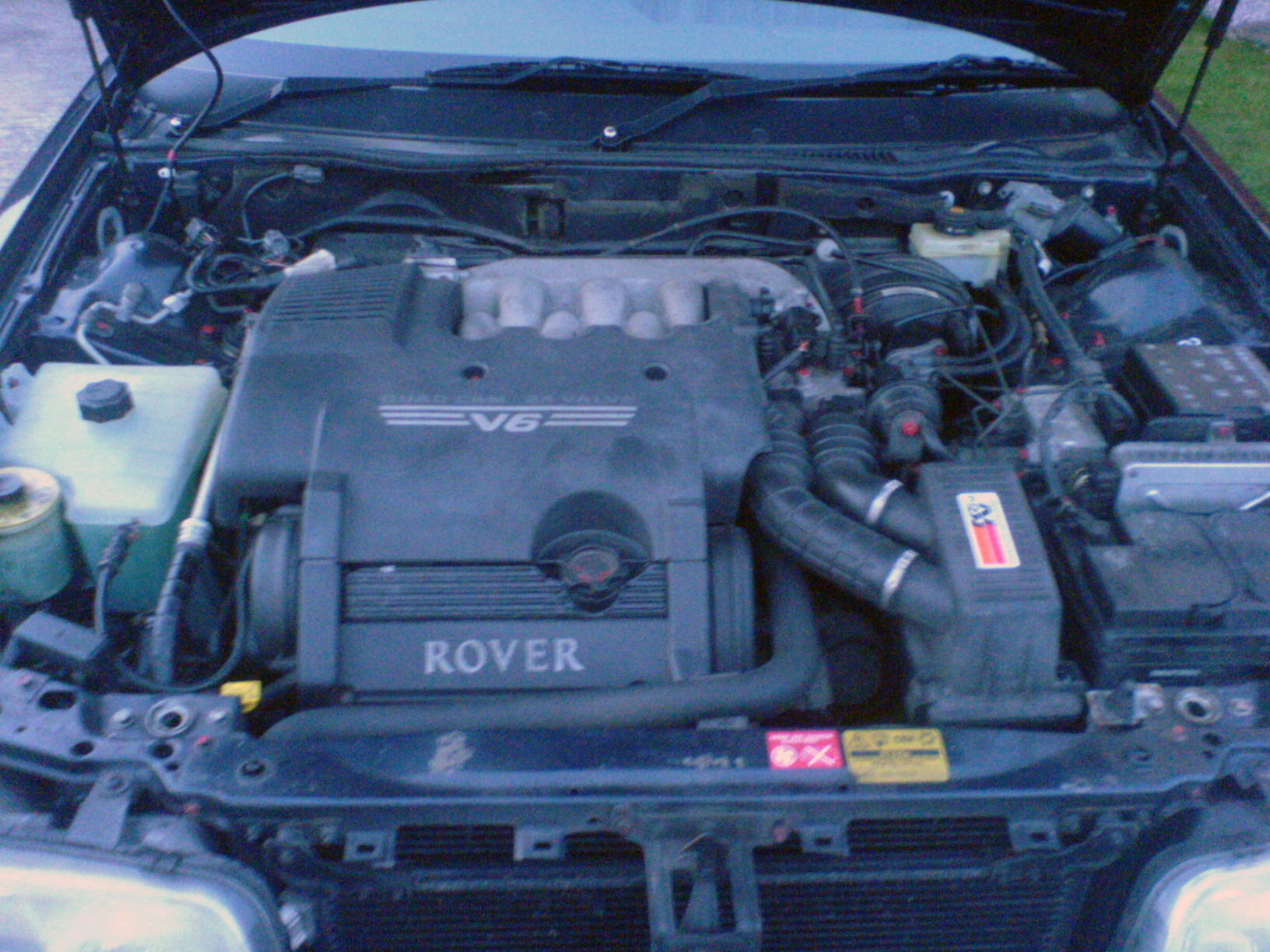
A Rover KV6 2.5 litre engine fitted to a 1998 Rover 800 Sterling

The Rover KV6 and M-series engines in the 800 series was hampered by reliability problems and head gasket failures. Rover at the time, with no understanding of the problems, simply replaced the engines. In many cases repair would not have been an option due to liner problems. The KV6 engine was in most cases mated to a JATCO gearbox which also in some cases suffered from reliability issues. This was sometimes due to incorrect gearbox fluid changes.

The Rover 820 Vitesse in most guises suffered from problems with gearbox bearings because of the large amount of power from the 2-litre turbo engine. The bearings can be replaced with more durable steel caged bearings.

== Model designations ==
Unlike many other manufacturers who used numerical model naming systems, Rover never settled on a permanent standard for the majority of their cars. However, for the following designations are an approximate guide:

- 820 – 4-cylinder 8-valve carburetted models (Rover O8)
- 820e – 4-cylinder 16-valve single point injected models (Rover M16e)
- 820i – 4-cylinder 16-valve multi point injected models (Rover M16i) Came in naturally aspirated form and turbocharged (Turbocharged variant fitted to later 820 Turbo)
- 825i – pre-1988 6-cylinder models (Honda C25A)
- 827i – post-1988 6-cylinder and US models (Honda C27A)
- Sterling – for most markets (except North America), luxury flagship model (Honda C25A then C27A after 1988)
- Vitesse – for most markets, sports flagship model (Honda C27A)

Following the 1992 R17 facelift, the convention was simplified to:

- 820i/Si/SLi/Sterling – 4-cylinder 16-valve multi point injected models (Rover T16) Came in naturally aspirated and Turbocharged variants for the Vitesse.
- 825D/SD – 4-cylinder diesel models (VM Motori 425)
- 827i/Si/SLi/Sterling – 6-cylinder models (Honda C27A – before 1996)
- 825i/Si/SLi/Sterling – 6-cylinder models (Rover KV6 – after 1996)
- Sterling – for most markets (except North America), luxury flagship model
- Vitesse – for most markets, sports flagship model (Rover T16)

== Users ==
The 800 was a keystone of the British government's car fleet throughout its life, following a tradition of using British-made Rover and Jaguar models. Tony Blair owned an early 800 soon after its launch, just a few years after becoming an MP. The car was also used by many British police forces as police cars. The fictional radio DJ Alan Partridge drives a White Gold Vitesse Fastback in the sitcom I'm Alan Partridge.

== Motorsport ==
On 6 June 1988, rally driver Tony Pond became the first person to complete a lap of the TT motorcycle course at an average speed of over 100 mph (160 km/h) in a car – a Rover 827 Vitesse, standard apart from safety features and racing tyres. Pond's record remained unbeaten until 2011.

== Production figures ==
Rover 800 production peaked in 1987, its first full year, but had dipped sharply by 1991 as a result of the recession and the fact that it was being replaced by a facelifted model towards the end of the year. By 1998, yearly production figures had fallen to just 6,500. A total of 317,126 cars were built by the time production ended in 1998.

Year	Production
1986	15,609
1987	54,434
1988	48,634
1989	35,387
1990	29,460
1991 (pre-facelift)	10,007
1991 (post-facelift)	2,961
1992	28,136
1993	28,354
1994	21,802
1995	13,311
1996	11,400
1997	11,131
1998	6,500
