= Morris Ital =

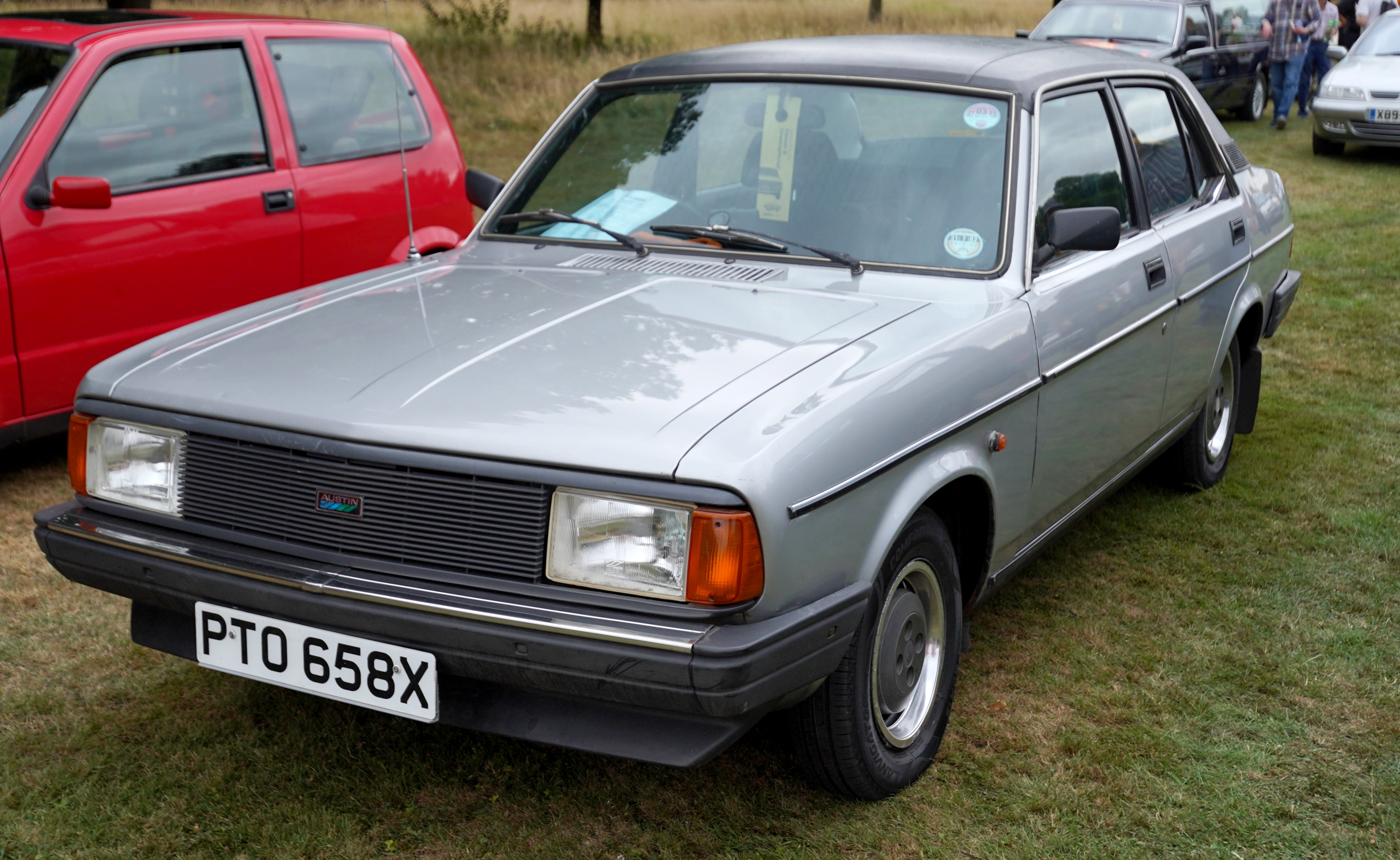

Overview
- Manufacturer: British Leyland
- Also called: Morris Marina (Portugal); Huandu CAC6430 (China)
- Production: July 1980 – August 1984; 175,276 produced 1998–1999 (China)
- Assembly: United Kingdom: Cowley, Oxford (Cowley plant: 1980–1982); United Kingdom: Longbridge, Birmingham (Longbridge plant: 1982–1984); Portugal: Setúbal (IMA); China: Chengdu (Chengdu Auto Works)

Body and chassis
- Class: Mid-size car/Large family car
- Body style: 4-door saloon 5-door estate 2-door pick-up 2-door van

Powertrain
- Engine: 1275 cc A-series OHV I4; 1695 cc O-series I4; 1994 cc O-series I4; 1489 cc B-series diesel I4 (Portugal)
- Transmission: 4-speed manual 3-speed automatic

Dimensions
- Wheelbase: 2,440 mm (96.1 in)
- Length: 4,340 mm (170.9 in) (saloon), 4,380 mm (172.4 in) (estate)
- Width: 1,640 mm (64.6 in)
- Height: 1,420 mm (55.9 in) (saloon), 1,440 mm (56.7 in) (estate)

Chronology
- Predecessor: Morris Marina
- Successor: Austin Montego

The Morris Ital is a medium-sized car that was built by the Austin-Morris (later Austin Rover) division of British Leyland (BL) from 1980 to 1984. Essentially a major facelift of the Morris Marina which it succeeded, it was available in a variety of bodystyles.

== Design and launch ==
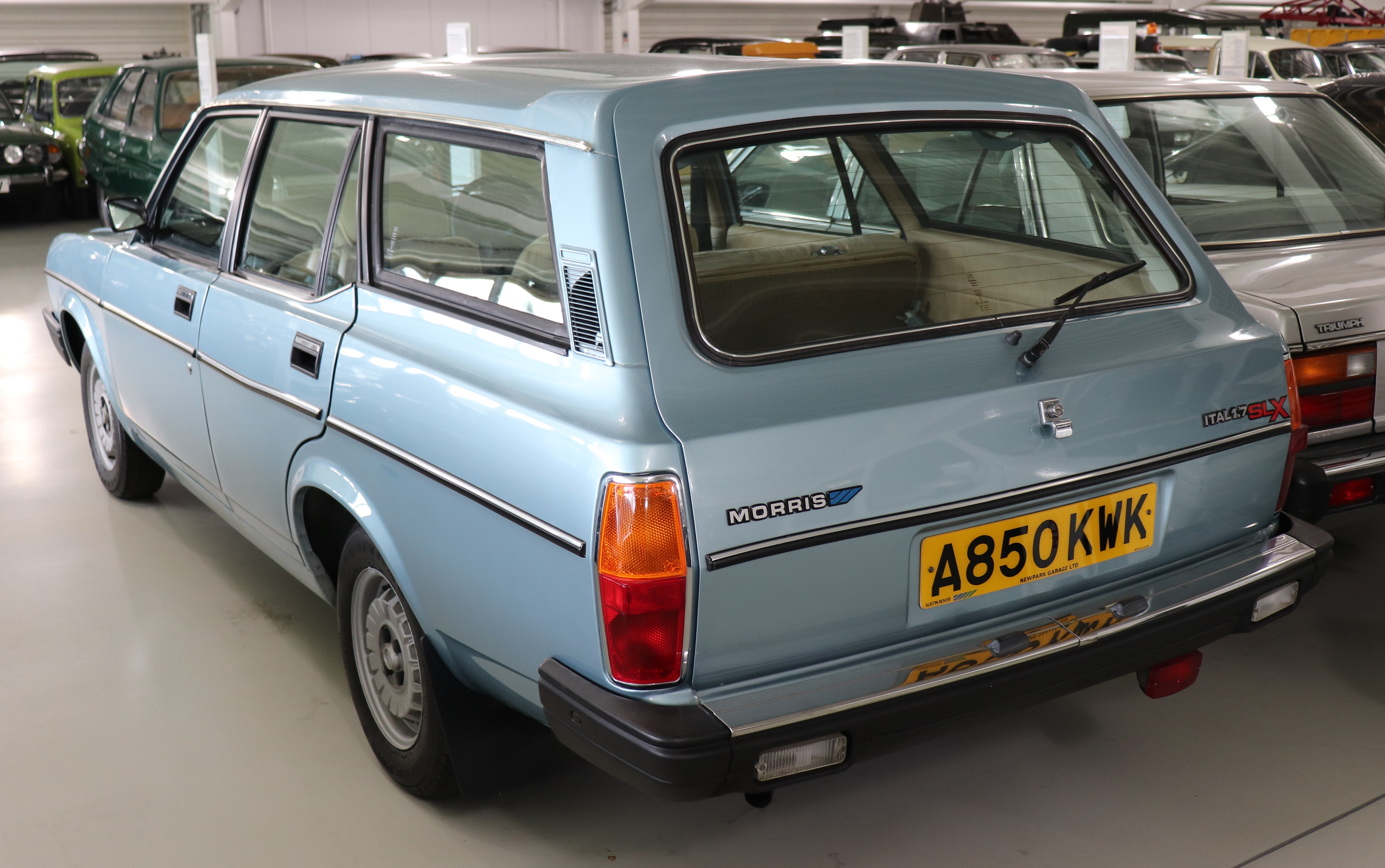
1984 Morris Ital SLX rear

The Ital was given the design code ADO73 F/L (as it was considered a facelift of the Series 2 ADO73 Marina launched in 1976) and was first launched on 1 July 1980. It took its name from Giorgetto Giugiaro's Italdesign studio, which had been employed by BL to manage the re-engineering of the Morris Marina, produced by the company since 1971. Although BL's advertising emphasised the car's connection with the Italian design house, Italdesign did not have a direct role in the styling of the new car, which had been handled in-house by Harris Mann. With a very limited budget to work with, Mann managed to give the car a more contemporary look through new door handles, prodigious use of plastic mouldings at the front, and very few sheet metal changes (all of the Ital's front body panels are interchangeable with those of the Marina). Saloons gained a restyled boot lid and much larger rear tail lights. The estates were almost unchanged at the rear compared to their Marina predecessors.

Italdesign had been involved in a consultancy role, to help design new tooling and assembly methods, and work out how to integrate the altered parts of the new car into the existing Marina production chain. As such, despite bearing the studio's name the Ital is absent from lists of styling jobs handled by the firm. It was originally planned to brand the car as the Morris Marina Ital but, for most markets, the Marina name was dropped on the orders of British Leyland CEO, Michael Edwardes, and only the Ital name was used.

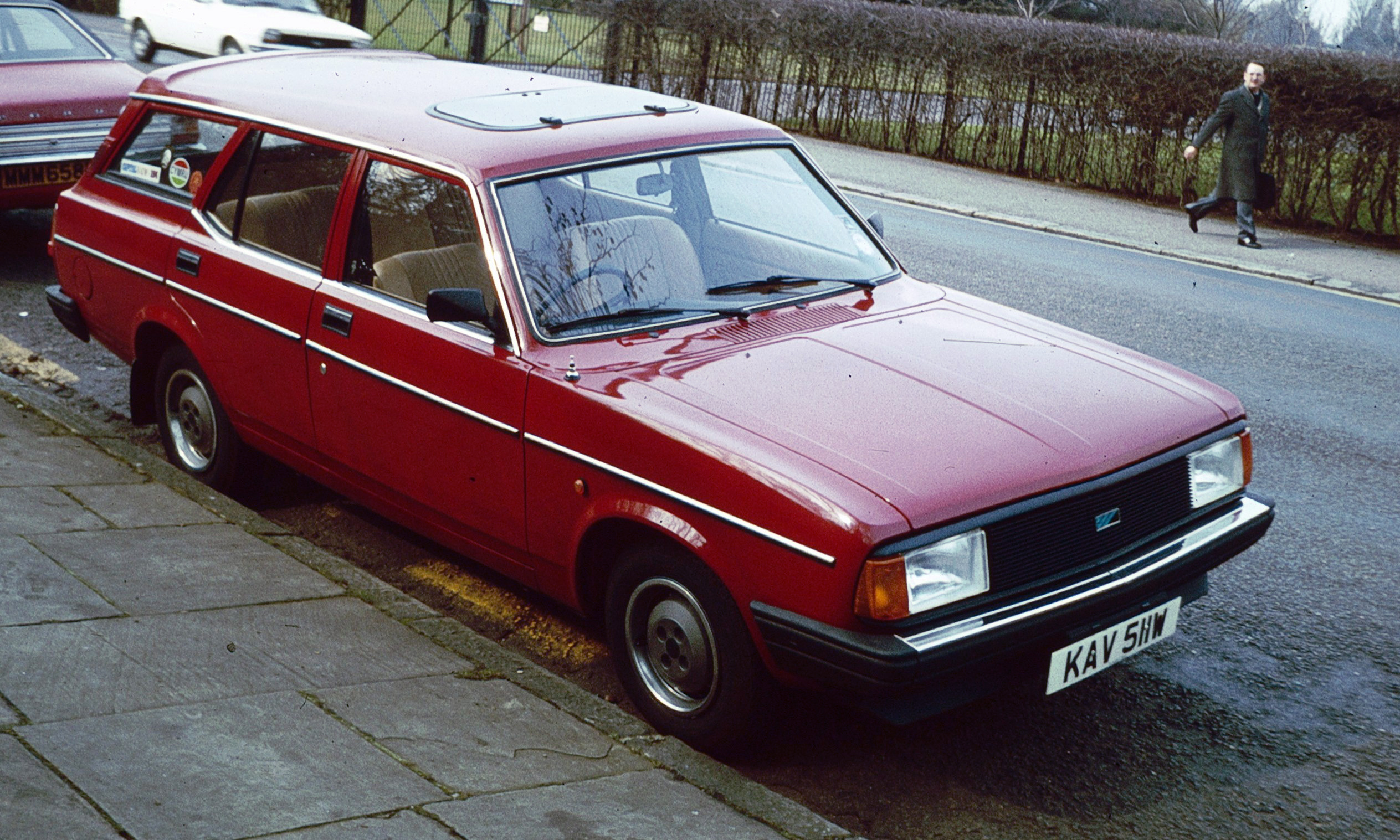
A Morris Ital Estate seen in Cambridge in 1981.

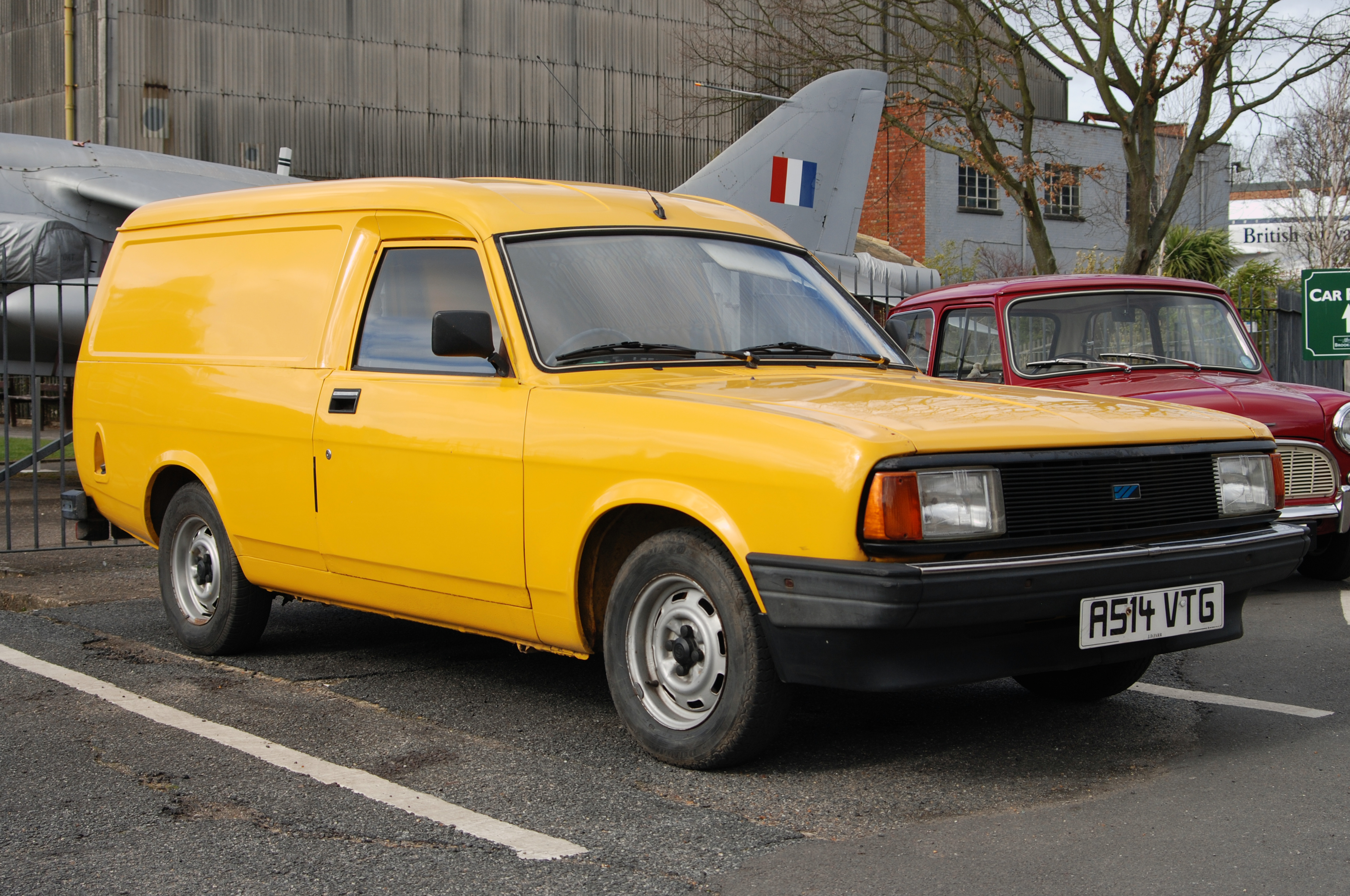
1983 Morris Ital Van

The Ital had revised exterior styling, but retained the Marina's 1.3- and 1.7-litre petrol engines and rear-wheel drive chassis. The dashboard and interior of the Marina were also carried over largely unaltered, including the main fascia panel, which faced 'away' from the driver. The van versions finally adopted this fascia in place of the austere single-dial dashboard that was shared with the larger Leyland Sherpa vans. The Marina's coupé variant was not produced in Ital form, but the four door saloon, the five-door estate, and the pickup and van versions, were carried over from the Marina range.

From October 1980 an automatic version of the Ital was available with the 2.0-litre O-Series power unit, as the range topping 2.0 HLS. With a very short production run, only about 1,000 models were sold and it remains the rarest Ital model. In November 1981, all HL and HLS models were fitted with upgraded interior trim.

In 1982 the Ital production line was moved from Cowley to Longbridge; this was to allow the former to be refitted for the upcoming start of production of the Austin Maestro, and the Ital's ultimate replacement – the Austin Montego. Finally, in September of that year, a revised Ital range was introduced. The L and 2.0-litre models were dropped, and the HL and HLS were replaced by the SL and SLX models. Front suspension was changed to telescopic front dampers across the range, and parabolic rear springs were also fitted, together with additional soundproofing and improved trim.

Thus cropped, the range then consisted of the 1.3 SL and SLX saloon, 1.3 SL estate, 1.7 SLX saloon, and the 1.7 SL saloon and estate. The saloon models were dropped in February 1984, with the estate models remaining in production until the summer of that year.

During the 1970s British Leyland had been working on the development of an all-new car to replace the Morris Marina and the Ital was only ever intended as a stop gap replacement between the demise of the Marina and the launch of its replacement in the form of the Austin Montego, which did not happen until April 1984.

== Portuguese assembly ==
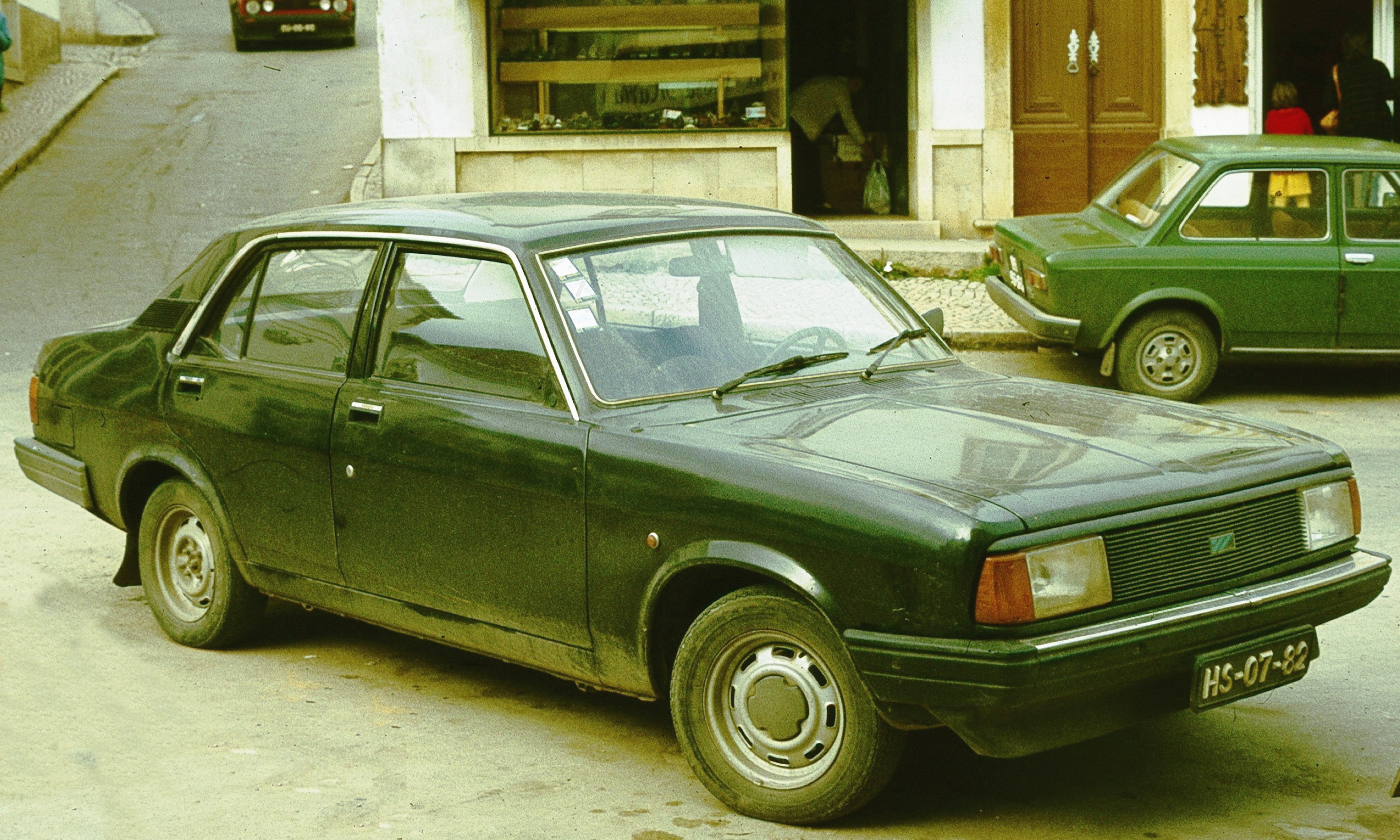
The Ital was also assembled in Portugal, where it retained the predecessor model's 'Marina' designation. The car in this picture has an early 1980s Portuguese registration plate.

Although most Itals were manufactured in the United Kingdom, there were also Portuguese assembled Itals which were all equipped with the ancient 1.5-litre B-series diesel engine, producing 37 hp. Portuguese Itals retained the "Marina" badge (actually "Morris Marina 1.5 D") and were the only Marina/Itals to receive a diesel engine of any kind.

The British Leyland factory in Setúbal (IMA) then switched to producing the Mini Moke.

== Sales ==
The Ital sold reasonably well in Britain during the start of the 1980s, as it offered a competitive asking price and low running costs. The Ital's technology differed from many of its contemporaries, such as the Opel Ascona/Vauxhall Cavalier, as well as the Talbot Alpine, which all used front wheel drive. It managed sales of 175,276 cars of all derivatives.

After the introduction of the Opel Ascona C / Vauxhall Cavalier Mark II in August 1981, the Ital and Ford's Cortina (and later Sierra) were the only European mass volume cars in the sector to retain rear wheel drive.

== Demise of Morris ==
The Ital was the last production car to wear the Morris badge, although there was a Morris badged van version of the Metro produced until 1984.

The saloon was dropped from the line in February 1984 with the van and estate completing outgoing contracts for another six months, until they too were axed. From this point, the Morris marque was kept alive solely by the Metro van, and three years later the Morris badge had finally been consigned to history after 75 years, when it was removed from the van version of the Metro.

The Ital's successor was the Austin Montego, launched in April 1984 as a four-door saloon, with a five-door estate arriving in October 1984, the van versions being succeeded by the van bodystyle of the Austin Maestro.

== Later production in China ==
After production in the United Kingdom ceased, the Ital's production tooling was sold to the Chengdu Auto Works, a company belonging to the First Auto Works Group in Sichuan, China. In 1998, the Ital estate (using a locally made chassis) reappeared there, under the name Huandu CAC6430 (Chinese: 环都). Van and pick up variants were also produced. Chengdu Auto Works is thought to have closed down in May 1999.

== Reputation ==
Already outdated by the time it was launched, and continually saddled with build quality problems, the Ital soon gained a poor reputation. Although the Ital's reliability was never an issue, as it used tried and tested components, it was said to have similar rust problems to its predecessor, the Morris Marina. Despite being designated as a successor to the Marina, surviving Itals are rarer than Marinas today on UK roads due to lower overall production numbers. As the value of Morris Itals plummeted in the late 1980s and the 1990s, hundreds, possibly thousands, of functioning Itals were bought by Morris Minor owners to be cannibalised for their 1275cc A+ engines and transmissions as the Ital was the only rear-wheel drive car to be fitted with them. As of 2023, there are only 56 Morris Itals still taxed and on the roads in the UK, with another 133 Itals declared SORN (Statutory Off-Road Notice).
