= Morris Marina =

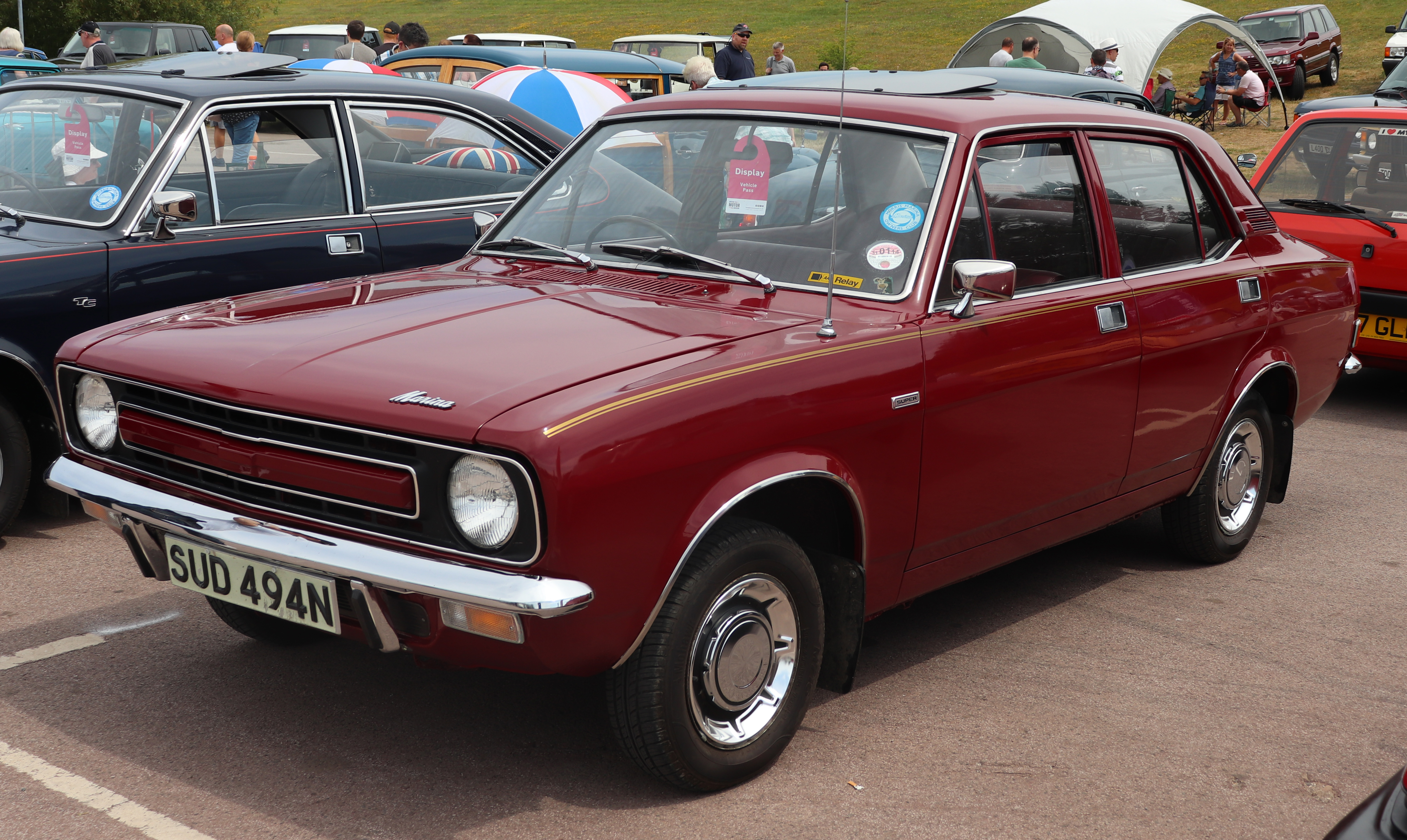

Overview
- Manufacturer: British Leyland
- Also called: Austin Marina (South Africa and North America); Leyland Marina (Australia); Morris 1700 (New Zealand); Morris 575 (New Zealand)
- Production: 1971–1980; 1972–1981 (New Zealand)
- Assembly: United Kingdom: Cowley, Oxford (Cowley plant); Australia: Zetland (Leyland Australia); New Zealand: Panmure (NZMC); South Africa: Blackheath (Leykor); Malaysia: Shah Alam (AMI); Malta: Marsa (Malta Car Assembly)
- Designer: Roy Haynes, Harris Mann

Body and chassis
- Class: Small family car
- Body style: 4-door saloon 5-door estate car 3-door coupé 2-door coupé utility (pick up); 2-door van

Powertrain
- Engine: 1.3 L A-Series I4; 1.5 L E-Series I4 (Australia); 1.7 L O-Series I4 (1978–1980); 1.75 L E-Series I4 (Australia); 1.8 L B-Series I4 (1971–1978); 2.6 L E-Series I6 (Australia/South Africa); 1.5 L B-Series diesel I4
- Transmission: 4-speed manual 3-speed automatic

Dimensions
- Wheelbase: 96 in (2,438 mm)
- Length: 166 in (4,216 mm) (4-door); 163 in (4,140 mm) (2-door); 167.5 in (4,254 mm) (estate)
- Width: 64 in (1,626 mm)
- Height: 56.125 in (1,426 mm)

Chronology
- Predecessor: Morris Minor; Morris 1100/1300; Morris Oxford Farina
- Successor: Morris Ital

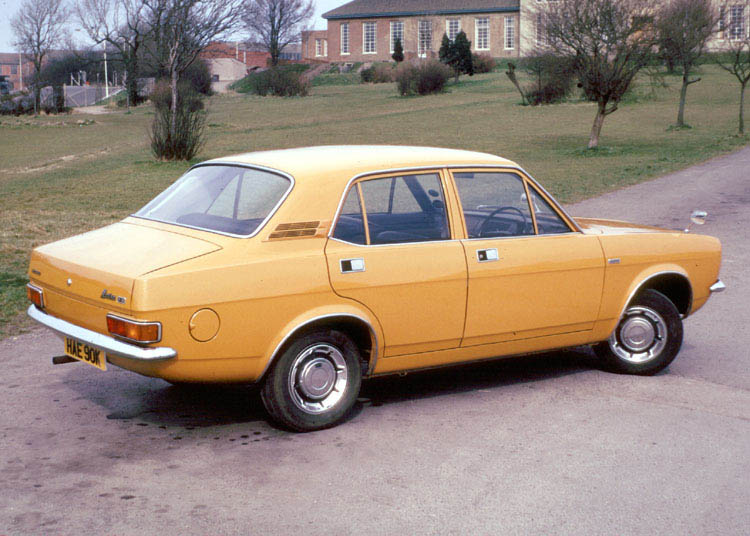
1973 Morris Marina 4-door saloon in England

1971 Morris Marina 2-door coupé. This grille identifies the 1.3-litre version

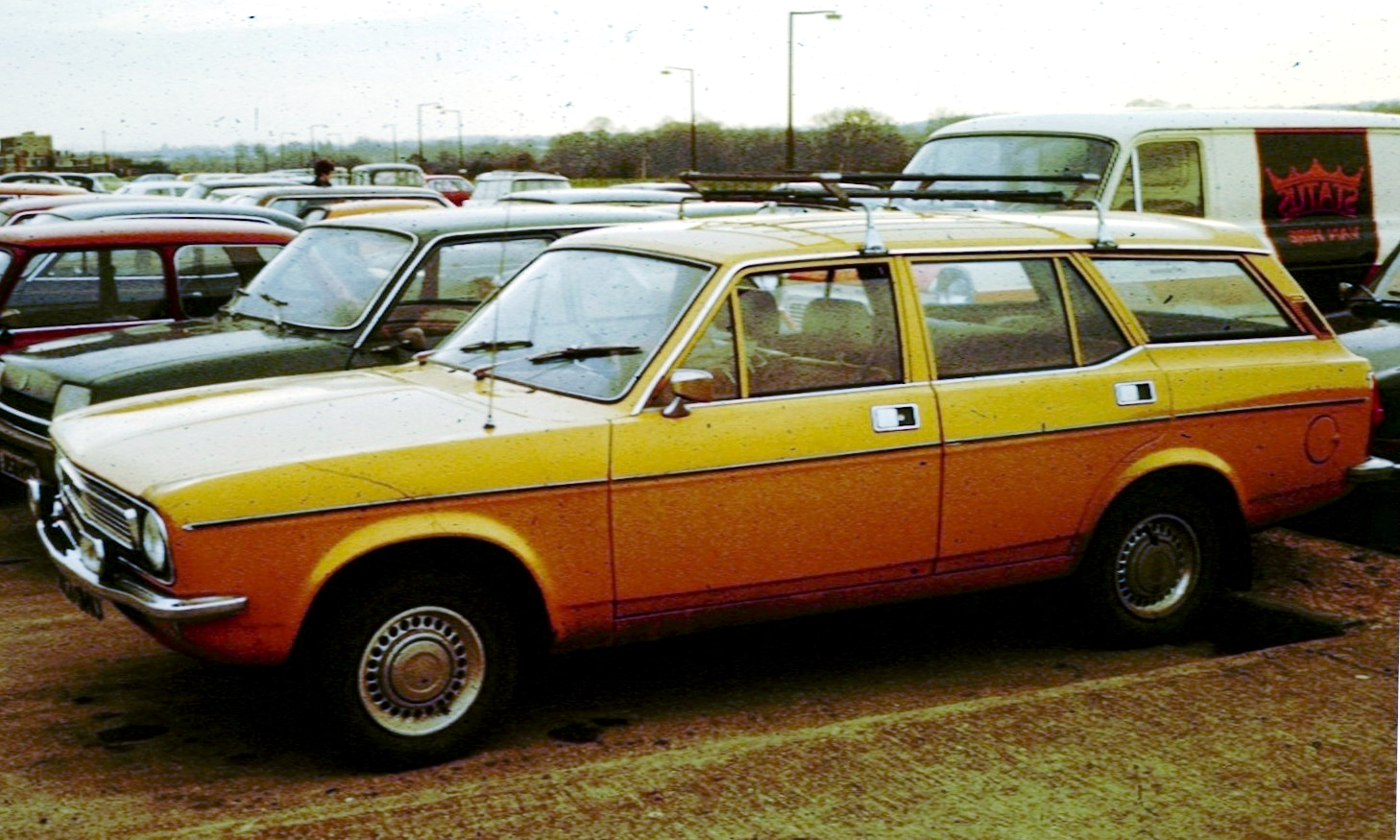
1976 Morris Marina Estate in England

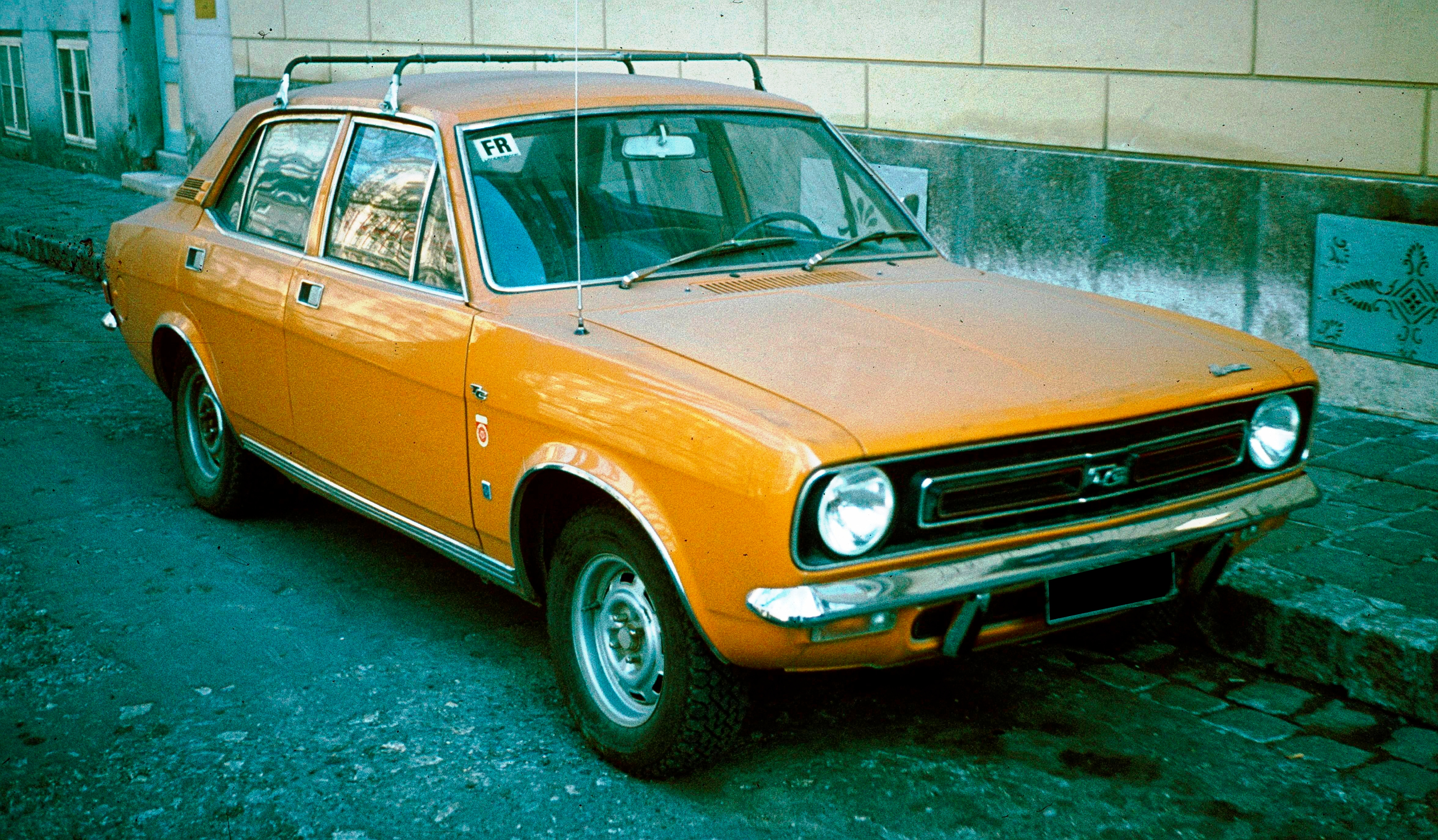
1971 Morris Marina 1.8 TC 4-door saloon. The 1.8 TC was marketed as the sporting version. The high visibility "safety colour" of this example was fashionable in the 1970s.

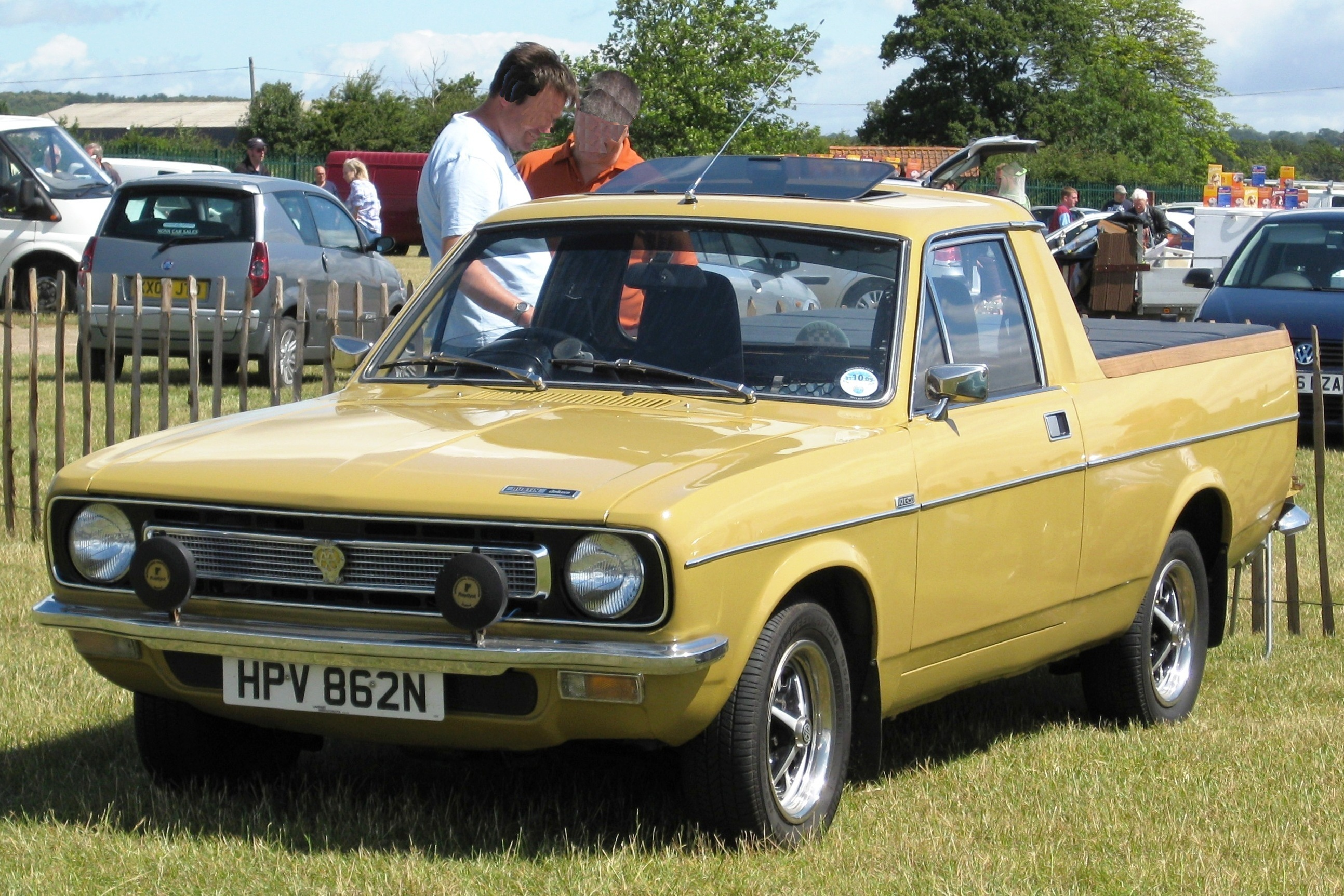
1975 Marina Pick-up. This variant was never a big seller.

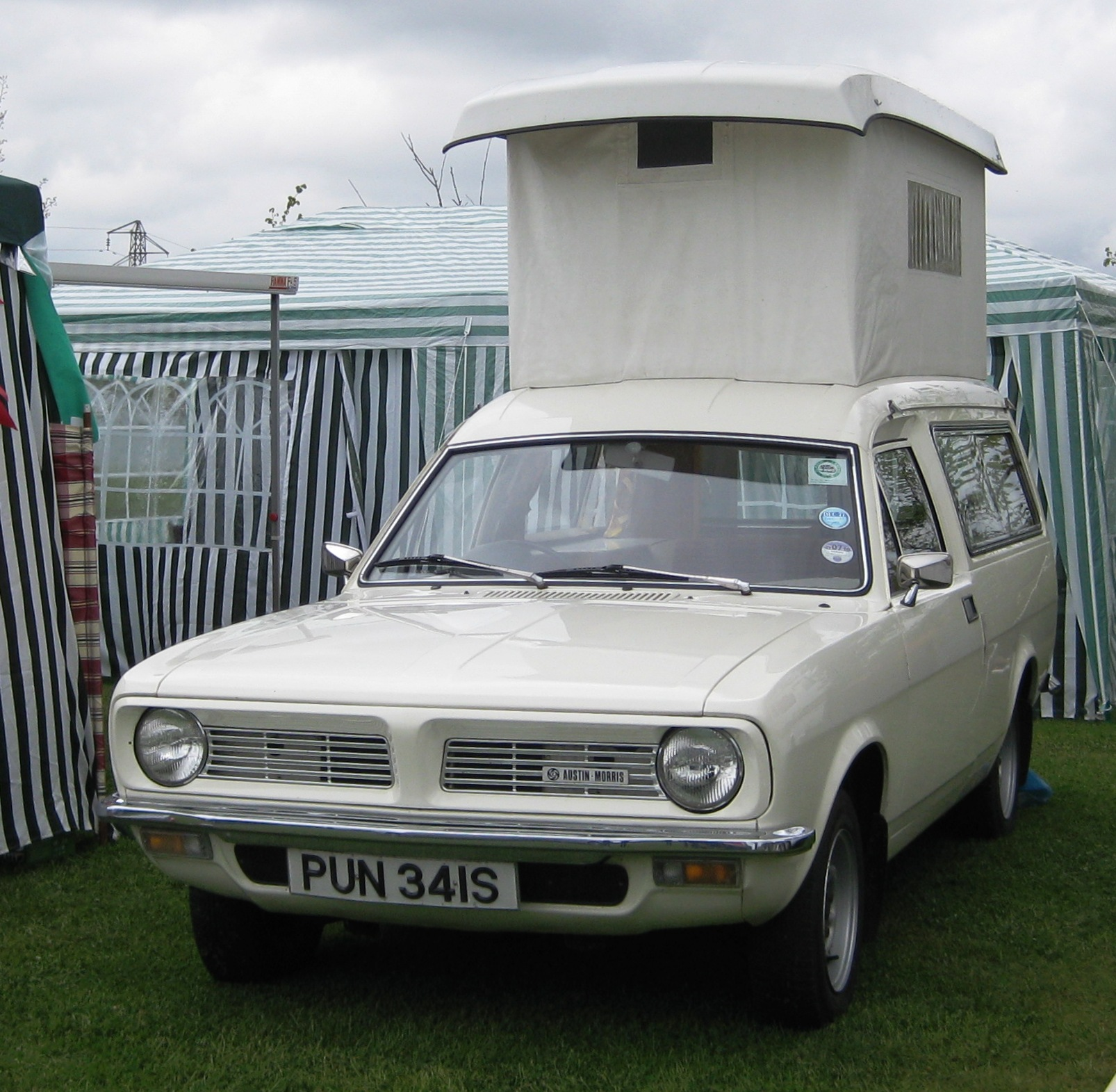
1977 Marina van converted into a motor caravan. During this period, the company decided that all commercial vehicles produced by its Austin-Morris division should be badged as Austins. How this was applied to motor caravan conversions (SunTor) of those commercial vehicles is apparent from the "Austin-Morris" badge on the front of this one.

The Morris Marina is a small family car that was manufactured by the Austin-Morris division of British Leyland (BL) from 1971 until 1980. It served to replace both the Morris Minor and Morris Oxford in the Morris product line. The Marina was also sold in some markets as the Austin Marina, the Leyland Marina and the Morris 1700. It has a front-engine, rear-wheel-drive layout and was produced with saloon car, estate car, coupé, pickup truck, and van body styles.

It was a popular car in Britain throughout its production life, although it rarely came close to challenging its main rival, the Ford Cortina. The car was exported throughout the world, including North America, and assembled in Australia, New Zealand, South Africa and Malaysia. A total of 1.2 million were built.

According to various sources, the Marina ranks among the worst cars ever built.

The 1980 replacement for the Marina, the Ital, was the same car with only mild styling changes. It was only fully replaced by the Austin Montego in 1984.

British Leyland sold the Marina alongside the 1969 Austin Maxi, which shared the same market segment but used front-wheel-drive and had a hatchback body, and the 1973 Austin Allegro, which used front-wheel-drive and more adventurous styling.

== Development ==
The Marina was developed under the ADO28 codename. The impetus for its development came when truck and bus builder (along with the Triumph and Rover cars) Leyland Motors merged with British Motor Holdings (BMH) in 1968, thus forming British Leyland. BMH was the corporate parent of the two biggest car manufacturers in the UK, Austin and Morris. The new BL management, made largely from ex-Leyland Motors staff, were shocked to learn that, apart from the Austin Maxi (then entering the final stages of development) and a tentative design for a replacement for the Mini (the 9X), BMH had no new cars under development.

The company's products aimed at the mass-market consisted of the Morris Minor, dating from 1948, the Austin Cambridge/Morris Oxford 'Farina' series launched in 1959, and the 1100/1300 range of mid-sized Austin and Morris saloons that were already a decade old. BL rapidly implemented a plan to develop a replacement for both the Minor and the Farina models that could be produced as quickly as possible and would be on sale for no more than five years until a genuinely "all new" product could be launched in its place.

To try to introduce some clear distinctions between its multiple brands BL decided to release conservative, traditionally engineered cars under the Morris name, and sell more adventurous cars as Austins, or even as new marques. Specifically, this meant that Austins used the groundbreaking transverse-engine front-wheel-drive layout developed for the Austin Mini by Alec Issigonis. It was thus decided that the ADO28 would be badged as a Morris.

The Marina would use a conventional rear-wheel drive, live rear axle drive-train as found on other popular mass-market cars such as the Ford Escort, Ford Cortina and Vauxhall Viva. This strategy was also intended to improve sales in BL's export markets. Commonwealth markets such as South Africa, Australia and New Zealand were large buyers of BL products, but the innovative BMC cars were considered too fragile and complex for use in such countries, as well as being fitted exclusively with small, low-powered engines. As a result, the Marina was unadventurous but simple, making use of existing BMC and Triumph Motor Company components from their extensive parts bins.

The car was designed by Roy Haynes, the same man who designed the Ford Cortina Mark II (launched in 1966), with which it shares stylistic similarities and dimensions. Lacking the budget to develop two cars to compete directly with the Escort and the Cortina, the makers sized the ADO28 to compete with both, although the Marina ended up being only marginally smaller than the Ford Cortina Mark II. Haynes' original idea was to produce the car in coupé and saloon versions with the coupé pitched as a premium, sporting version, in a similar mould to the Ford Capri – a popular coupé based on Cortina running gear – to appeal to younger buyers, while the saloon was for the crucial company car market and families. Harris Mann, Haynes' assistant, designed the door handles, which he would later copy for the Austin Allegro and Triumph TR7.

Haynes also attempted to put forward a system that many manufacturers now use: a common floor pan shared between models. The Marina was the first car design that used this idea. Although this idea carried great potential benefits for a company selling cars under numerous different brands across multiple market sectors it was looked on as too radical by the management of British Leyland and Triumph designer Harry Webster was drafted in to push the project forward. Roy Haynes soon left the company, and Harris Mann replaced him as chief designer.

The British Leyland Board decided to build the Marina at the ex-Morris Motors plant at Cowley in Oxford, which was largely still as it was in the 1920s. The plant had insufficient capacity – British manufacturers had difficulties in meeting demand in the post-war years – which increased design and production costs significantly, since Leyland had to rebuild the plant.

The Marina was originally designed to use the E-series overhead cam BMC engines. These engines had a number of design problems. A modular engine design, the E series had standard bores, with capacity increased by using either more cylinders or larger strokes. However, small-capacity sixes fell out of favour as post-war Britain became increasingly affluent.

To increase capacity, BL preferred increasing stroke, which added little to the cost of production. This resulted in a tall engine. It was not possible to slant the engine, because of the location of the fuel pump. Furthermore, the engine had to be "siamesed", that is, the water jacket was shared between pairs of cylinders. These factors contributed to overheating and oil burning in the Austin Maxi, and so the board decided to adopt the more reliable A and B- series engines for indigenous production. (Australia and South Africa continued with the E series.). However, the body had already been designed, so the Marina was forever cursed with a "full nappy" rear-end styling, needed to even the lines between the necessarily bloated front and the rear.

The engine assembly line was bifurcated by a municipal road; Leyland had to build an overpass, further increasing cost. The Birmingham local authority then agreed to sell the road to Leyland after the overpass had been completed. This increased the cost even further.

Numerous redesigns also meant that the final design of the Marina was rushed, as the project's final deadline grew near. The car went from design stage to production in just 18 months. Consequently, the board decided to cut costs and abandon Macpherson struts in favour of an old design from the Morris Minor. They also abandoned a project to design a new 4-speed BMC gearbox. As a further cost-cutting measure the coupé version of the Marina would now use the same front doors as the saloon version. This produced significant cost savings in tooling and assembly, but left the coupé as obvious styling derivative of the saloon rather than having a different, more sporting image as Roy Haynes had originally proposed. This made it impossible to pitch the coupé as a superior product, and so it was decided that the 2-door coupé version of the Marina would be the cheaper of the two body styles, with the 1.3-litre model directly replacing the entry-level 2-door version of the Morris Minor and competing with the 2-door saloon versions of the Ford Escort and the Hillman Avenger.

Meanwhile, the 1.8-litre coupé models had no direct predecessor in the BL range and the closest equivalents were the sporting Ford Capri and the new Vauxhall Firenza. This gave the coupé a rather conflicted image – the sporty bodystyle led many buyers and testers to have expectations of the Marina coupé that the final product was never intended to meet, being mechanically identical to the standard saloon version. It was less confusing with the saloons; the 1.3-litre saloon replaced the 4-door Minor, the 1.8-litre version superseded the Austin and Morris Farina saloons and the 1.8-litre Marina estate did the same for the outgoing estate versions of the Farina. The dashboard also suffered from being ergonomically illogical, with the radio and warning light controls facing away from the driver towards the passenger seat.

The indigenous engines were the venerable A-Series and B-Series units in 1.3- and 1.8-litre capacities, respectively, which drove rear wheels through a live axle. It featured torsion bar suspension at the front, leaf-spring suspension at the rear. An estate (station wagon) came in 1972, 18 months after the saloon and coupé. Five body styles were available all in all: saloon, estate, coupé, pickup, and van. For extra performance, TC versions were equipped with a twin carburettor engine similar to that in the MG MGB for extra performance. These could be fitted with a body kit from BL Special Tuning that added front and rear spoilers, alloy wheels, extra lighting and other details. A 1.5-litre diesel version, using an engine developed from the B-Series, was offered in a few European countries where the tax rates favoured diesels. With no more than 37 or 40 hp on offer depending on the source, performance was often lethargic; 3,870 diesels were built between 1977 and 1980. They were never sold in Britain, where diesel engines were almost unheard of in passenger cars.

== Launch and subsequent updates ==
The new car was launched on the domestic market on 27 April 1971, with a night shift added at the Cowley plant in May 1971. At that time the manufacturers reported they were producing 2,000 cars per week, projecting over-optimistically to increase this to 5,000 cars per week by the end of 1971. Nevertheless, eleven months after launch, on 29 March 1972, the 100,000th Marina, a 1.8TC version, emerged from the Cowley plant and by February 1973 the company was able to announce that 250,000 Marinas had already been built in less than two years. The Marina continued in production until 1980, when it was replaced by the Morris Ital (an updated version of the Marina) which soldiered on until 1984, when the Morris marque was axed and the Austin badge featured on the Montego that replaced it, signalling the end of the Morris brand after more than 70 years. (With the discontinuation of the Morris 18-22 – also sold as an Austin and Wolseley – the Marina car and the Ital were the only non-commercial vehicles sold with the Morris badge after 1975).

In Australia and South Africa it was known as the Leyland Marina, in New Zealand as the Morris 1.7 (for 1979–81, in facelifted O-Series form) and in North America as the Austin Marina.

The car was popular with families and undemanding car buyers and was available in the typical BL colours of the day – Russet Brown, Harvest Gold, Limeflower Green, Midnight Blue, Teal Blue, Blaze Orange, Damask Red and a characteristically 1970s purple called Black Tulip. It was intended to compete with the generally similar Ford Cortina (and to some extent the smaller Escort); the Vauxhall Viva and later the larger Cavalier; as well as the Hillman Avenger and Hunter from Chrysler UK. It shared its basic styling with all these cars, adopting a supposedly transatlantic look that took elements of car styling from contemporary American cars (especially the front-end treatment in the Marina's case) and offered them at a scale acceptable to the European market. As with its mechanics, the Marina was not intended to be visually innovative or particularly interesting – its Austin Allegro stablemate was the entry in that area of the market. A point of criticism with the Marina was that the windscreen-wiper set-up was "opposite" the driver. This was decided pre-production after drivers of the prototypes reported that airflow at certain speeds made the wiper closest to the A-post lift off the windscreen, potentially disrupting the driver's line of sight. The problem was judged sufficiently serious that the car went on sale with a wiper position as if for driving on the other side of the road, though subsequent road testers questioned the effectiveness of this decision and the basis for it.

BL was beset with problems including industrial action throughout the period, and the Marina was one of a number of models that suffered. While the labour disputes at BL eroded employment, manufacturers in Europe and Japan introduced innovative designs (such as the VW Golf) with which the Marina and its ilk were never likely to compete. Problems were compounded as the cars to replace the Marina and BL's other mid-size offerings were repeatedly delayed (eventually appearing as the Austin Maestro and Austin Montego in 1983 and 1984 respectively). By this time Leyland had abandoned the idea of separate Austin and Morris ranges. There was not enough money to develop a full range of rear-wheel-drive Morris cars and an equivalent front-wheel-drive (FWD) Austin range, and FWD was increasingly accepted across the market.

There were changes, however, albeit small ones. A facelift in 1975 gave the Marina new radiator grilles, dashboard, seats, suspension modifications and increased soundproofing. In May 1977, Marinas started to appear at dealers equipped with Allegro style seats: apart from rationalising the procuring and production processes, this was said to make the Marina seating more comfortable and supportive. The overhead camshaft O-Series engine (also used for Leyland Princess) appeared in 1.7-litre form in 1978 to replace the larger B-Series 1.8-litre models. A changed grille, including driving lights, a front spoiler and redesigned bumpers and rear lights, were added to all models.

Under severe financial strain, BL was bailed out by the government under the Ryder Report of 1975, and Sir Michael Edwardes was brought in to oversee the company. Under his leadership, BL made an attempt to update the Marina, by enlisting the help of Giorgetto Giugiaro's Italdesign. ItalDesign, however, did not design the car, which was an in-house product — it merely made changes to its appearance. The result of this exercise, the 1980 Morris Ital features large rear-lamp clusters and a new front end, but the 1971 vintage of the design was obvious. The Ital lasted four years and was replaced by the Austin Montego in early 1984.

== Popularity ==
The Marina's public life did not get off to a good start. The rushed final stages of design and production, especially in regard to the suspension, meant that many of the press fleet cars had an incorrect front-suspension set-up, whereby there was no camber change when the car rolled, which in turn produced "almost heroic" levels of understeer: Autocar reported that the car they were driving ended up on the wrong side of the road when taking a sharp corner. This was a particular problem with the more powerful 1.8 and 1.8 TC cars, which were unfortunately the models the press were most likely to test, though the 1.3-litre models, having a lighter engine, did not suffer from the problem to the same extent. Early production Marinas were fitted with the original front suspension, although a different lower link-arm (trunnion) was fitted quite quickly. The best estimate is that about 30,000 cars with the original suspension were sold to the public: many, though not all, had their front suspension set-up retrospectively corrected by dealers and before September 1971, less than six months after launch, front-suspension "uprights" were being modified on the production line. The Marina was never intended, or designed, to have particularly exciting or sharp handling, but the early problems led to less-than-flattering road-test reports and it was undeniable that the Marina's handling always tended towards understeer, which for a rear-wheel-drive car was unusual, and towards body-roll. What Car? magazine, in a typical review, described the understeer as "noticeable", but called the car as a whole "unobtrusively well designed".

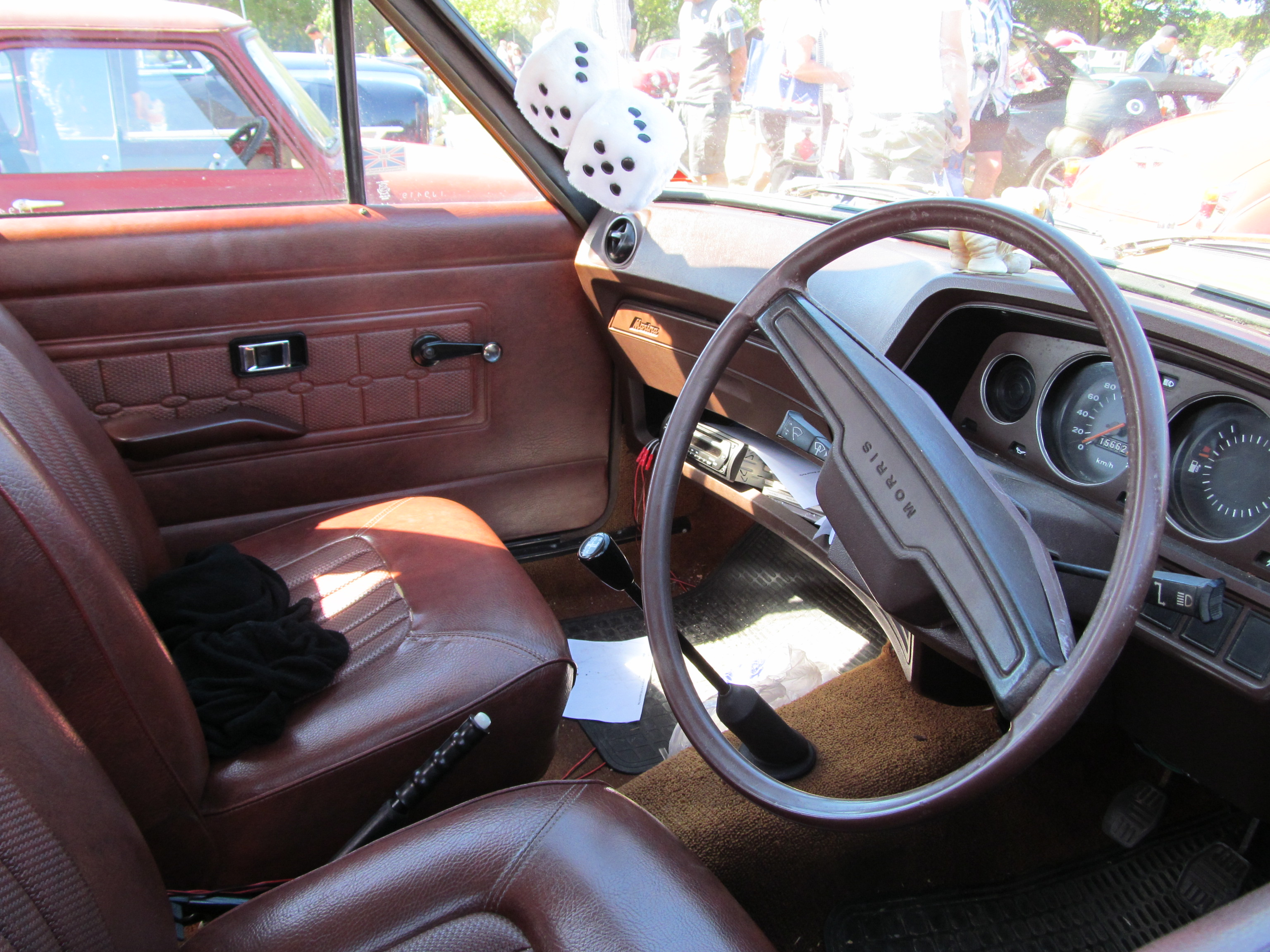
The interior of the Marina

More comprehensive suspension changes were made with the Mark 2's introduction in 1975, which added anti-roll bars that calmed the earlier car's wayward tendencies. In 1982 the Ital changed its Marina-derived front lever-arm shock absorbers for telescopic ones.

Despite heavy criticism from the media and motoring press, the car's lack of technical sophistication let it be keenly priced. The Morris Marina was a very popular car in Britain, and was among the country's best sellers throughout its production life, peaking at second place in 1973 — only surpassed by the Ford Cortina. In many ways, the car fulfilled its design goal of being an unpretentious, high volume, mass-market car for average-income families and business people.

The deliberately simple and apparently old-fashioned design of the Marina was intended mainly to appeal to company-car and corporate-fleet buyers. This market was dominated by Ford with the Escort and Cortina. BL's Austin products, with their advanced front-wheel drive and suspension systems were more expensive to buy and more costly to maintain, and so suffered poorer sales in these crucial markets. The Marina's front-engined, rear-wheel-drive, live-rear-axle layout was identical to the Ford products and most other mass-production saloons of the day. Although Ford remained dominant by a large margin, the Marina did succeed in capturing a larger share of the fleet/hire market and this contributed to its high sales. However, its image remained as a rather dull, workaday vehicle.

Marina production lasted almost ten years and in that time no fewer than 807,000 were sold across Britain, though it was less popular on export markets. By the time production of the facelifted Ital version ceased production in 1984, total Marina/Ital production had topped 1.2 million, making it BL's second biggest seller after the Mini. In fact, of all the post Ryder Report models that BL and its successors produced, only the Austin Metro would surpass the Marina's sales. Whilst intended as a stop-gap design until a more up-to-date replacement could be developed, the problems faced by British Leyland in the mid-to-late 1970s meant that the Marina remained in production essentially unchanged, other than some light facelifts and interior changes. Coupled with the continuing quality problems suffered by the car and the increasingly poor perception of BL cars as a whole, this sealed the Marina's reputation, despite its high sales.

Over the years, it has frequently been described by journalists, authors and motoring critics as one of the worst cars of all time. The relaunching of the then decade-old design as the Morris Ital only added to the image of an outdated, outclassed, and poor-performing vehicle.

=== Legacy ===
A survey conducted by Auto Express magazine in August 2006 reported that 745 of the 807,000 Marinas sold in Britain were still on the road, fewer than one of every thousand sold, making it the most-scrapped car sold in Britain over the previous 30 years. The low survival rate is due to a combination of factors, chief amongst which is the Marina's poor rust-proofing. Like other family saloon cars of the period, the Marina did not gain the status of a classic car while large numbers were still in good enough condition to encourage preservation. The Marina also made a good donor car for several other British Leyland models. The brakes and suspension from a Marina were/are often used to upgrade the Morris Minor, whilst the A and B-Series engines were used in a wide variety of other cars. The 1275 cc A Series, for example, made an easy performance improvement for a Midget or Sprite, whilst the twin-carb B-Series engine used in the TC versions of the Marina fitted the MGB without any modifications needed, and the TC engine carried a slightly higher power output. Factors such as these meant that elderly Marinas were more likely to be stripped for parts to upgrade more popular models than to be repaired or restored.

Ironically, the greatest contribution the Marina made to the automotive world was in South Korea. When George Turnbull was hired by the Hyundai conglomerate in 1974 to head up their effort to create an indigenous Korean automobile, he brought with him from the UK two Morris Marinas, a coupe and a saloon and hired a number of British engineers who had worked on the Marina project or for British Leyland. Their first product, a reworked Marina equipped with Mitsubishi engines and transmissions, and a four-door hatch back body restyled from the two door coupe by Italdesign Giugiaro, was the Hyundai Pony, whose global success turned Hyundai into a major automotive manufacturer.

In February 2016, it was reported that the number of Marinas still in use on UK roads was 295, although this figure does not count examples which are SORN.

As of December 2019, there are currently 374 Marinas on the road in the UK, with a further 498 currently SORN.

== Engines ==
- 1971–1980 - 1275 cc A-Series inline-four, 60 hp (45 kW) at 5250 rpm and 69 ft·lbf (94 Nm) at 2500 rpm
- 1971–1978 - 1798 cc B-Series inline-four
- 1971–1978 - 1798 cc B-Series twin carburettor inline-four
- 1977–1980 - 1489 cc B-Series diesel inline-four
- 1978–1980 - 1695 cc O-Series inline-four

== Running gear ==
The Marina was a conventional design, a fully unitary spot-welded body (no sub-frames were used except on the six-cylinder) with a longitudinally mounted engine driving through the transmission and naked propeller shaft to a solid live rear axle suspended on semi-elliptic leaf springs with telescopic dampers. To ease production and reduce costs, the body featured a strong central spine around the transmission tunnel, where most of the unit's strength was. The rear dampers were inclined inboard from the axle to their top mounts on this spine, rather than being mounted vertically on dedicated top mounts built into the body at the rear-wheel arches. This limited the effectiveness of the dampers somewhat (they were dissipating vertical motion when mounted at an angle), and when combined with the live rear axle, made the rear end prone to "bump steer" on rough roads. A similar setup was used on the early Ford Escort for the same reasons of cost-effective construction, but Ford revised the arrangement on later models. BL lacked the funds to retool the Marina's design significantly, and so all models were fitted in this less-than-ideal way.

The front suspension was closely derived from that on the Morris Minor, using longitudinal torsion bars for springing. The rest of the front suspension consisted of lower arms pivoting on trunnions with upper ball joints supporting the wheel and acting on hydraulic lever arm dampers. These provided superior ride comfort over rough roads when compared to early telescopic dampers, but at the expense of sloppy handling and body control at high speeds. Improvements in road surfaces, the development of the motorway network, the huge increase in the performance of even standard family cars and advances in the design of telescopic dampers since the Minor was launched in 1948 made this type of damper obsolete by 1971. Nonetheless, it was adopted to keep development and tooling costs to a minimum.

British Leyland's Special Tuning department (which primarily handled development of BL's works' motor-sport cars and technical support to private entries using BL products) produced a variety of upgrades for the Marina, which were (technically) available on road cars through special order. Amongst the S/T products were a kit to adapt the front suspension to use telescopic dampers (eventually fitted to the Ital), and adaptor kits to convert the rear dampers to a more effective vertical orientation using separate turrets. The S/T suspension upgrades produced significant improvements in handling and ride over the standard Marina, but were not widely publicised on the general market.

The troublesome manual gearbox was a four-speed unit with synchromesh on all gears except reverse, and was derived from the Triumph Toledo unit, controlled by a floor-mounted lever. Automatic transmission was a conventional Borg Warner Type 35 three-speed transmission and was offered at extra cost.

== Markets ==
=== North America ===
The Marina was available in the United States as the Austin Marina from 1973 to 1975 in two and four-door forms. It was marketed as an Austin, because Morris was a virtually unknown brand in the US, and to capitalise on the success of the Austin-Healey marque. The 1973 model still had the normal small bumpers, but the 1974/5 models had large bumpers to comply with new US regulations. It was only produced with the 1.8-litre engine, and was soon strangled by the emissions equipment that U.S. law required — an air pump and exhaust air injection. The US government soon accused BL of dumping cars in the US, which, combined with tales of poor quality, made it a poor seller, and they were not exported to the US after 1975.

The Marina was also marketed in Canada as the Austin Marina, in two-door coupé (coupe) and four-door saloon (sedan) forms, from 1972 to 1978, using only the 1.8-litre engine, fitted with US-style heavier bumpers and emissions equipment. Sales ceased when the 1.8 was replaced by a 1.7-litre engine, which was not emissions-certified in Canada. While its simple rear-wheel-drive layout and mechanicals appealed to many Canadian drivers, the Marina's body was prone to extremely fast rust-out on the salted winter roads of eastern Canada, which limited sales in later years.

=== Denmark ===
In Denmark, the Morris 1100 and 1300 models had been marketed under the Morris Marina name from 1962 to 1972.

=== Australia ===
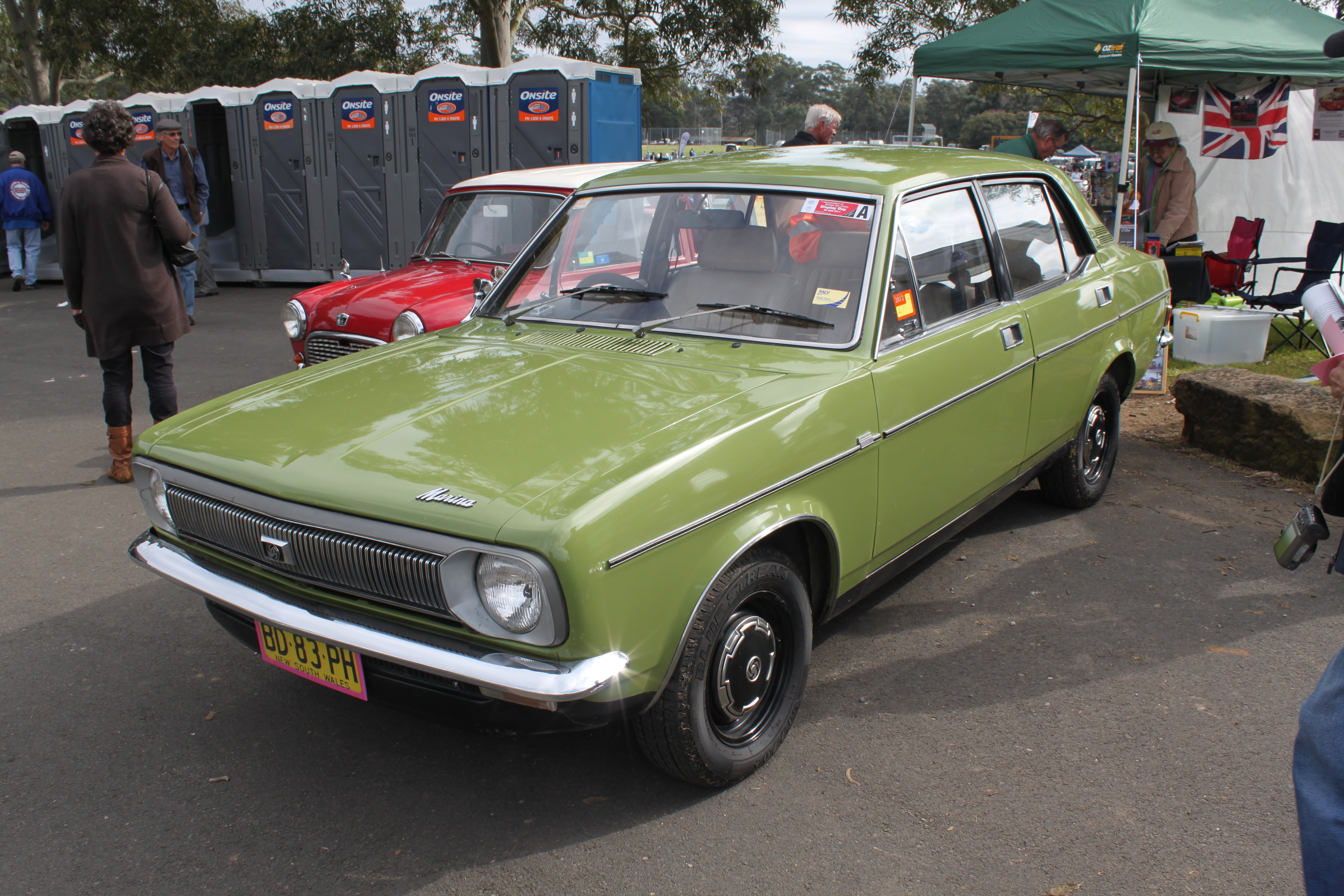
Leyland Marina Super 4 Door

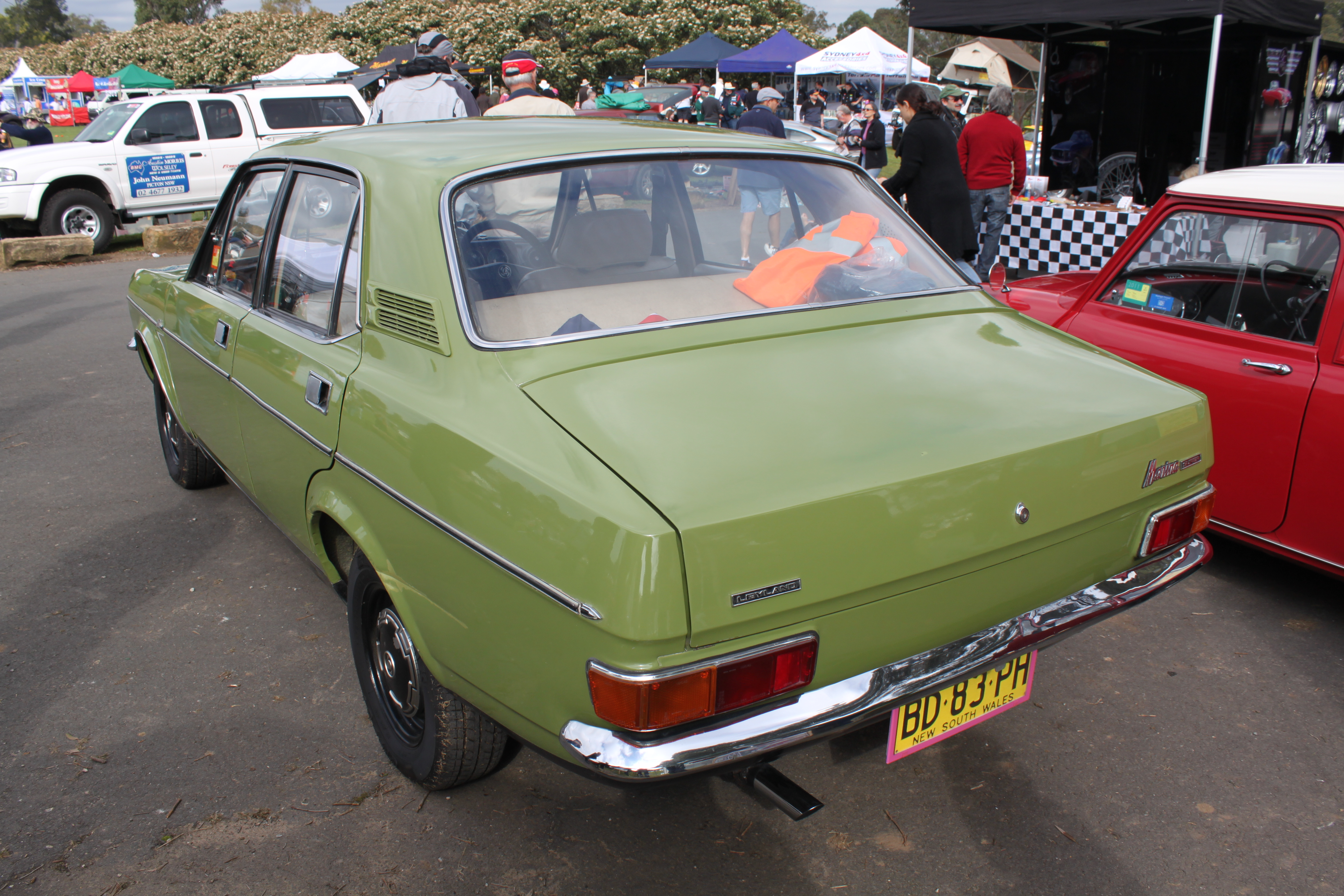
Leyland Marina Super 4 Door

The Marina was introduced to the Australian market in April 1972 as the Morris Marina and then, following a change in marketing policy, sold there from 1973 under the Leyland Marina name. From that time a restyled grille was used on all models. The Australian Marina, which was sold in sedan and coupé forms only, used the OHC E-Series four-cylinder motor in 1500 cc, 1750 cc and 1750 cc twin carburettor form. Additionally, in an attempt to compete with the Holden Torana and Ford Cortina 6-cylinder models, the Marina was also offered from November 1973 with a 121 hp (90 kW) 2600 cc E-series six-cylinder engine. This indigenous Marina variant was capable of 0–60 mph in under nine seconds.

The Australian Marinas were built from CKD kits sent from Cowley in England, but used high levels of local content, including different running gear, axle, interiors, seals, seats, uprated dampers and mounts, uprated wheels and a higher grade of fit and finish. The Marina Six used a separate front sub-frame to support the weight of the Big Red engine and different front torsion bars as well as a pair of rear radius arms in an attempt to improve handling. Base model featured a three-speed manual gearbox – sourced locally from Borg-Warner – to meet local content requirements. The Borg-Warner automatic was, however, the variation most popular in the local market.

Surprisingly, the three-speed manual gearbox, was mechanically a four-speed box with first gear blanked off. This was done due to the perceived high torque of the engine, so that first gear was deemed unnecessary.

Leyland Australia were known for their own development and a version of the Rover V8 was converted into a V6 and test fitted to a Marina saloon. Production of the Marina in Australia ended in 1975, when Leyland Australia's Victoria Park, Zetland factory (home of the Leyland P76) closed. A replacement model, the P82, was under development in 1974, but did not reach production. Over 30,000 Marinas were produced in Australia.

=== New Zealand ===
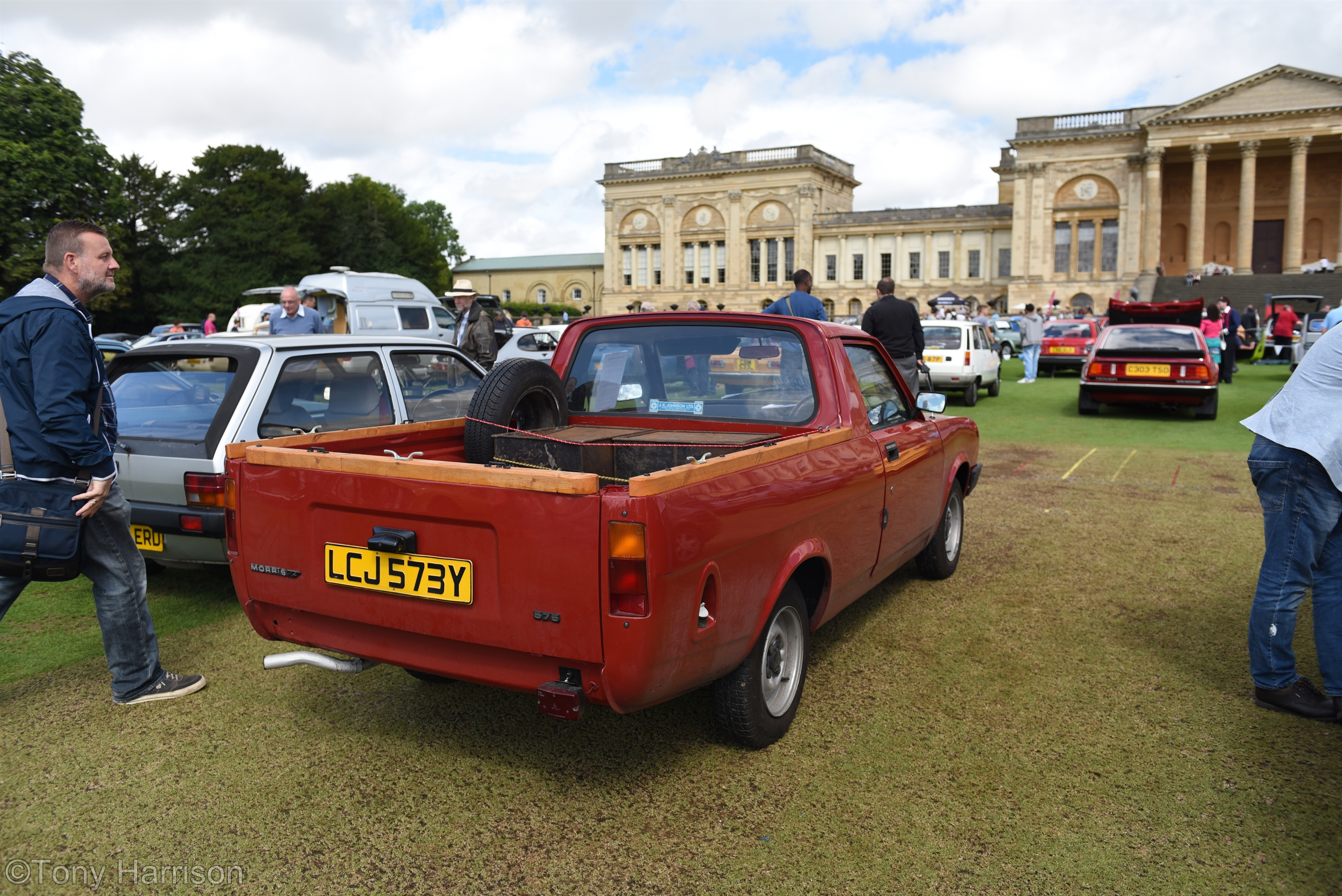
Morris 575

The Morris Marina was a popular car on the New Zealand market, imported by the New Zealand Motor Corporation. Imports began with built-up British-sourced saloons and coupes (in 1.3- and 1.8-litre forms) in 1971. Local assembly of Australian-sourced (E-Series engines) models began in 1972 after the release of the Marinas there. Six-cylinder models were added in 1973. In 1974, before the termination of Leyland Australia's manufacturing operations, local assembly switched to British-sourced models again in saloon, estate, van and pick-up forms. Batches of fully built UK-sourced cars also came in 1973 and 1974 when the government allowed additional import licences due to the inability of local assembly plants to keep pace with demand for new cars.

In 1979 the Marina received a face lift and the BL O-Series OHC 1.7-litre engine. However, at the time the Marina name was held in low regard by the New Zealand public, and was dropped, the car being renamed Morris 1700. The Morris 1700 had high equipment levels and included front spoilers and driving lights on all models. The related van and pick-up models were renamed Morris 575.

Production of the car ceased in 1981. It was replaced locally by an expanded range of NZMC Honda products.

=== South Africa ===
As in Australia, the car received the E-series engine, but was marketed as the Austin Marina. The 1.75-litre four and the 2.6-litre six were offered. Power outputs are 55 and 82 kW (75 and 111 PS; 74 and 110 hp). The 2600 was also available with a three-speed Borg Warner Type 35 automatic gearbox. After a June 1976 face lift, including a new grille with integrated spotlights and a redone interior, the 1750 became available with the automatic while the manual 2600 was dropped. This face-lift version was called the Marina Series III. The new padded dashboard was of a unified swept design with an integrated binnacle for the instruments, and had been used in British Marinas since the 1975 face lift.

The 1.3 motor was offered from 1976 until 1978, but the build quality combined with the grossly underpowered 1.3 version (particularly for the South African Highveld where heat and altitude cut engine performance by up to 20 percent) made it an absolute failure. The remnants of the production run were sold off at up to 50 percent discount on their list price.

== Rallying ==
In 1970 Donald Stokes ordered the BMC Competitions Department closed and disbanded. By the time the Marina appeared, it was becoming obvious that Stage Rallying was gaining popularity, and in early 1971 it was decided to use the new model in the November 1971 RAC rally. Luckily for BL, Special Tuning had a rally driver on its books by the name of Brian Culcheth and so with no team, no mechanics, no funding and initially no sponsorship a team of talented engineers developed a 1.3 coupé into a rally car, funded purely by sales of performance parts from Special Tuning.

Knowing that the 1.8-litre engine was too heavy for decent handling, they concentrated on the 1.3-litre engine and using Mini components got good horsepower figures from it; then they played a flanker to pen the field in the 1.3 classes. All rally teams used one particular course to test, so the car was fitted with a full-race 1.8 and blasted around the track in front of the Ford rally team – consequently they withdrew from the 1.3 class allowing the car to claim 1st in Class for the 1971 Rally.

Subsequently, the car was entered in 17 more national and international rallies up to 1975, either being placed or winning class honours in twelve of them, the others being crashes/failures. In South Africa, the local Leyland subsidiary also rallied the Marina for several years. These were serious machines, fitted originally with the Rover V8 and later with a 200-horsepower Triumph Dolomite Sprint engine. Leykor chose the heavier and less powerful Dolomite engine since more performance parts, including a close-ratio five-speed transmission, were available. With the appearance of the SD1 this situation changed again, but the Dolomite engine was used into 1977 at least.

For 1976 BL management decided to move to the Triumph Dolomite Sprint for its main rallying vehicle.

In 1974 Foden commissioned a Rover V8-engined Marina to compete in the UDT London–Sahara–Sydney Marathon rally. Driven by Major John Hemsley and Major John Skinner, the car stormed through several stages before suffering rear-axle failure in the desert. John Hemsley started the rally with his left arm in a cast having broken his wrist, leaving John Skinner to change gear for him during the special stages. The rear axle had been the only part obtained from a non-BL source.

== Post-demise ==
In 1974, George Turnbull retired from BL and took two Marinas, one saloon and one coupé, to the automotive division of the Korea conglomerate Hyundai, which was interested in developing its own car, instead of assembling Ford and Mitsubishi automobiles under licence. Hyundai took the Marinas and developed the Hyundai Pony from them, in three, four and five-door variants, a station wagon, and a pick-up, kick-starting the company's ascendancy in car manufacturing.

The Marina lived on in many smaller ways: many parts from the Marina were used in other British Leyland vehicles. The door handles from the Marina were utilized in the Austin Allegro, Range Rover, Triumph TR7, and the first series of Land Rover Discovery, until 1998. They were also used by some models of the Reliant Scimitar, and by various Lotus cars, including some versions of the Lotus Esprit. The indicator switchgear, also used on the Triumph Stag, eventually became part of the Lamborghini Diablo. Marina-sourced gearboxes were used in the MG Midget 1500 version.

== Top Gear ==
British television show Top Gear often displayed a running gag of destroying a Marina through various episodes. Notably, destruction of a Marina frequently involved the show's hosts (Jeremy Clarkson, Richard Hammond, and James May) dropping a piano onto the roof; Hammond once tried to avoid that by driving a Marina with a piano already on top of it, only for a second one to land on it as he was away from the car running to get a tool kit for a mechanical issue. The show received threats on the forum for the Morris Marina Owners' Club, whose members took issue with the destruction of the Marinas; the presenters responded by reading and mocking the forum posts in news segments. During a 2009 episode in which the hosts were tasked with entering an ice race in France, Clarkson claimed the Marina featured as the trio's backup car was previously owned by the wife of the president - presumably of the Marina Owners' Club, but facetiously understood by the trio as Carla Bruni, wife of then-president Nicolas Sarkozy. Clarkson was adamant through the episode to preserve the Marina due to its high-profile ownership, though the car was later destroyed in similar fashion with a piano being dropped on its roof following the race. In the Top Gear book Crap Cars by Richard Porter, the Marina was named fourth worst car of all time. However, presenter James May stated that at least one Marina should be preserved, as a warning to future generations.

== See also ==
- Austin Allegro
