= New Zealand Motor Corporation =

New Zealand motor vehicle company

- Industry: Automotive industry
- Founded: 1970
- Successor: Honda New Zealand
- Area served: New Zealand

The New Zealand Motor Corporation was the New Zealand representative, importer, distributor and retailer of a number of the best-known British automobiles. It carried out the same functions for a wide range of manufacturers of industrial machinery and equipment. It inherited and operated four independent plants assembling CKD kits of British Leyland and from the late 1970s, Honda models. It was succeeded piecemeal by Honda New Zealand in the 1980s.

== Formation ==
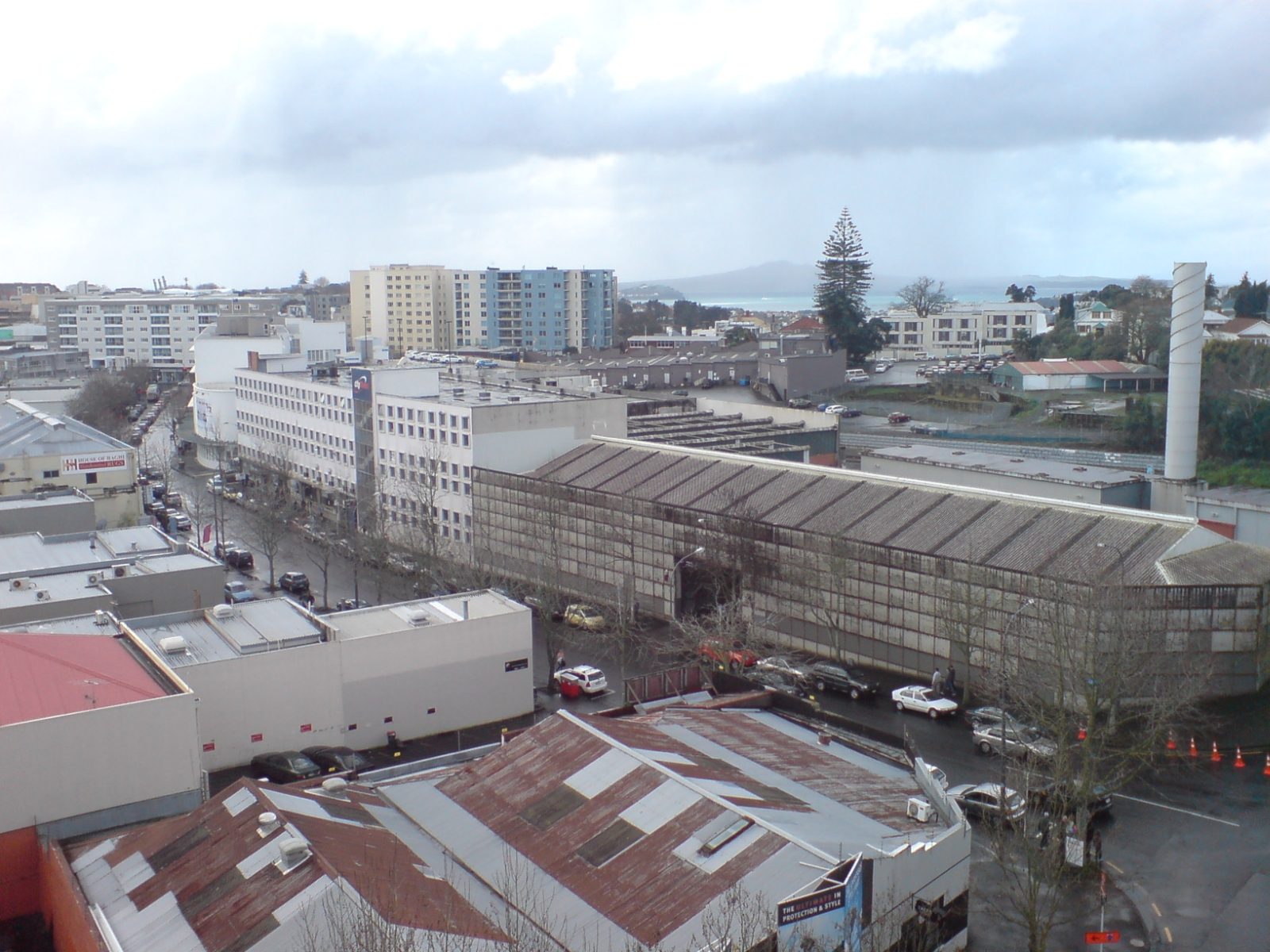
Some of the recycled buildings of the former Dominion Motors Morris assembly plant in Nuffield Street, Newmarket, Auckland in 2010

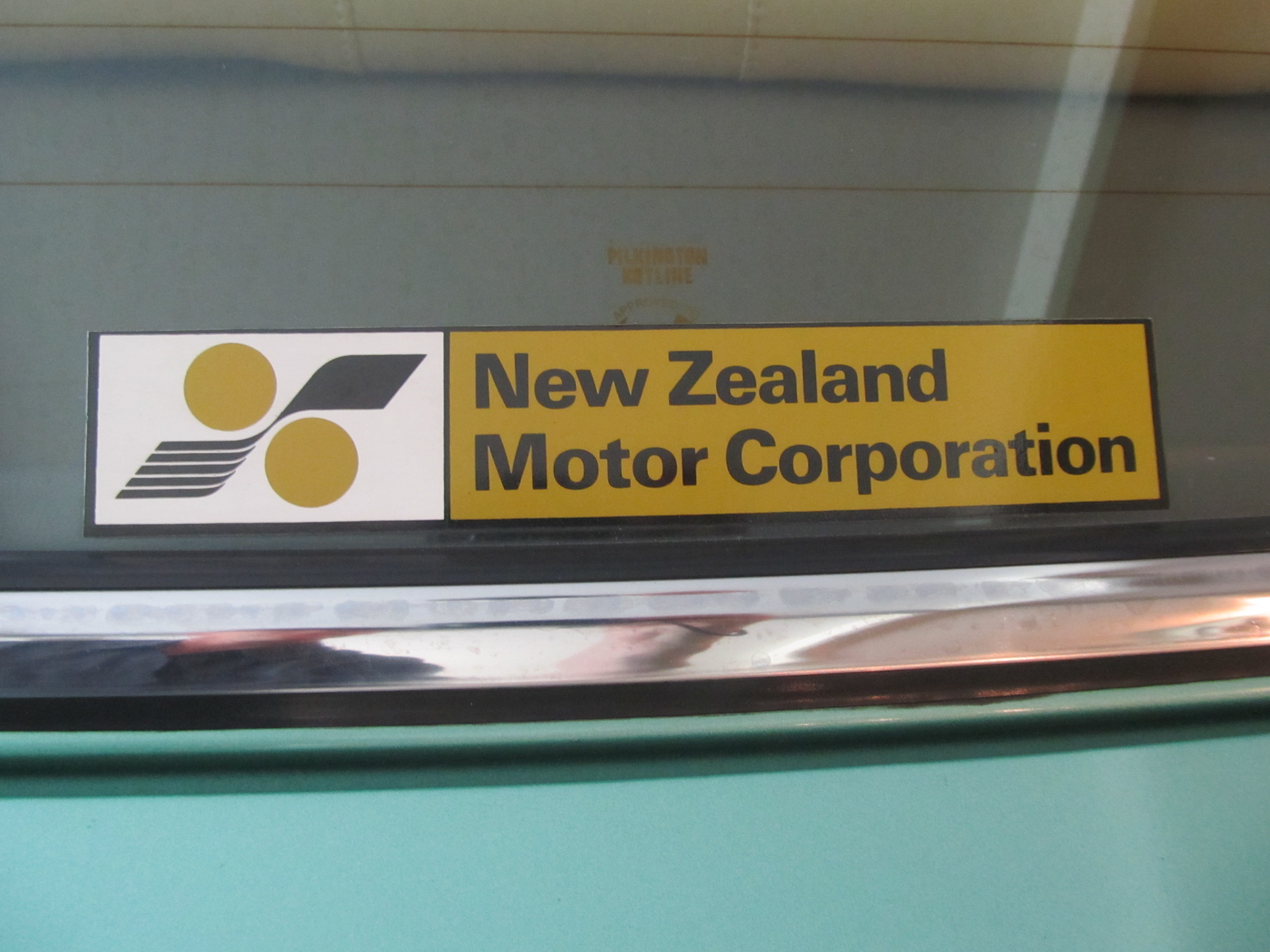
1982 Honda Accord

New Zealand Motor Corporation (NZMC) was formed and listed on the New Zealand Exchange in 1970. It was the long-delayed pooling of their ownership and resources by British Leyland's two principal New Zealand representatives, motor assemblers, distributors and retailers: Dominion Motors (Nuffield) and the Austin Distributors Federation.

Together they had 3,000 staff, 40 retail branches and four car assembly plants Newmarket (Morris), Panmure (Morris), Petone (Austin) and Nelson (Rover-Triumph). At that time British Leyland brands had a good market share in New Zealand but sales dropped reflecting British Leyland's sagging fortunes. New Zealand's principal export customer, the United Kingdom, joined the Common Market in 1973 and took up different sources for its agricultural produce. The mid-1970s witnessed a firm switch to Japanese brands. Not until the end of the 1970s did Hondas begin to replace the British Marina and Princess on NZMC's assembly lines. Economic difficulties in the early-1980s brought about a major restructuring of the New Zealand economy. A new government set about removing protection from many industries including local vehicle assembly. All NZMC assembly plants except the near-new former Rover-Triumph now Honda plant in Nelson had closed by 1988. Nelson closed in 1998.

=== Products ===
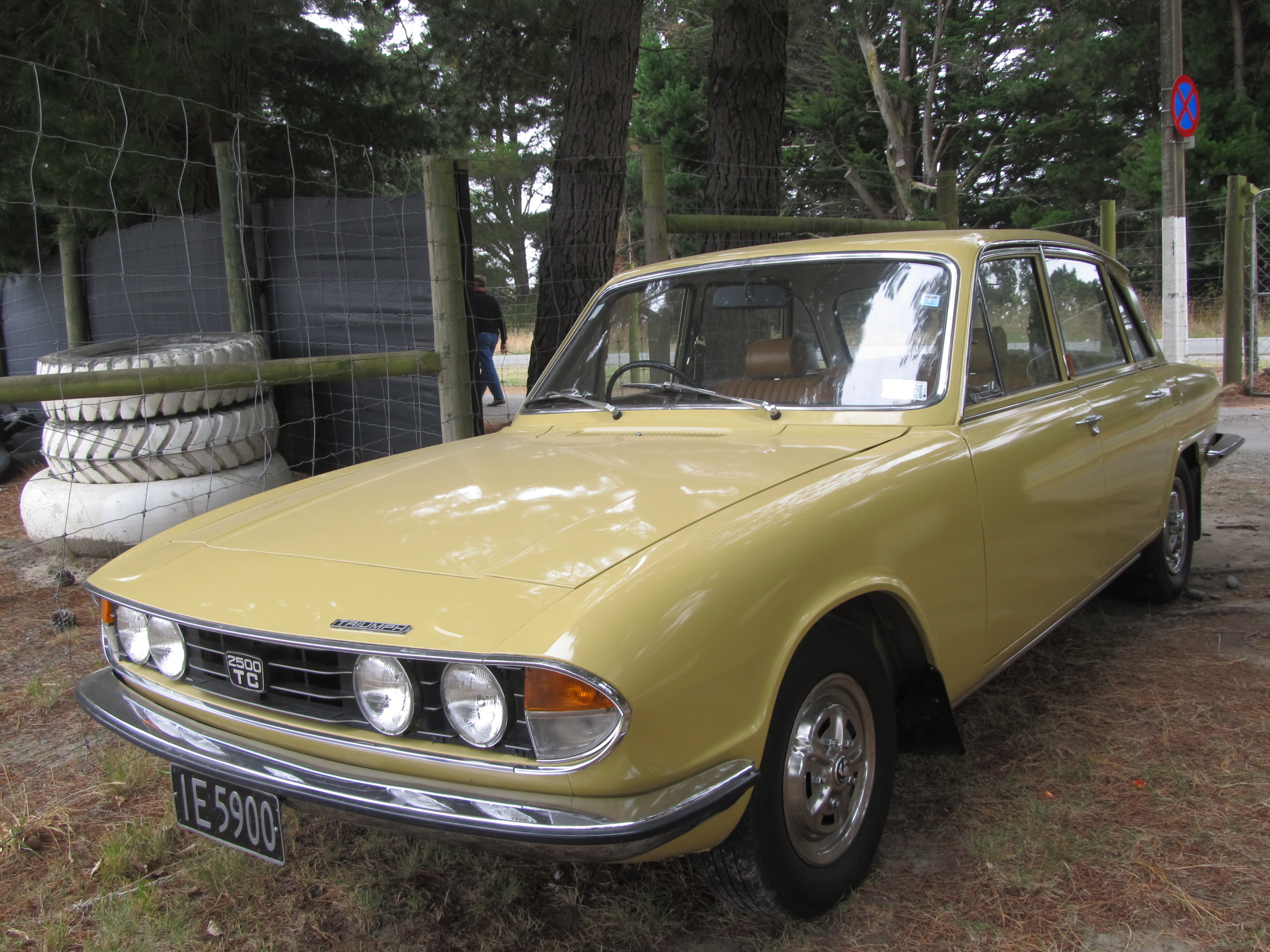
New Zealand Motor Corporation assembled 1977 Triumph 2500TC

Cars and commercial vehicles, bus chassis and bodies, tractors, industrial and earthmoving equipment, diesel engines, cranes, shipping containers. While primarily producing vehicles for the New Zealand market, some were exported to Australia.

=== Brands ===
Austin, Honda, Jaguar, Land Rover, Leyland, Morris, Rolls-Royce, Rover, Triumph
Aveling-Barford, Case, Cummins, Davis, ERF, Liebherr, Mitsubishi, WABCO, White

=== Franchised dealers ===
There were 65 franchised dealers in 1980.

== Honda ==
Honda began acquiring the Honda assets from NZMC in the mid-1980s, first acquiring a 25% stake in 1985. Honda New Zealand Ltd was formed in 1988 and assembly of Honda passenger vehicles continued at the Nelson plant until August 1998, when tariffs on imported cars were abolished.
