= Mini concept cars =

Concept cars produced with the British car marque Mini

There have been a number of Mini concept cars, produced to show future ideas and forthcoming models at international motorshows.

== Pre BMW era ==
=== 9X (1967 to 1979) ===
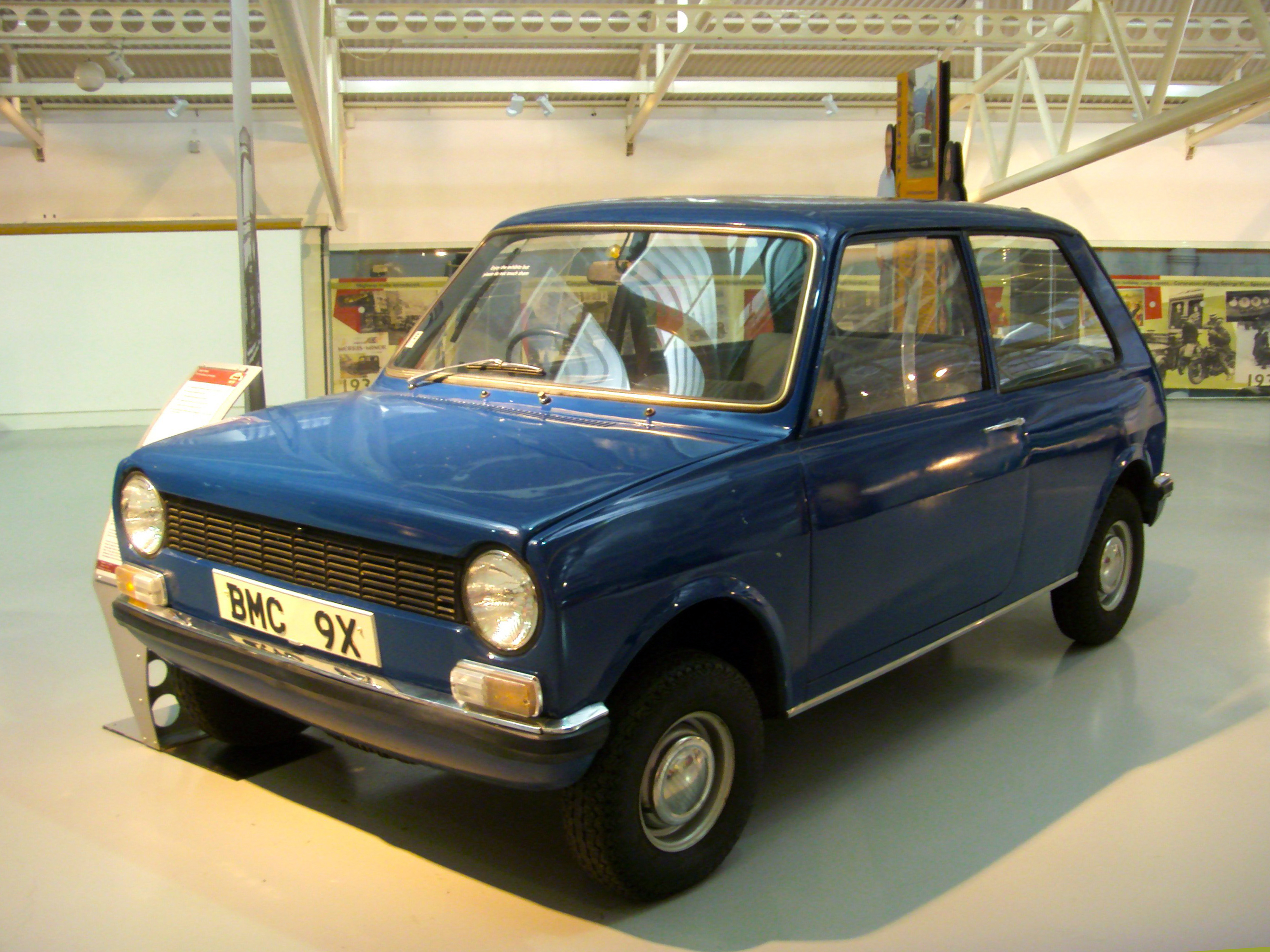
Mini 9X at the Heritage Motor Centre

From 1967 to 1979, Alec Issigonis worked on designing a replacement for the Mini in the form of an experimental model called the 9X. The 9X was developed from the remains of a previous project in 1966 when Innocenti requested a smaller Mini for the Italian market, known as Mini-Mini and later the Innocenti 750, with a new in-sump gearbox and an engine stretchable between 750-1000cc. Market research at BMC doubted there would be a market for such a car outside of Italy, where it would be unable to compete with the Fiat 500 on price; its engine and gearbox were carried over to the 9X. Due to politicking inside British Leyland (which had now been formed by the merger of BMC's parent company British Motor Holdings and the Leyland Motor Corporation), the car never reached production.

The 9X addressed a number of engineering issues in Issigonis' original design, including its complexity, its harsh ride and its mechanical refinement, which was affected by the gearbox-in-sump layout. The first fully engineered prototype had a shorter wheelbase than the Mini but was four inches shorter overall. It was also slightly wider and offered more interior space plus a hatchback body. The separate subframes of the Mini were removed and the body frame construction simplified: the 9X required less than half the number of individual parts to build than a Mini.

The power unit was a new four-cylinder design with a belt-driven overhead camshaft. The crankcase and cylinder head were made from aluminium alloy while the block was of cast iron, with all three sections held together by long through-bolts. This was similar in construction to the original Austin Seven's engine, and similar ideas were revisited in the 1980s for the Rover K-Series engine. Capacity in the prototype was 1000cc with versions as low as 750cc possible, as well as six-cylinder versions that would still be compact enough to install transversely. Power output was 60 horsepower per litre (compared with around 40 hp/litre for the existing A-Series engine), and the new engine was also lighter. To reduce maintenance and the number of parts, the engine's alternator was incorporated into the flywheel, a practice already common on motorcycles.

The gearbox was mounted behind and below the engine in a separate casing, rather than sharing the engine's sump oil. This reduced noise from the Mini's transmission transfer gears and allowed better control of drivetrain shunt and vibration.

The Hydrolastic suspension system developed by Alex Moulton was not used, in favour of a more conventional system with MacPherson struts at the front and a torsion beam axle at the back. This reduced production costs, potentially reduced warranty claim rates, and allowed a more comfortable ride.

The 9X was similar in concept to later European superminis such as the Fiat 127, the Peugeot 104, the Renault 5 and the Volkswagen Polo, but was designed several years before the first of these cars was launched. Issigonis also drew up plans for a larger five-door 9X known as 10X on a 90-inch (2286mm) or 96-inch (2438mm) wheelbase against the three-door 80-inch (2036mm) wheelbase of the second built 9X prototype. This enlarged 10X version shared many structural, suspension and drivetrain parts with the 'Mini-sized' 9X and was Issigonis' proposal to succeed his own ADO16 design. Issigonis also drew up comparisons based around an extended 9X measuring at 10ft 6-inches.

=== Project Ant - the Barrel Mini (1968) ===
Project Ant ran parallel to Issigonis' 9X and was a plan to keep the same space efficiency while being cheaper to manufacture, less complex and requiring fewer labour hours, on either an eighty or eighty-four inch wheelbase. The project was cancelled in 1968; however, it would still be part of a later design competition conducted between it and what became ADO74 (then known as Project Ladybird) between 1972 and 1974. Project Ant performed well in this comparison, particularly when fitted with Allegro rear suspension, but it was eventually decided — though not unanimously — that a supermini was needed rather than a new Mini.

=== Mini Clubman (1967-68) ===
In 1967 Roy Haynes joined BMC from Ford Motor Company and was tasked by then Managing Director, Joe Edwards to update the existing Mini. Several designs were considered, including a booted version based on the Riley / Wolseley Elf/Hornet and a hatchback with a rear end resembling a Morris Marina, also designed by Haynes. All of these were rejected except for the new front, which was added to the existing Mini and named the Clubman.

=== Pininfarina Mini ===
In 1967 and 1968, Pininfarina designed two concept cars based on the BMC 1800 and 1100 models. These aerodynamic models by Paolo Martin were rejected by BMC; there is evidence that BMC conducted a study of a mini version of this car without Pininfarina's involvement.

=== ADO74 ===
In 1972 British Leyland began considering a replacement for the then 13-year-old Mini, known initially as Project Ladybird. With the cancellation of the 9X under BMC, the small car market had been left to the growing number of superminis which, as the 9X had done, took the Mini concept and developed it further.

The main development was the realisation that the Mini's small size was not entirely necessary. Superminis were still smaller than the usual small family car but somewhat larger than the Mini, allowing more usable interior space without the seating position, drivetrain refinement and equipment compromises that the Mini used to create its spacious but small interior. The Italian engineer Dante Giacosa had long been Issigonis' main rival in small car design, and his transverse engine layout (without a gearbox-in-sump) combined with a hatchback — both ideas Issigonis had himself considered as ways of improving on the 9X — provided the template for the new generation of superminis.

British Leyland now had to catch up with the market. The ADO74 project considered various proposed car sizes, from a direct Mini replacement to a more conventional supermini and a compact saloon. The mid-sized option was chosen, and styling proposals were drawn up by Harris Mann and Giovanni Michelotti, with Mann's design going forward. The result was over 15 inches longer than the Mini, with a wheelbase 10 inches longer. Like the 9X (and most of its would-be competitors) the ADO74 used MacPherson strut front suspension, but with independent trailing arms at the rear, similar to the contemporary Honda Civic. Power was to have come from the proposed H-Series later K-Series engines, which were new designs that owed little to the A-Series engine, though it could have just as easily been built with the A-Series initially due to the company's financial state.

The ADO74 project progressed slowly, partly due to continuing corporate problems at BL and partly due to the need for numerous design changes requested by the firm's overseas sales division, Leyland International, which took the view that the ADO74 was too conventional and that it would be better to create another innovative car rather than compete directly with the established competition. The supermini market moved quickly in the early 'Seventies and the ADO74 underwent several redesigns to keep pace with these changes. Eventually these changes became significant enough that BL decided it would be better to start from scratch. The ADO74 project was cancelled in 1973 and the ADO88 project took its place.

=== ADO88 ===
This was a 'clean sheet' design using the knowledge gained from the cancelled ADO74 proposal, with Charles 'Spen' King in overall charge. The new car was sized to be smaller than the established superminis but larger than a Mini, to allow improvements in refinement, practicality and safety that the market demanded. With the Mini's interior space for its size still one of the ageing model's key selling points, the brief for ADO88 was that the car offer the same usable cabin volume as the competition but in a car with smaller external dimensions.

Budget restrictions meant that there would be no new power units for the ADO88, which would instead use the existing A-Series units from the Mini, along with the old car's gearbox-in-sump transmission. Tests showed that despite its age the engine could still deliver competitive fuel economy, so it was modernised and updated to create the A-Plus generation. The conventional suspension of the 9X and the ADO74, and the Mini's solid rubber cone springs, were replaced by the Hydragas system recently introduced on the Austin Allegro, which offered an improvement in ride quality as well as being more compact than a standard steel spring and damper setup, which was important for providing the car with the required interior space.

That requirement also led to the ADO88, despite the efforts of Harris Mann, having a boxy appearance, with an almost vertical rear hatch (similar in appearance to the later Fiat Cinquecento). This style was received poorly in customer clinics and the project was renamed LC8 with the aim of providing a more upmarket style and appearance to make the car more competitive. Having originally been intended as a complete Mini replacement, LC8 would now become a separate car in its own right to replace the higher-end Clubman and 1275GT Mini models, while the more basic Minis would continue (with some of the improvements from the ADO88 project such as the A-Plus engine and front disc brakes) as a budget model. The LC8 became the Austin Metro, which was initially launched in 1980 as the Austin Mini-Metro to signify its status as a supplement to the Mini range rather than a replacement.

== 1994 to present ==
=== Mini Spiritual and Spiritual Too (1997) ===
At the 1997 Geneva Motor Show, BMW and Rover with help from Italian coachbuilder Stola revealed two Mini concepts called the Spiritual and Spiritual Too. Compared to the ACV30, it showed a potential non-retro design for the forthcoming new Mini, which was designed by Oliver Le Grice. The Spiritual featured a rear-engined 60 hp 800 cc 3-cylinder version of the K-Series engine, while Spiritual Too used a 1.1-litre 4-cylinder K-Series as well as the latest version of Alex Moulton's Hydragas suspension system, aimed at maximising interior space.

=== Mini ACV30 (1997) ===
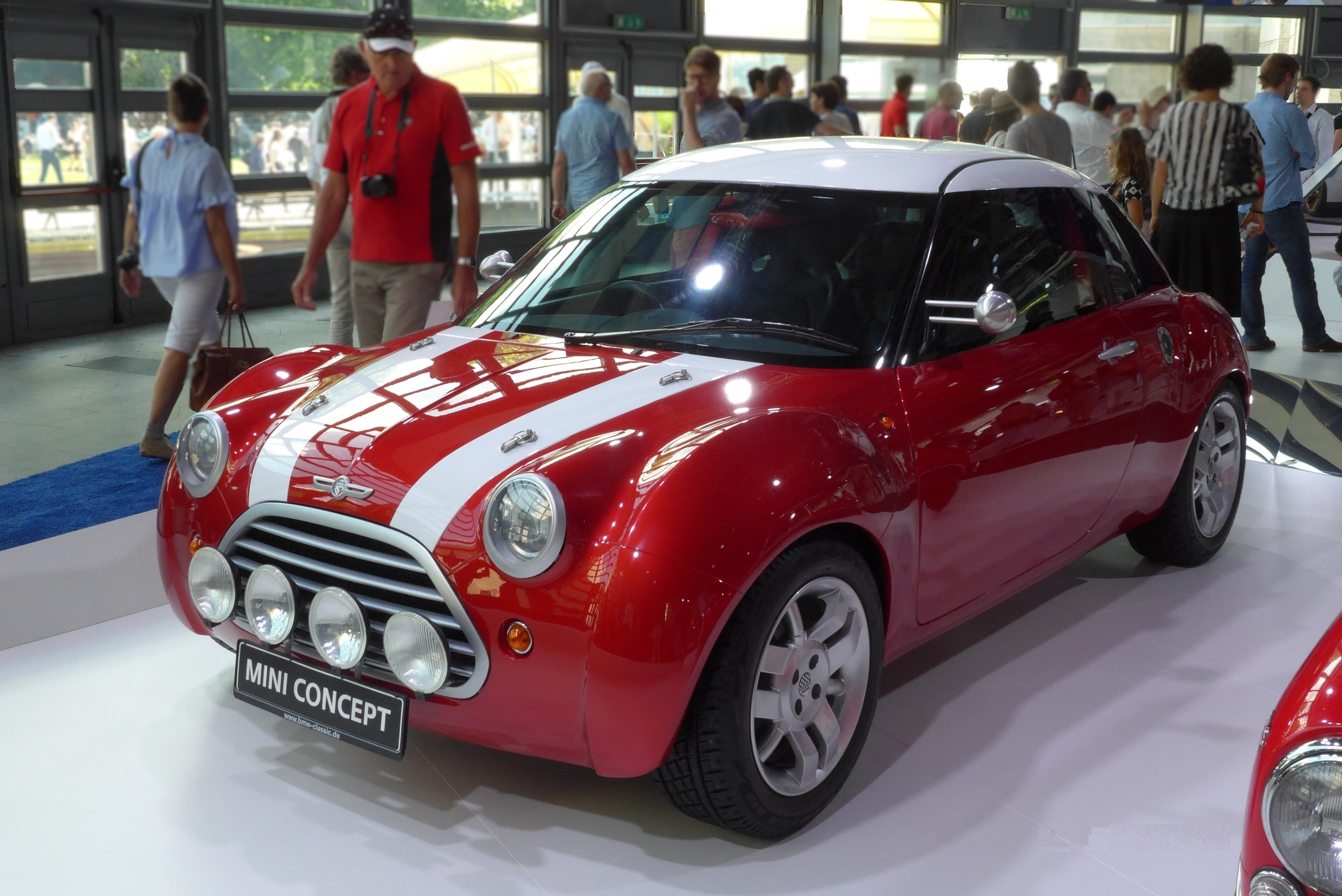
Mini ACV30 concept car

Rover first showed its ideas for a modern Mini in the form of the ACV30 concept car in 1997, created to mark the 30th anniversary of Mini's win at the 1967 Monte Carlo Rally, with ACV standing for Anniversary Concept Vehicle.

Based on the mid-engined, rear wheel drive MG F, the ACV30 featured several elements that influenced the eventual new Mini of 2001, such as the black a-pillars, wheel arch detailing and white roof. The concept was attributed to the BMW designer Adrian van Hooydonk and Frank Stephenson, but the research work began at the end of 1995, with a collaboration with the Transportation design course of the IED in TurinIED it. In particular, the project of the Sicilian designer Salvatore Catalano was acquired in July 1996 by Rover and chosen for the development of the concept, and some ideas were subsequently applied in the development of the production Mini.

=== 2000 Paris Motor Show ===
Before the first sales of the new generation Mini in 2001, prototype versions were shown at the 2000 Paris Motor Show. These were essentially identical to the version that was finally sold except that the colours used ('Candy Blue' and 'Flamenco Orange') have never been used in production.

=== Mini Hydrogen concept (2001) ===
Mini showed a hydrogen-powered concept car in 2001 at the Frankfurt Auto Show. The car differs from electric-motor hydrogen concepts, such as the Honda FCX, in that it uses a cylinder-based internal combustion engine based on the existing 1.6-litre petrol Mini.

=== Mini Traveller (2005) ===
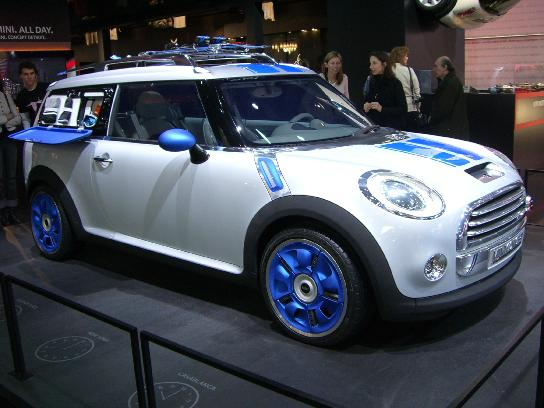
Mini Traveller concept car at the 2006 Detroit Auto Show

At the 2005 Frankfurt Motor Show Mini revealed a retro version of the classic "Mini Traveller" estate car. The Traveller concept had a stretched wheelbase, two side-hinged rear doors, and separate rear seats replacing the split bench seat of the standard Mini. At the Tokyo Auto Show, the same basic concept reappeared with additions — a circular roof section that could be removed to form a picnic table with four folding chairs. The rear side windows were replaced with fold-down storage containers containing cutlery, cups and plates. A further version was presented at Detroit without the table and chairs but with a restyled interior. A production version of the Traveller concept vehicle appeared during the 2008 model year as the Mini Clubman.

=== Mini Crossover (2008) ===
The Mini Crossover Concept was unveiled in 2008 at the Paris Motor Show. It was over 4 metres (13 ft) long, with four-wheel drive, wide tyres, and a single piece rear door with a retractable rear window. Inside, it had a glass ball in the centre of the instrument panel, called the 'Mini Centre Globe'; this system incorporated laser projection technology for 3D navigational routes and films. A production vehicle based on the Crossover Concept was launched in 2010 as the Mini Countryman.

=== Mini Coupé (2009) ===
The Mini Coupé concept vehicle was unveiled in 2009 at the Frankfurt Motor Show. It had a 2-seat coupé body, and incorporated the engine from the Mini John Cooper Works, and the chrome radiator grille from the Cooper S (but with the inner sections of the grille finished in the body colour). It had a luggage capacity of 250 litres.

BMW subsequently announced that the Mini Coupé would go into production, with assembly to take place in Oxford.

=== Mini Beachcomber (2009) ===
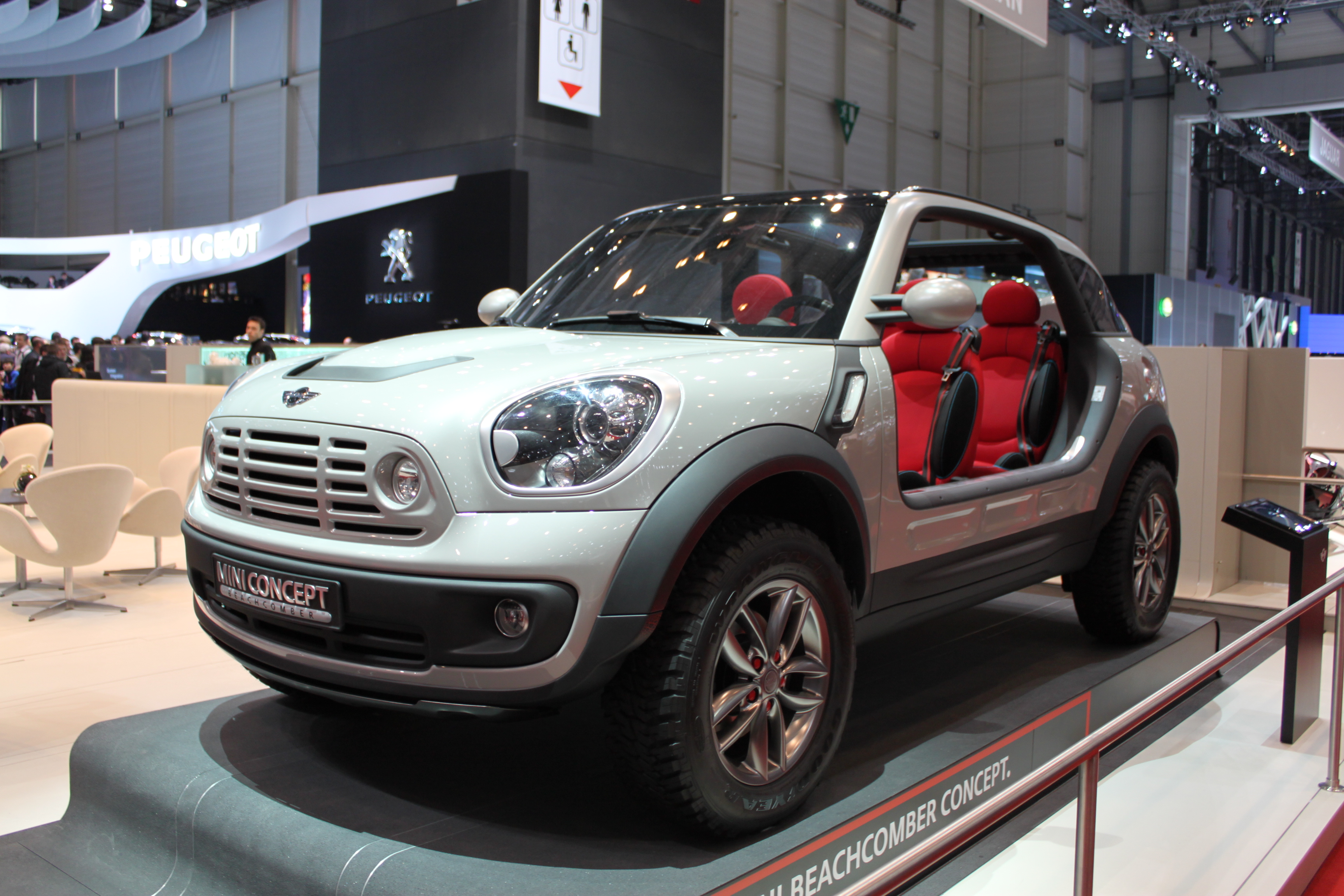
Mini Beachcomber at the 2010 Geneva Motor Show.

On 16 December 2009, Mini revealed the Beachcomber Concept, which drew on the Moke styling while incorporating modern equipment. The Beachcomber Concept was based on the forthcoming Countryman all-wheel drive platform, and made its public debut at the Detroit Auto Show in January 2010.

=== Mini Paceman (2011) ===
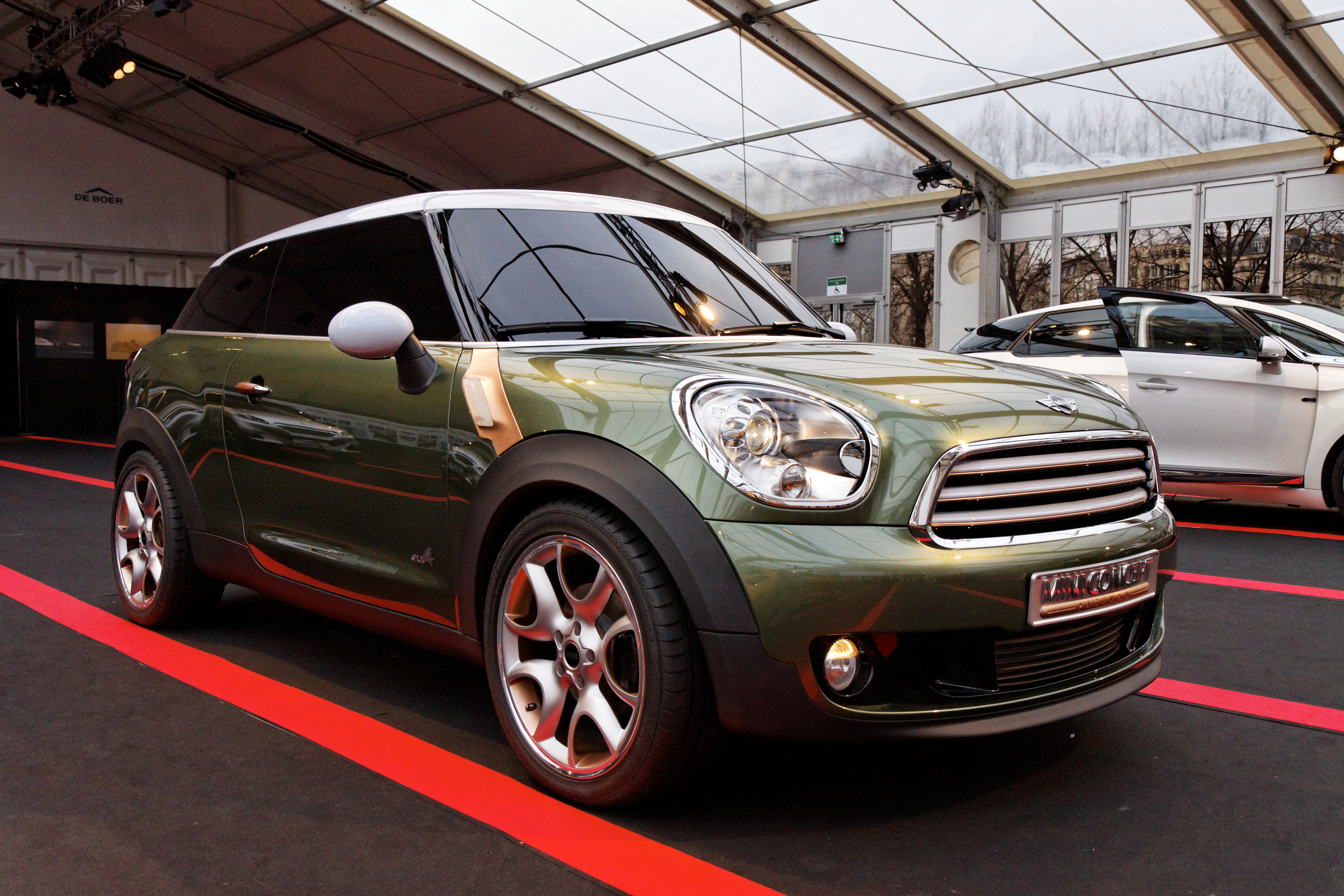
2012 Mini Paceman concept

The three-door Paceman concept was announced in January 2011 at the Detroit Auto Show, marking Mini's 10th anniversary in the US market. Designed by Gert Hildebrand, it was based on the recently launched Countryman, with a similar interior, and range of options and drivetrains, including the ALL4 permanent all-wheel drive system. From the screen rearwards, the Paceman featured a new exterior borrowing design features of the 2009 Mini Coupe Concept and is 4110mm long.

The concept car was shown with the most powerful engine in the Mini range at the time: the John Cooper Works 1.6-litre twin-scroll turbocharged engine, with 211 hp and maximum torque of 260 Nm, with an overboost maximum of 280 Nm. Production was planned to commence in 2012, and Mini's marketing materials referred to it as the first "Sports Activity Coupe".

=== Mini Rocketman (2011) ===
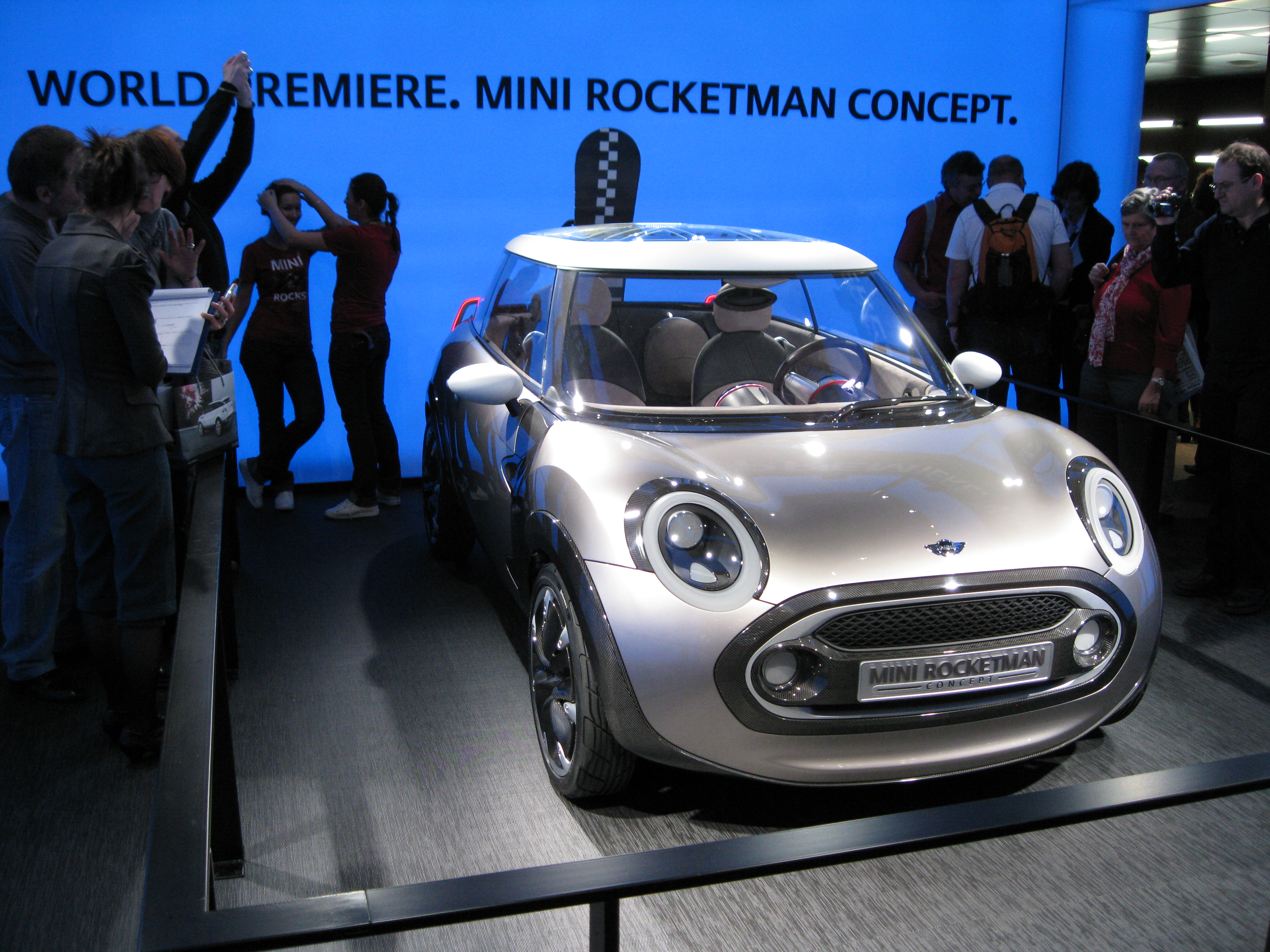
Mini Rocketman at Geneva 2011 Geneva Motor Show.

The Mini Rocketman concept was first shown to the public at the 2011 Geneva Motor Show. It is a smaller three-door hatchback, about a foot shorter than the Mini Hatch. The Rocketman features a panoramic glass roof etched with the flag of the Mini brand's country of origin. It is close in size to the original Mini, has a cantilevered door design and a carbon spaceframe construction. Mini stated a fuel consumption figure of 94 miles per imperial gallon (3.0 L/100 km; 78 mpg_{‑US}), on average.

Yahoo! described the Rocketman as 'the weirdest concept Mini yet'. It was expected that the concept car would reach production, but in early 2012 it was confirmed that the car would remain a concept only.

=== Mini Clubvan (2012) ===
The Mini Clubvan was shown for the first time at the 2012 Geneva Motor Show. Based on the existing Mini Clubman, it was the first light commercial van made by Mini in 30 years, since the demise of the original Mini Van in 1982.

=== Mini Vision (2013) ===
The Mini Vision was first shown in Germany in July 2013, and anticipated the design evolution of the forthcoming 2014 Mini.

=== Mini Clubman (2014) ===
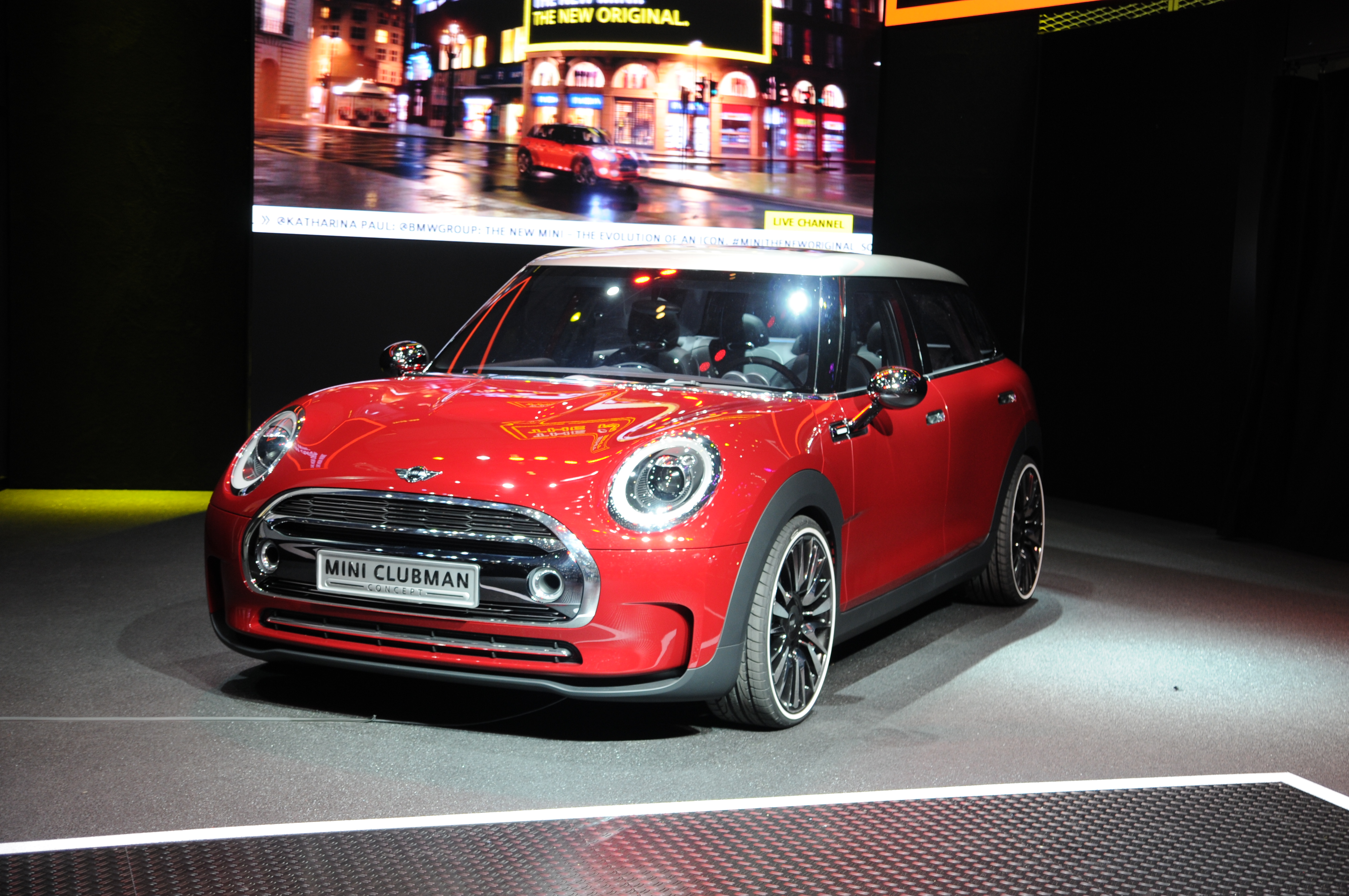
Mini Clubman concept at the 2014 Geneva Motor Show

The Mini Clubman concept is the longest and widest car designed by Mini, larger than the production Countryman. It was unveiled at the 2014 Geneva Motor Show, and is considered to anticipate the design of the future Clubman model.

=== Vision GT ===
In June 2014, it was announced that Mini would create a new concept car for the video game Gran Turismo 6.

=== Mini Superleggera Vision (2014) ===
In 2014 Mini presented the Mini Superleggera Vision Concept in collaboration with Carrozzeria Touring Superleggera at the Concorso d'Eleganza Villa d'Este.

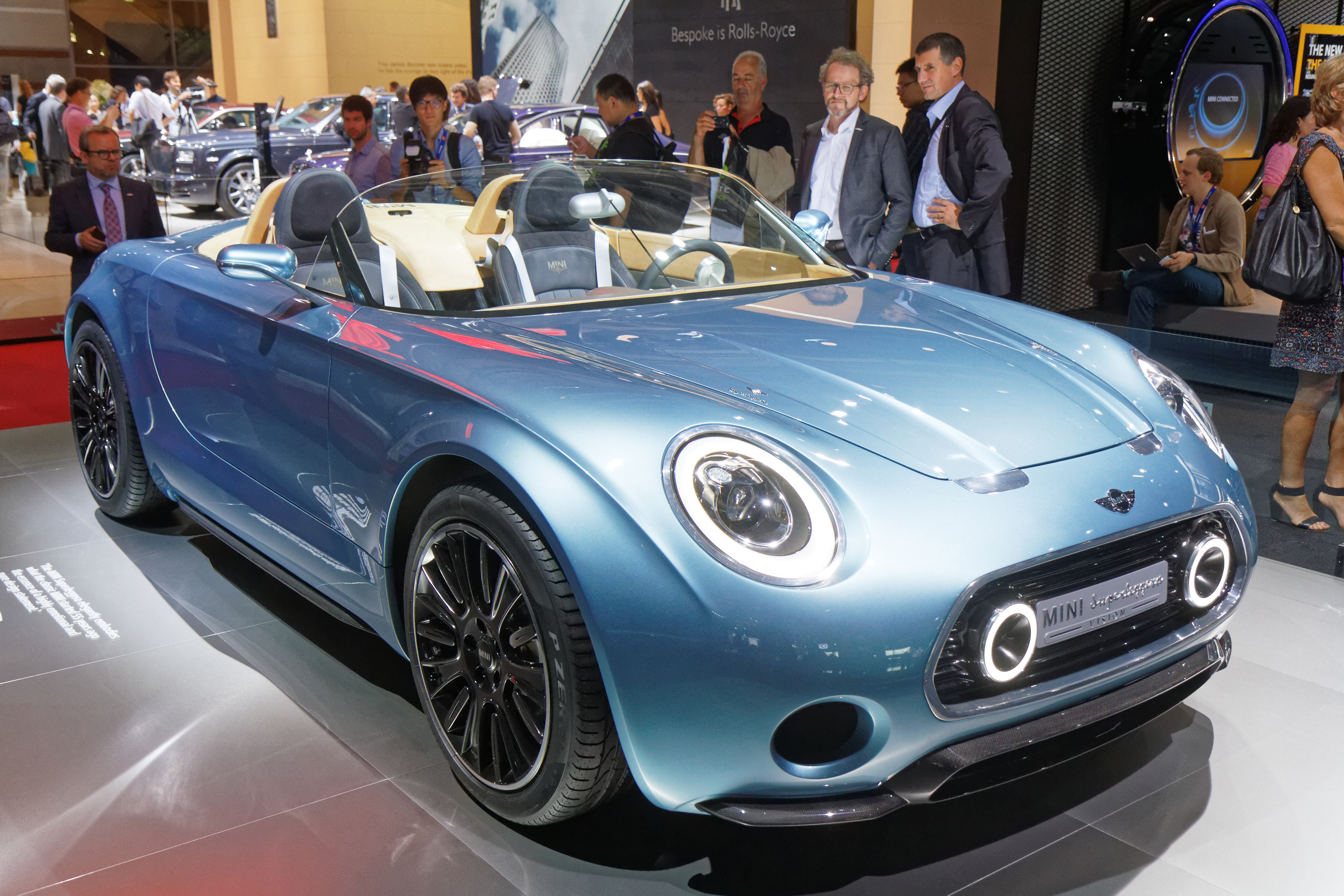
Mini Superleggera Vision Concept

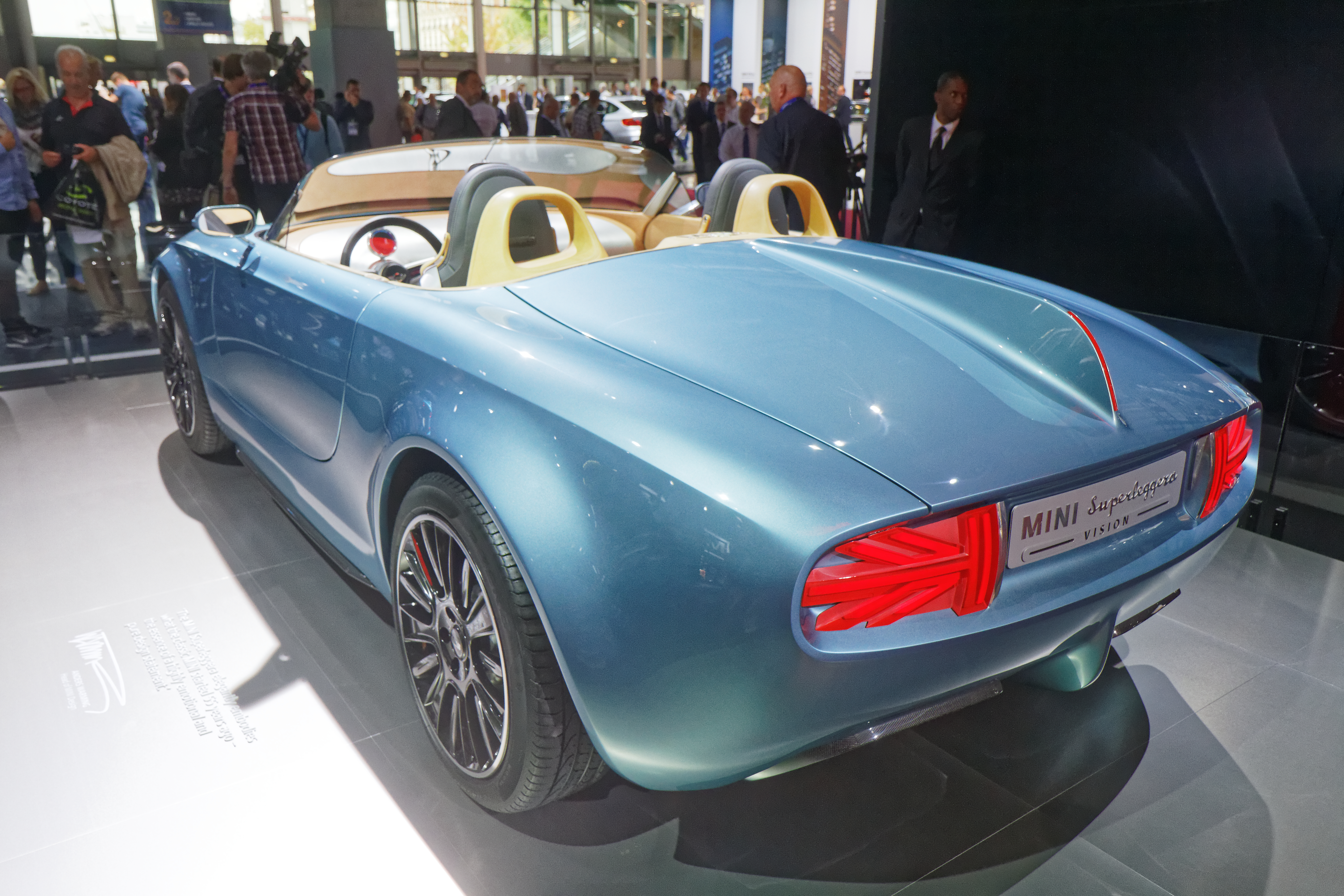

=== Electric Concept ===
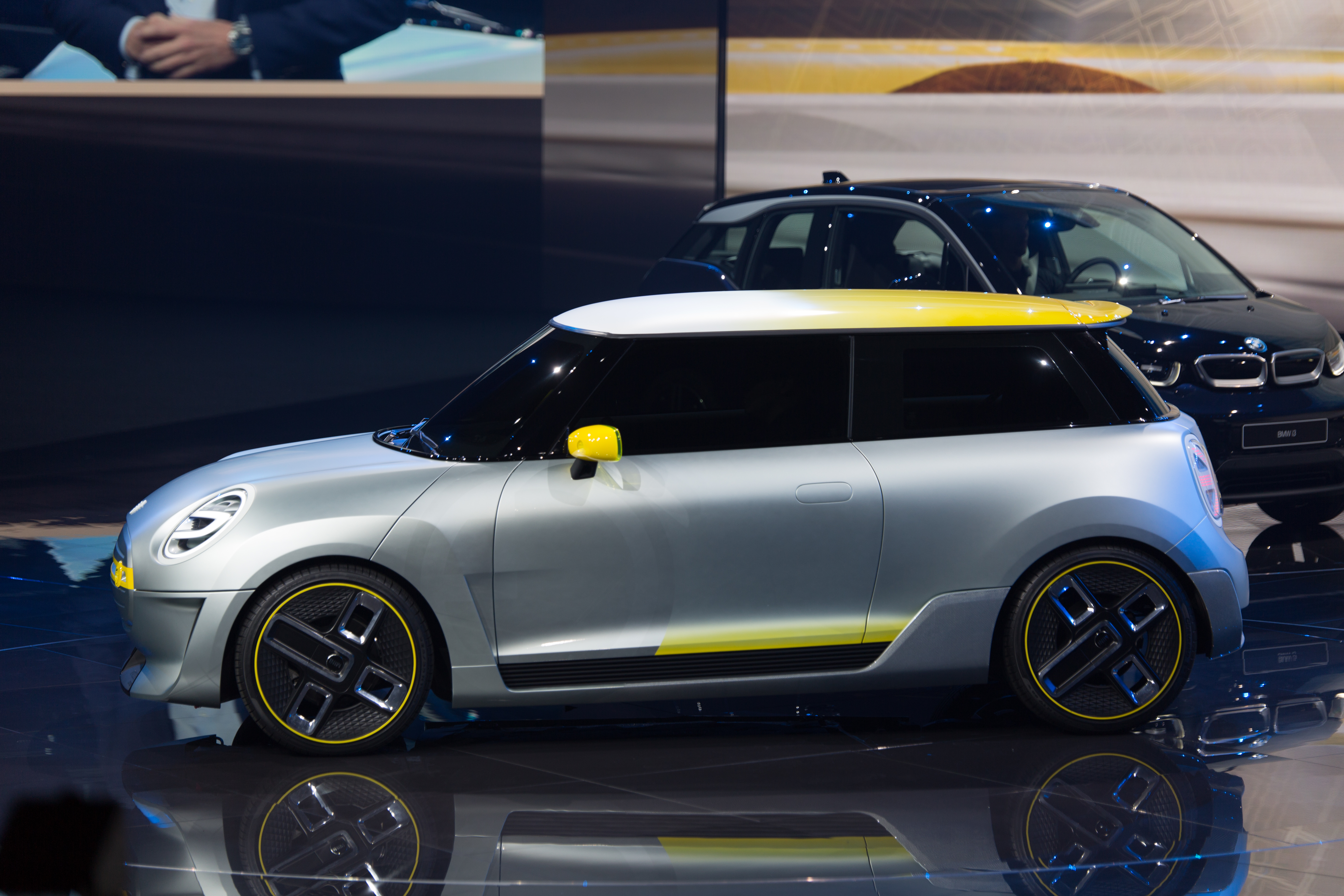
Electric Concept during presentation in Frankfurt

The Electric Concept was presented during IAA 2017 in Frankfurt, as a preview of a fully electric production model.

=== John Cooper Works GP Concept ===
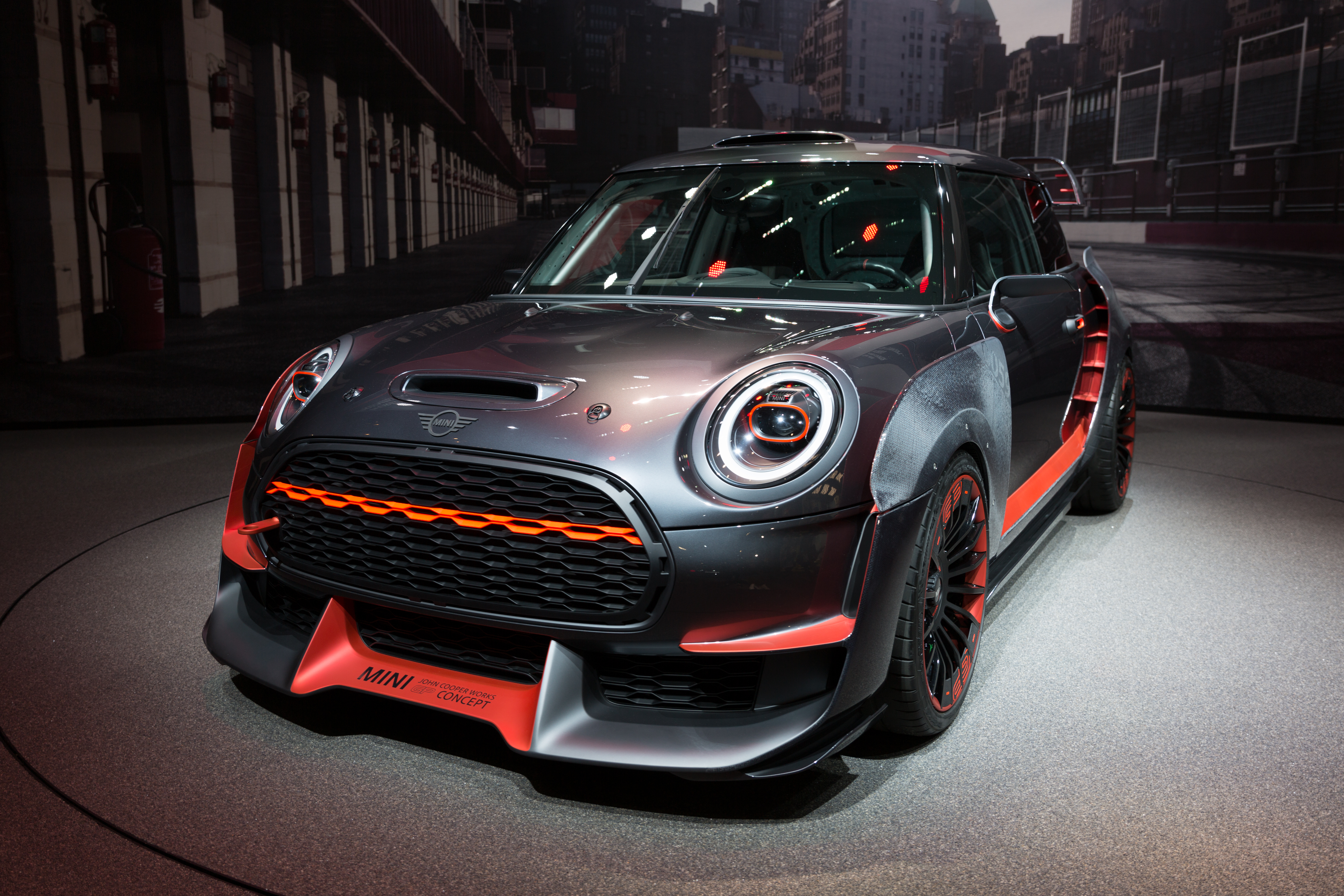
John Cooper Works GP Concept

The John Cooper Works GP Concept was presented during IAA 2017 in Frankfurt.

=== Vision Urbanaut Concept ===
The MINI brand presented the MINI Vision Urbanaut.
