= Morris 2200 =

Morris 2200 may refer to:

- A version of the BMC ADO17 automobile
- An early version of the Princess automobile
