= Roy Haynes (disambiguation) =

Roy Haynes (1925–2024) was an American jazz drummer.

Roy Haynes may also refer to:

- Roy Asa Haynes (1881–1940), Assistant Secretary of the Treasury in charge of Prohibition enforcement
- Roy Haynes (designer) (1924–2020), British car designer and stylist

== See also ==
- Roy Martin Haines (1924–2017), British historian
