= Austin 2200 =

Austin 2200 may refer to one of the following two automobiles:

- Austin 2200, a version of the BMC ADO17
- Austin 2200 HL, a version of the Princess
