= Harris Mann =

British car designer (1938–2023)

- Born: 27 April 1938
- Died: 14 August 2023 (aged 85)
- Occupations: Car designer and engineer
- Known for: Designer of the Morris Marina, Austin Allegro, Triumph TR7, and Austin Metro

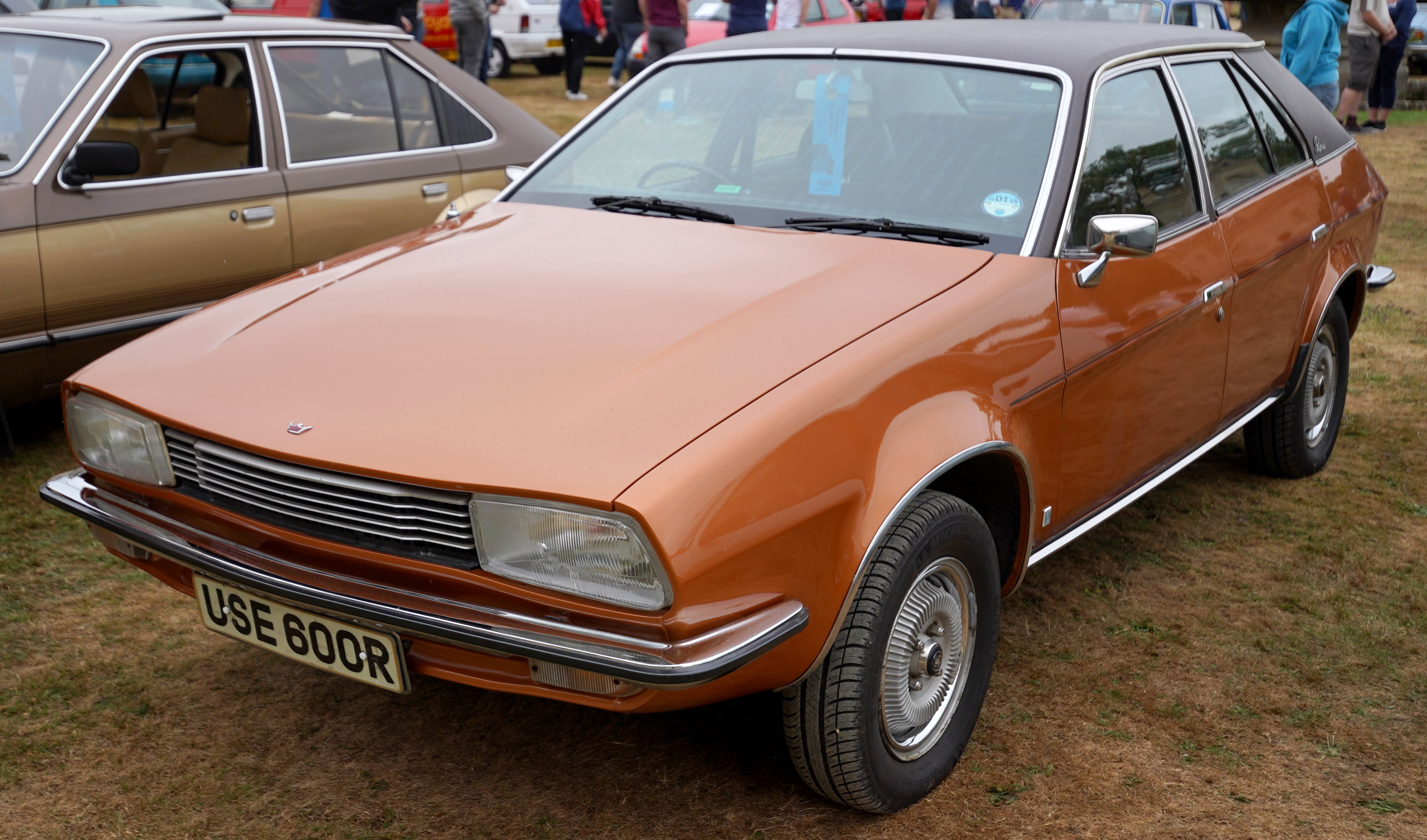
Princess

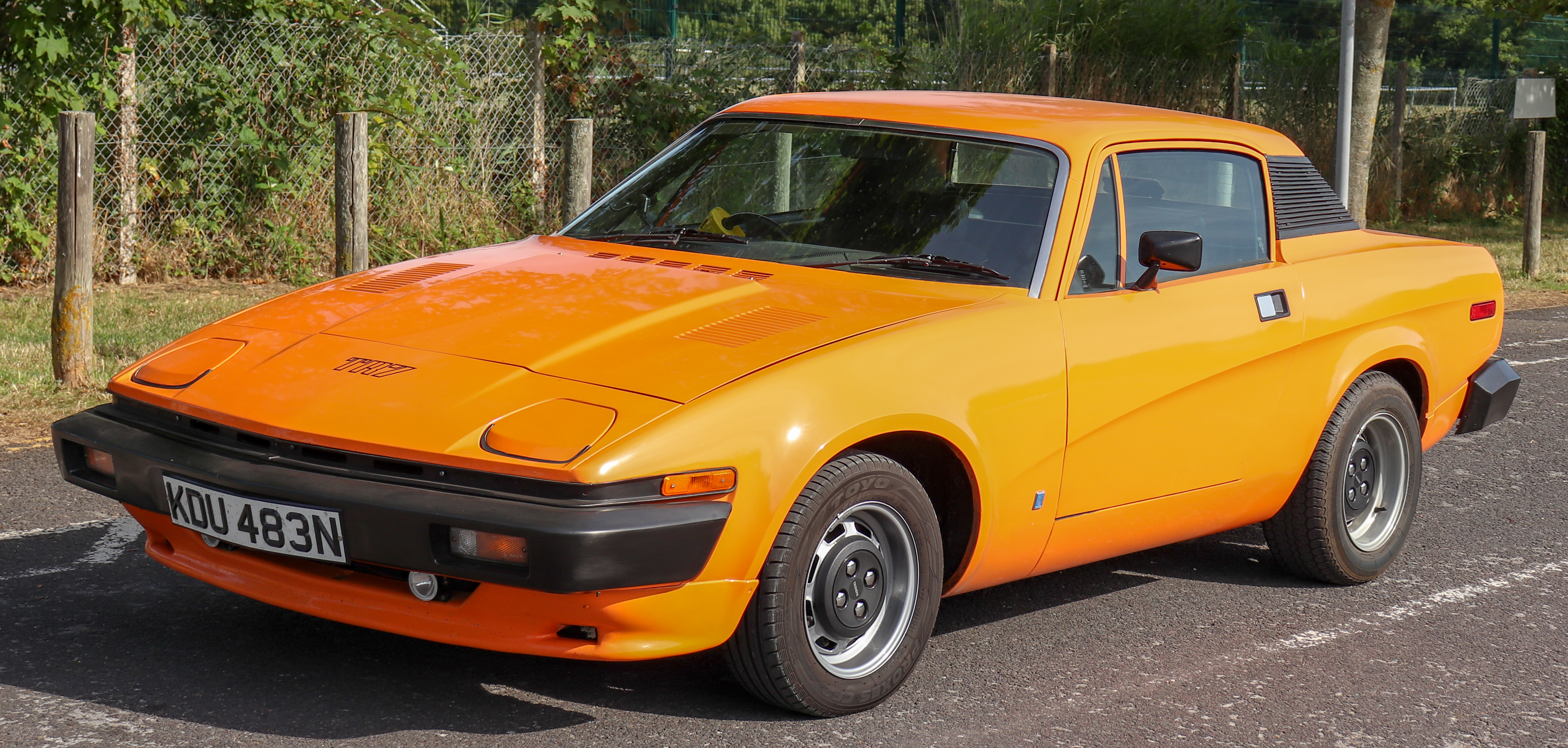
Triumph TR7

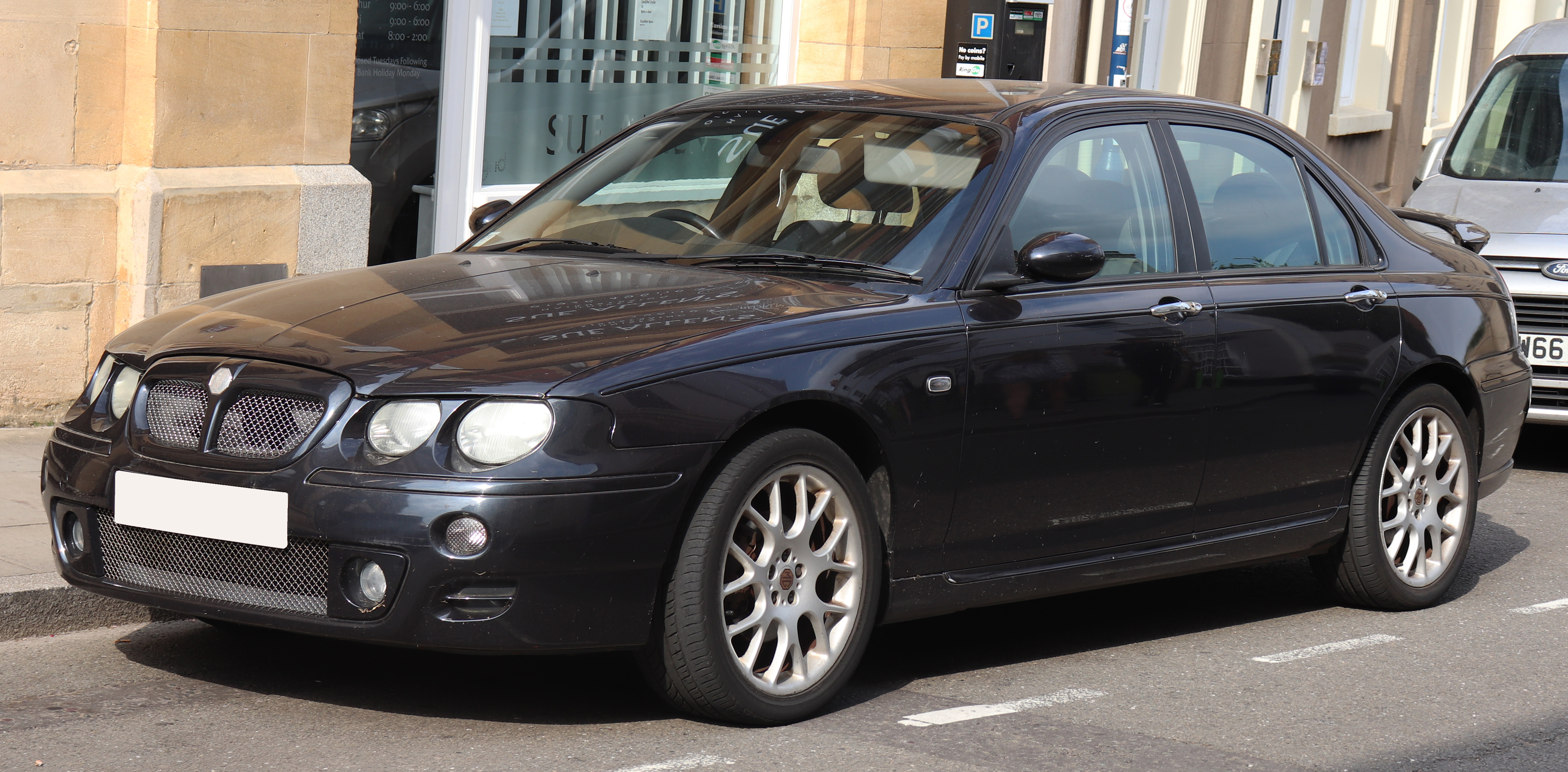
ZT

Harris William Mann (27 April 1938 – 14 August 2023) was a British car designer. He took over from Roy Haynes as chief stylist at British Leyland in 1970.

== Biography ==
Harris Mann was born in London on 27 April 1938, and attended engineering school in Westminster. His automotive design career started with the bus and coach building firm Duple, followed by a short time working in the U.S. with Loewy Consultancy. After a brief spell of National Service back in the UK, Mann worked for Commer, and then for Ford.

Cars on which Mann was involved at Ford included the first Escort and the Capri. His boss at Ford, Roy Haynes, persuaded Mann to go with him when, in 1967, he moved to BMC to lead the design studio at Cowley.

Mann worked alongside Haynes on the BMC Marina project and, when the design department they were working in was relocated to Longbridge, Haynes left the company, leaving Mann to lead the design team for, what was by then, British Leyland (BL).

Mann took over the Allegro project, and then worked on the Diablo project, which became the Princess. That was followed by the work for which he is most famous, the Triumph TR7. His final project with BL was the Metro, after which he left and went freelance. In that capacity he worked for MG Rover on the MG "Z" series (the ZR, ZS, and the ZT). He was also a design consultant for BMW in the mid-1980s, for which he was required to submit plans for a new corporate style and, in particular, to work on bonnet and boot shut lines and lights. According to Mann, "BMW shut lines were all over the place at that time". He proposed several designs to the BMW board, including the double headlight design, very reminiscent of the Princess, which is still seen on BMW cars today. Another legacy of Mann is the rectangular-shaped door handles that are common to the Morris Marina, Austin Allegro and Triumph TR7, and which were later used on the Range Rover and finally the Land Rover Discovery.

Later, Mann was involved in independent design consultancy in the automotive sector, and lectured in design at Coventry University.

Mann died on 14 August 2023, aged 85.
