= Roy Haynes (designer) =

British automobile designer

- Born: 12 March 1924
- Died: 22 March 2020 (aged 96)
- Occupations: Car designer and engineer

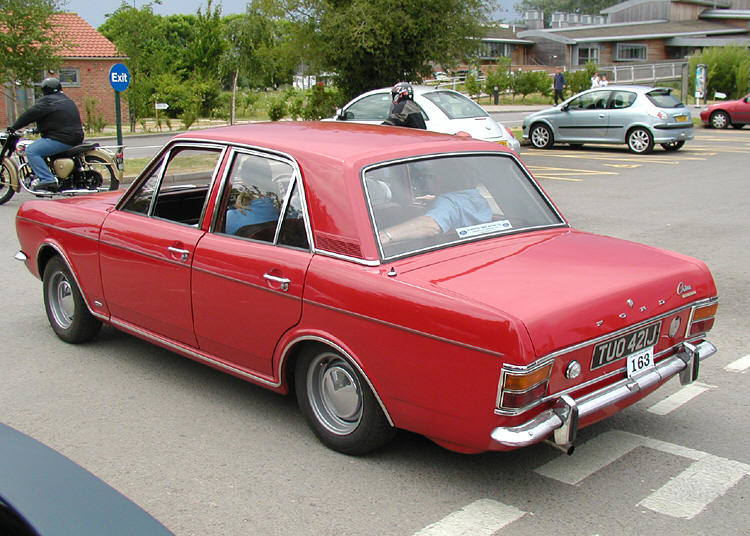
Ford Cortina MkII

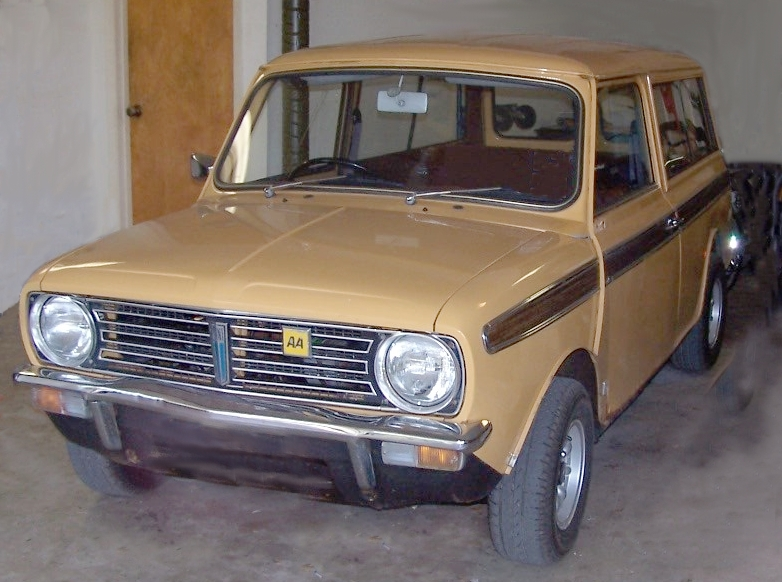
1976 Mini Clubman

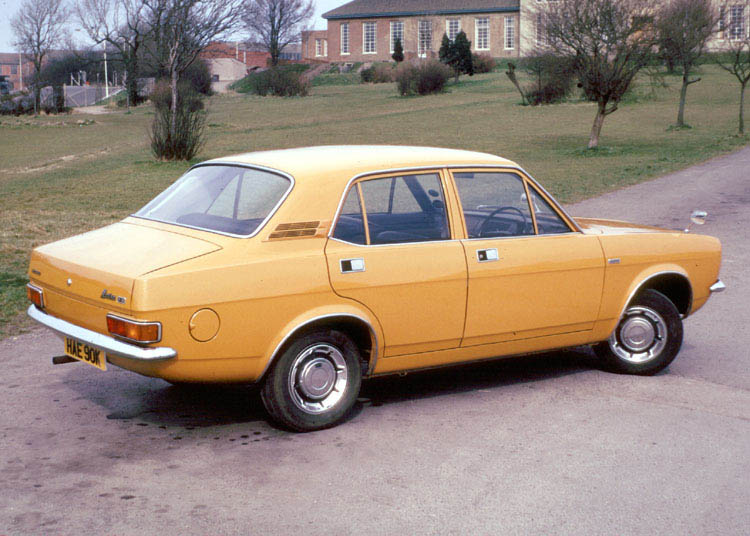
1973 Morris Marina

Roy Donald Haynes (12 March 1924 – 22 March 2020) was a British automobile designer. Haynes worked for Ford as model line director for Ford of Europe where he was responsible for the design of the 1966 Cortina MkII and worked on the design for the 1966 Ford Zodiac/Zephyr Mk4.

== Life and career ==
Roy Donald Haynes was born on 12 March 1924.

In 1967, he was recruited to BMC by Joe Edwards, working from the Pressed Steel Fisher studios in Cowley. While at BMC, Haynes put forward a plan to build models on just five platforms and reduce the number of brands to make the company profitable.

His first job was to work on the shortly to be released Austin Maxi, where he redesigned the front and rear ends. Further work was done on facelifting the successful AD016 Austin/Morris 1100 range, which failed to appear after the formation of the British Leyland (BL) in 1968 and was replaced by the Austin Allegro. Further projects included the 1969 Mini Clubman facelift for the Mini which had been planned as a hatchback in 1968 and the design of the 1971 Morris Marina, which were accepted by the management team at BL with minimal modifications; unexpected as he was up against designs by Pininfarina and Michelotti. Further projects included Project Condor which was a sports car based on the Morris Marina.

Haynes left BL in 1969, just 16 months after joining from Ford, as the new management team closed the Pressed Steel design studio at Cowley, moving the department to Longbridge. It was reported that the journey from his home in Essex was a step too far. Haynes was replaced as chief stylist of, what was by then, British Leyland in 1970 by Harris Mann, whom he had taken with him to BMC from Ford.

In 1976, Haynes formed ElecTraction Ltd Maldon, Essex and designed several electric vehicles for the company through his other company Roy Haynes Automotive International, including the Rickshaw, Tropicana and the concept Precinct, but the company closed in 1979. In 2012 in an interview with This is Total Essex, Haynes was promoting his idea for a new London airport design on Foulness Island in Essex.

Haynes died in Essex on 22 March 2020, at the age of 96.
