= Princess (car) =

Car produced in 1975–1982 by Austin-Morris

Austin/Morris/Wolseley 1800/2200 (until September 1975) Princess (thereafter)
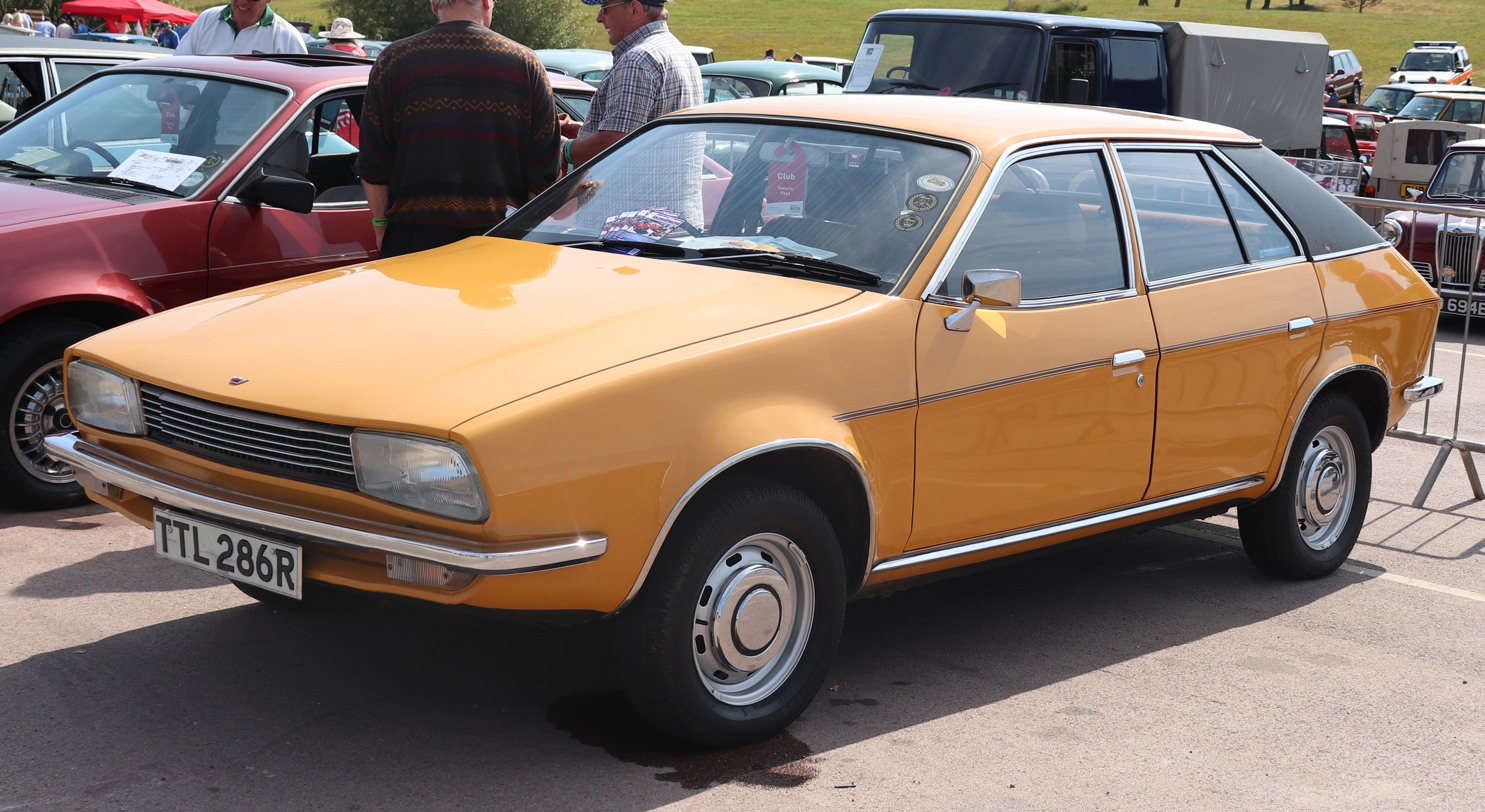
- 1977 Princess 2200 HL

Overview
- Manufacturer: British Leyland, Austin-Morris division
- Also called: Austin Princess (Switzerland, New Zealand, France, Italy, Denmark, Finland and Switzerland); Leyland Princess (Sweden, Norway, Finland, Belgium, Spain)
- Production: September 1975 – November 1981; 1977 – June 1982 (New Zealand)
- Assembly: United Kingdom: Cowley, Oxford (Cowley plant); New Zealand: Nelson (NZMC)
- Designer: Harris Mann

Body and chassis
- Class: Large family car
- Body style: 4-door saloon
- Layout: FF layout

Powertrain
- Engine: 1.8 L B-series pushrod I4 (Austin 1800 & Morris 1800 only); 2.2 L E-series SOHC I6 (Austin 2200, Morris 2200 & Wolseley Saloon only)
- Transmission: 4-speed manual all-synchromesh 3-speed automatic

Dimensions
- Wheelbase: 105 in (2,667 mm)
- Length: 175.4 in (4,455 mm)
- Width: 68.1 in (1,730 mm)
- Height: 55.5 in (1,410 mm)

Chronology
- Predecessor: Austin 1800 & 2200 (ADO17); Morris 1800 & 2200 (ADO17); Wolseley 18/85 & Six (ADO17)
- Successor: Austin Ambassador

The Princess is a large family car produced in the United Kingdom by the Austin-Morris division of British Leyland from 1975 until 1981 (1982 in New Zealand). The car inherited a front-wheel drive / transverse engine configuration from its predecessor, the Austin/Morris 1800 range. This was still unusual in Europe for family cars of this type and gave the Princess a cabin space advantage when compared with similarly sized cars from competing manufacturers.

The car, which had the design code ADO71, was originally marketed as the Austin / Morris / Wolseley 18–22 series. Ahead of the October 1975 London Motor Show the range was rebranded "Princess". This was effectively a new marque created by British Leyland, although the "Princess" name had previously been used for the Austin Princess limousine from 1947 to 1956, and the Vanden Plas Princess. The Princess is often referred to as the Austin Princess. Although this name was not used in the UK market, it was used officially in some export markets including Switzerland, New Zealand, France, Italy, Denmark, Finland and Switzerland. The name Leyland Princess was used in Sweden, Norway, Finland, Belgium and Spain.

The car was later revamped as the Austin Ambassador, a hatchback, which was produced from 1981 until 1984 and only available in Britain and Ireland.

Princess sales, although initially strong, were tailing off by the end of the 1970s. Some competitors had added a fifth door as a "hatchback", something the Princess lacked (though Harris Mann originally designed the car with a hatch) and the large family car sector fell victim to a poor economic climate further compounded by the OPEC oil crisis. The Princess was somewhere between the Ford Cortina and Ford Granada in terms of size, being designed to compete with more expensive versions of the Cortina as well as entry-level versions of the Granada. British Leyland restyled the Princess with a separate boot so that it would not compete with their existing SD1 and Maxi designs.

The limousine version was devised in late 1975 and produced on a small scale by Woodall Nicholson. Based on the top of the range Princess 2200 HLS, stretched at the B-pillar to allow more room for the rear compartment, the front door remained unchanged, making the car look oddly proportioned from the side. The Princess 2200 HLS Limousine was produced between 1975 and 1979, and was mostly sold to local borough councils (as a mayoral car) and to the funeral sector. The Princess limousine was a lower cost alternative to the Daimler DS420 for local government use.

Total production amounted to 224,942 units, with most examples scrapped by the 1990s.

== Launch of the Austin / Morris / Wolseley 18–22 series ==
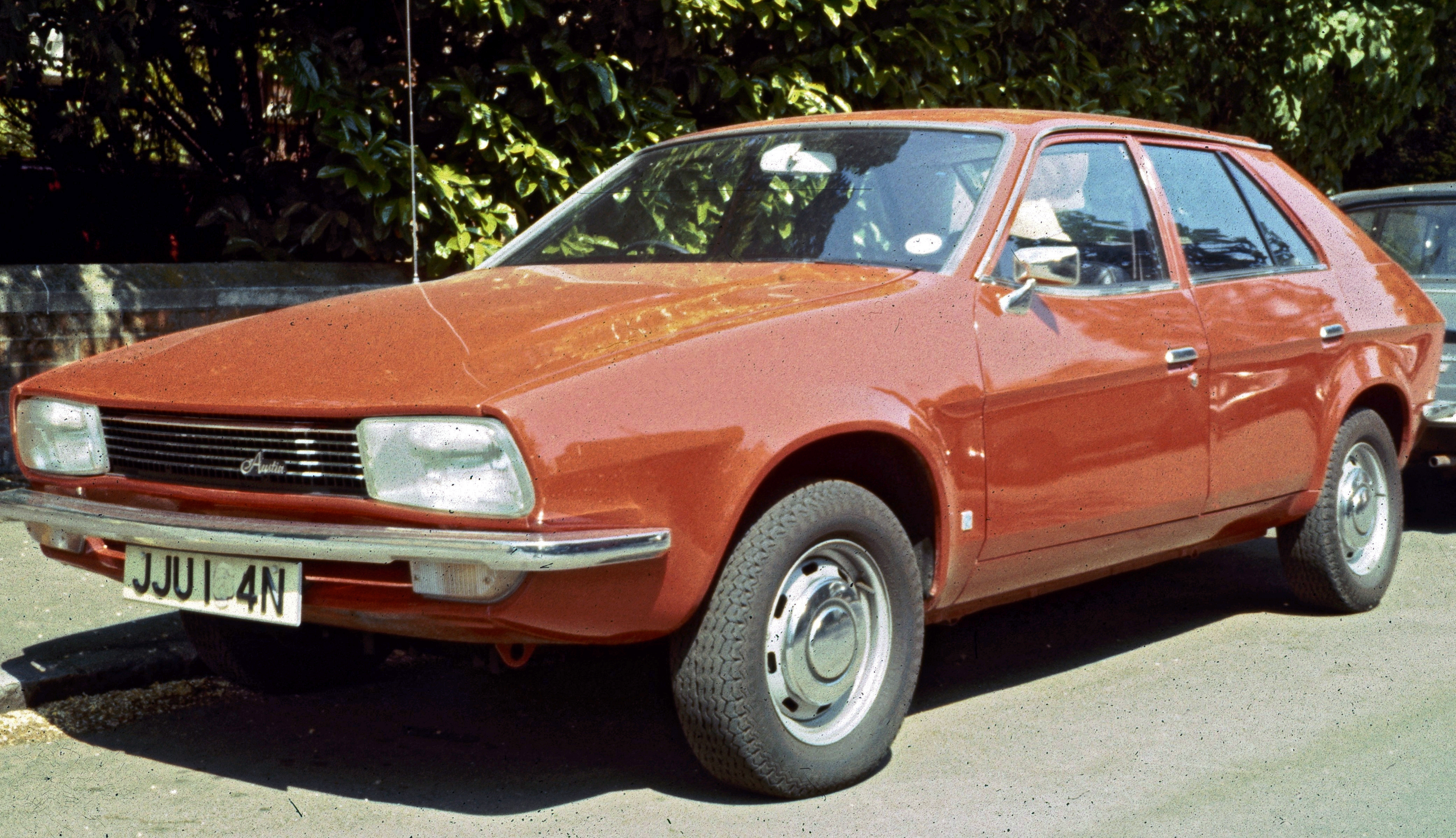
1975 Austin 1800 (ADO71)

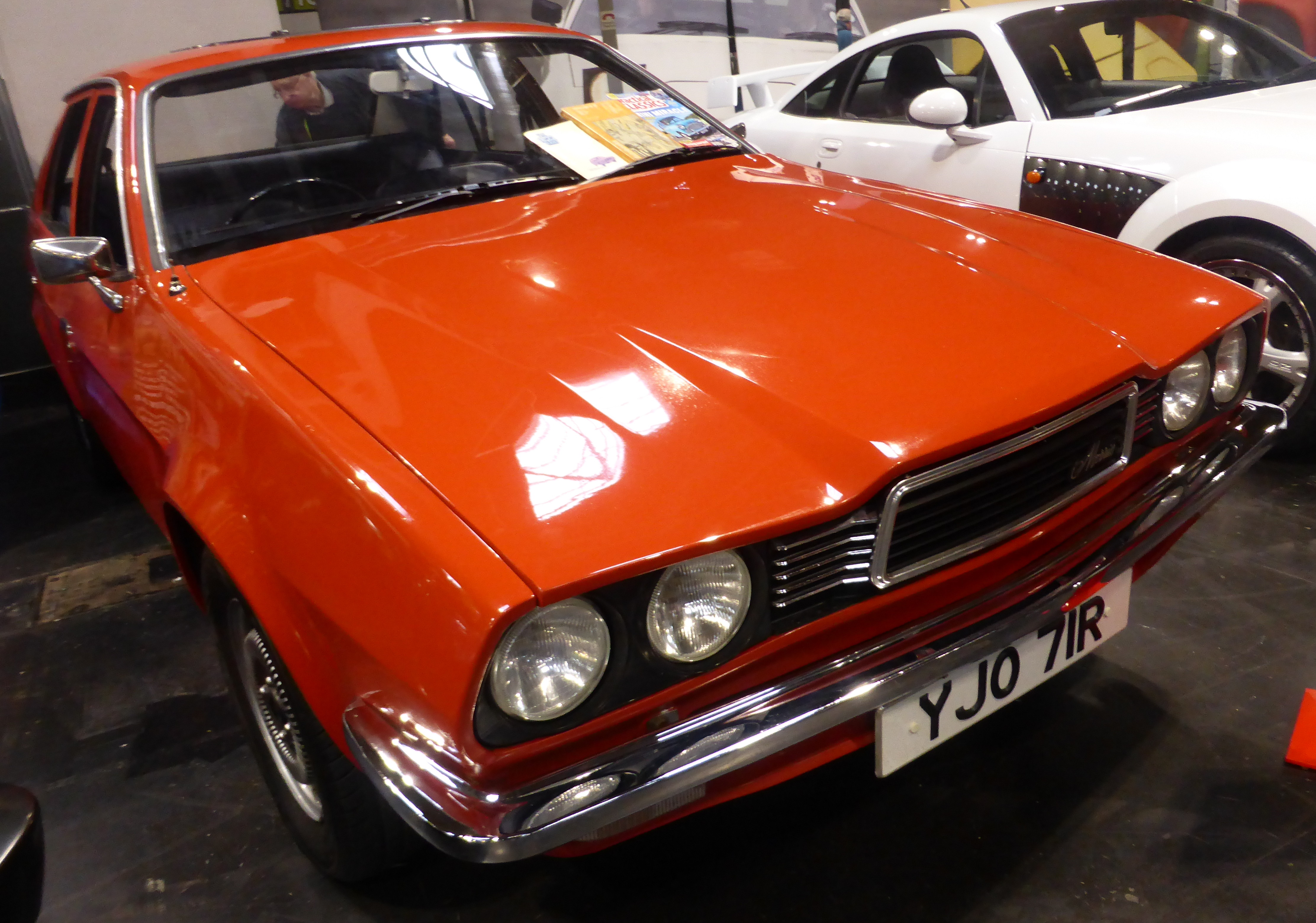
Morris 1800 (ADO71)

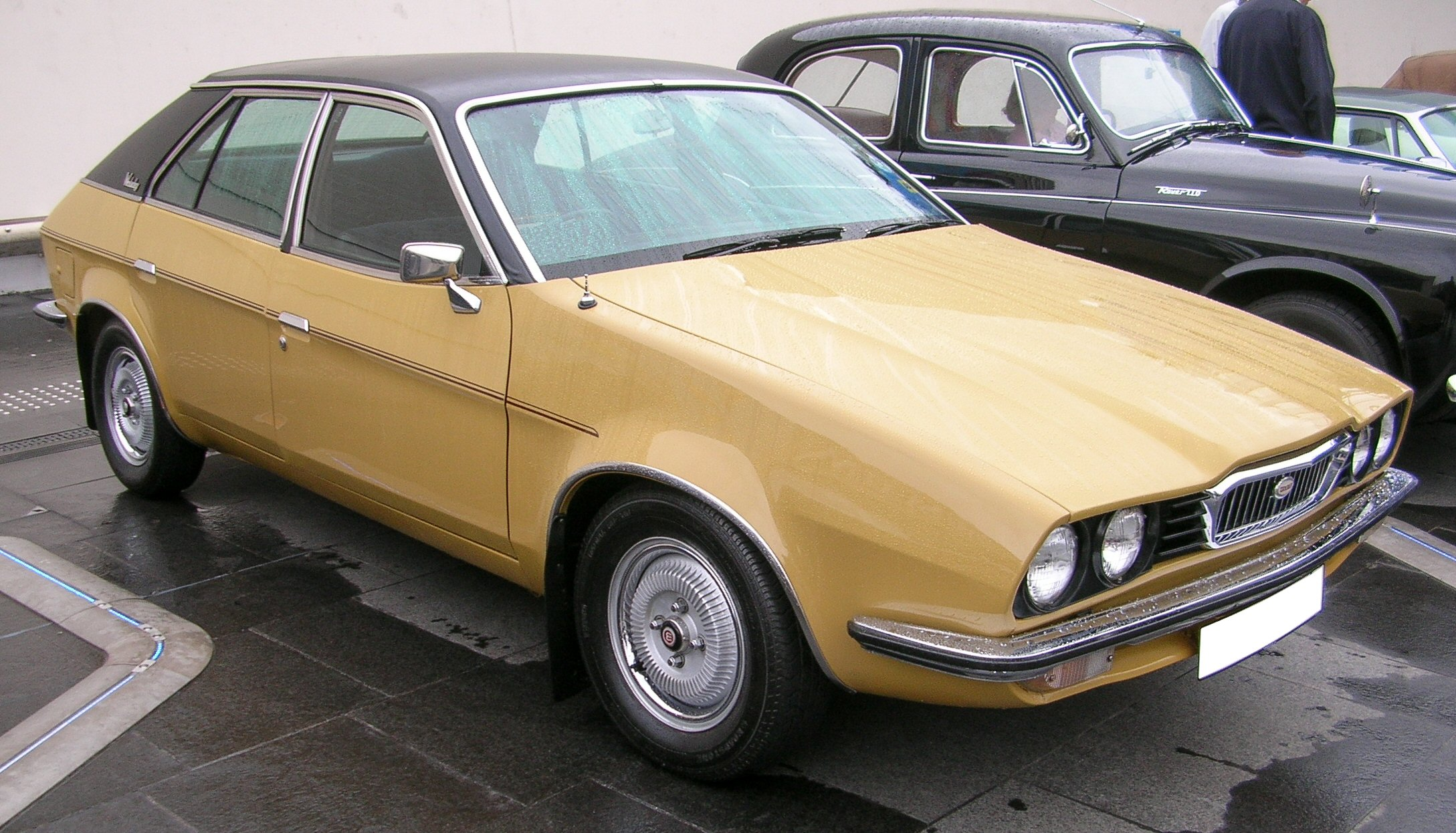
Wolseley Saloon

The car was launched on 26 March 1975 as the 18–22 series, "the car that has got it all together". The number designation 18–22 referred to the engine sizes available carried forward from the 1800 cc BMC B-series and 2200 cc E-series-engined BMC ADO 17 "Landcrab". For the first six months of production three badge-engineered versions were produced: Austin, Morris and Wolseley. The Austin model bore the original "design intent", featuring trapezoidal headlights and a simple horizontally vaned grille with added "Austin" script to the lower right side. The Morris and Wolseley cars bonnets had a raised "hump" permitting a larger, styled grille for each model; the Morris one was a simple chrome rectangle with "Morris" script in the lower right-hand corner, while Wolseleys had a chrome grille with the traditional illuminated Wolseley badge in the middle, with narrower vertical bars either side set back within the chromed surround. Both of these versions had four round headlights, and the Wolseley model was only available with the six-cylinder engine and luxury velour trim. Apart from their bonnet and headlamp designs, and of course their badging, the Austin and Morris models were virtually identical.

=== Models ===
Models	Years	Engine types	Transmissions
Austin 1800	March – September 1975	4-cyl 1798 cc B series	4-speed manual 3-speed automatic
Austin 1800 HL	March – September 1975	4-cyl 1798 cc B series	4-speed manual 3-speed automatic
Austin 2200 HL	March – September 1975	6-cyl 2227 cc E series	4-speed manual 3-speed automatic
Morris 1800	March – September 1975	4-cyl 1798 cc B series	4-speed manual 3-speed automatic
Morris 1800 HL	March – September 1975	4-cyl 1798 cc B series	4-speed manual 3-speed automatic
Morris 2200 HL	March – September 1975	6-cyl 2227 cc E series	4-speed manual 3-speed automatic
Wolseley Saloon	March – September 1975	6-cyl 2227 cc E series	4-speed manual 3-speed automatic

=== Styling ===
The exterior styling was distinctive, innovative, and somewhat divisive. "The Wedge", as it was often nicknamed, was indeed very wedge-shaped; the styling was all angles and slanting panels. This was very much a 1970s design as created by Italian stylists (see Lamborghini Countach for example). Within BL the car was often referred to as "The Anteater". The designer, Harris Mann, was also responsible for the Triumph TR7, another wedge-shaped car, as was his original design for the Austin Allegro, although by the time that design had been readied for production nearly all the angular styling features had been lost.

The Princess, unlike the Allegro, made it to regular production relatively unscathed and unaltered from Mann's original plan. The bonnet (hood) was a little higher, to allow for taller engines, but the biggest change from Mann's design involved the rear. Man had intended the design to be a five-door hatchback, but management decided that the Austin Maxi should be the only hatchback in the range, making that its unique selling point, and besides, they thought the Princess's prospective buyers would dislike a hatchback – despite the fact that in the Rover division the larger Rover SD1 was being given a hatchback design. Consequently, the Princess received fixed rear glass and a separate boot, belying its appearance. An estate version was also proposed, but never reached production.

=== Mechanical details ===
The base engine fitted was the 1798 cc B-series pushrod straight-4. The lay-out closely followed that of the predecessor model, but access to the alternator/water pump was greatly improved by exploiting the car's longer nose to fit a front-mounted radiator. The basic design of the engine dated back to 1947 and the unit with a claimed output of 84 bhp was notably lacking in power, although torque was reasonable. The larger engine, fitted to upper models in the range, was a 2227 cc E-series SOHC straight-6. This was very smooth and a much more modern engine, with a published output figure of 110 bhp, but was still not hugely powerful. The Princess was a big car, and the engine choice gave lacklustre performance, not helped by the provision of only a 4-speed manual gearbox (a Borg-Warner automatic transmission was an option). Suspension used BL's Hydragas system.

=== Performance and price comparison ===
A six-cylinder car was road tested by Britain's Autocar magazine in March 1975 at the time of the model's launch. It recorded a maximum speed of 104 mph (167 km/h) and reached 60 mph (97 km/h) from a standing start in 13.5 seconds. The top speed was marginally lower than the 109 mph (175 km/h) achieved by a recently tested Ford Consul 2500 L, and a full three seconds slower to 60 mph than the Ford which managed the standing start test in 10.4 seconds. The 2200 also fell slightly behind the Fiat 132GLS 1800 in these comparisons. At the same time, its overall fuel consumption at 20.7 mpg was superior to the Ford's 18.1 mpg. The lighter Fiat was more frugal with fuel than either of the other two. On price, the Austin's domestic market recommended retail prices including taxes of £2,424 was significantly higher than the £2,221 charged for the Ford.

Although its performance figures on paper were a little underwhelming, the testers were impressed with the roominess and roadholding of the Austin 2200. They found it quiet and comfortable, the driving position in particular representing a vast improvement over the car's predecessor. They mentioned in passing that the boot/trunk on the test car "leaked slightly", but did not labour the point.

The Princess was similar in size to the Ford Cortina, and was marketed by British Leyland as a rival to the larger engined versions of the Cortina, as well as smaller engined versions of the Ford Granada.

== Princess ==
Princess
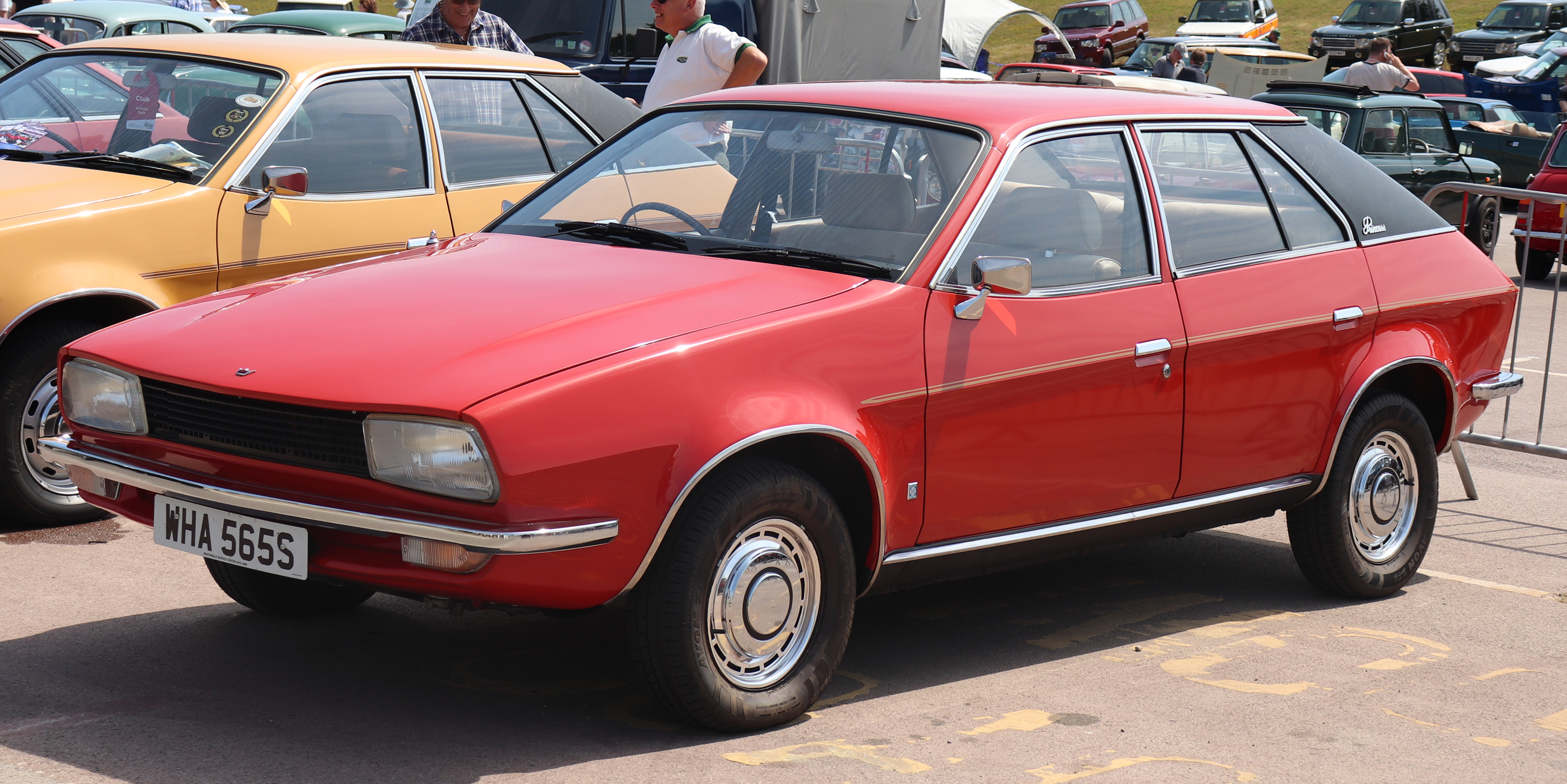
- 1975–1978 Princess

Overview
- Manufacturer: British Leyland
- Also called: Austin Princess (New Zealand)
- Production: September 1975 – July 1978

Body and chassis
- Class: Large family car (D)
- Body style: 4-door saloon

Powertrain
- Engine: 1.8 L B-series pushrod I4; 2.2 L E-series SOHC I6

Chronology
- Predecessor: Austin 18-22; Morris 18-22; Wolseley Saloon
- Successor: Princess 2

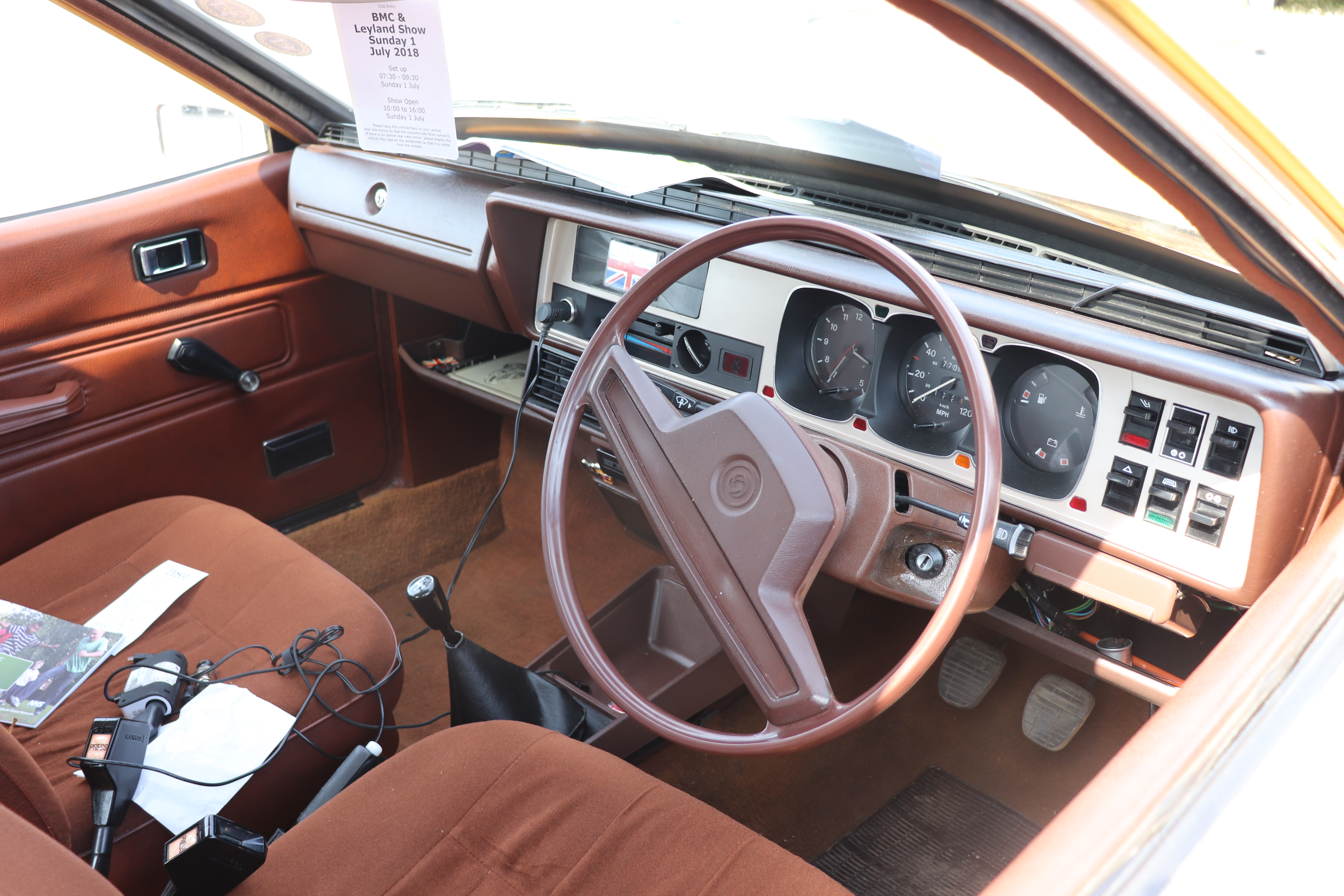
interior of a 1977 model

After the publication of the Ryder Report in March 1975, one of its key recommendations was to consolidate the many British Leyland brands into a single "Leyland Cars" organisation with a common dealer network for all marques and models. By September 1975, the process of unifying Austin and Morris dealerships was advanced sufficiently, while the Wolseley marque was to be abandoned. Thus, the policy of selling seven 18–22 series models under three different marques was changed and the range was reduced to four models all sold under the Princess name. All cars now used the Austin version’s flat bonnet and horizontally vaned grille, a crown badge was affixed to the point of the bonnet and the script word "Princess" was affixed to the grille replacing the "Austin" script, the thick vinyl-clad C-pillars and the boot. The 1800 models bore the twin headlights, with the 2200 models sporting the wedge-shaped headlights Harris Mann had designed the car to be seen with.

Build quality of the Princess was affected by poor quality control and constant industrial disputes; it gained a reputation for unreliability it could never shake off, even though quality improved in later years. The styling, praised upon introduction, was soon labelled "ugly". To quote a phrase in Parker's Car Price Guide from the 1990s, "an early critic suggested that the people responsible for designing the front and rear of the car were not speaking to one another".

=== Models ===
Models	Years	Engine types	Transmissions
Princess 1800	September 1975 – July 1978	4-cyl 1798 cc B series	4-speed manual 3-speed automatic
Princess 1800 HL	September 1975 – July 1978	4-cyl 1798 cc B series	4-speed manual 3-speed automatic
Princess 2200 HL	September 1975 – July 1978	6-cyl 2227 cc E series	4-speed manual 3-speed automatic
Princess 2200 HLS	September 1975 – July 1978	6-cyl 2227 cc E series	4-speed manual 3-speed automatic

== Princess 2 ==
Princess 2
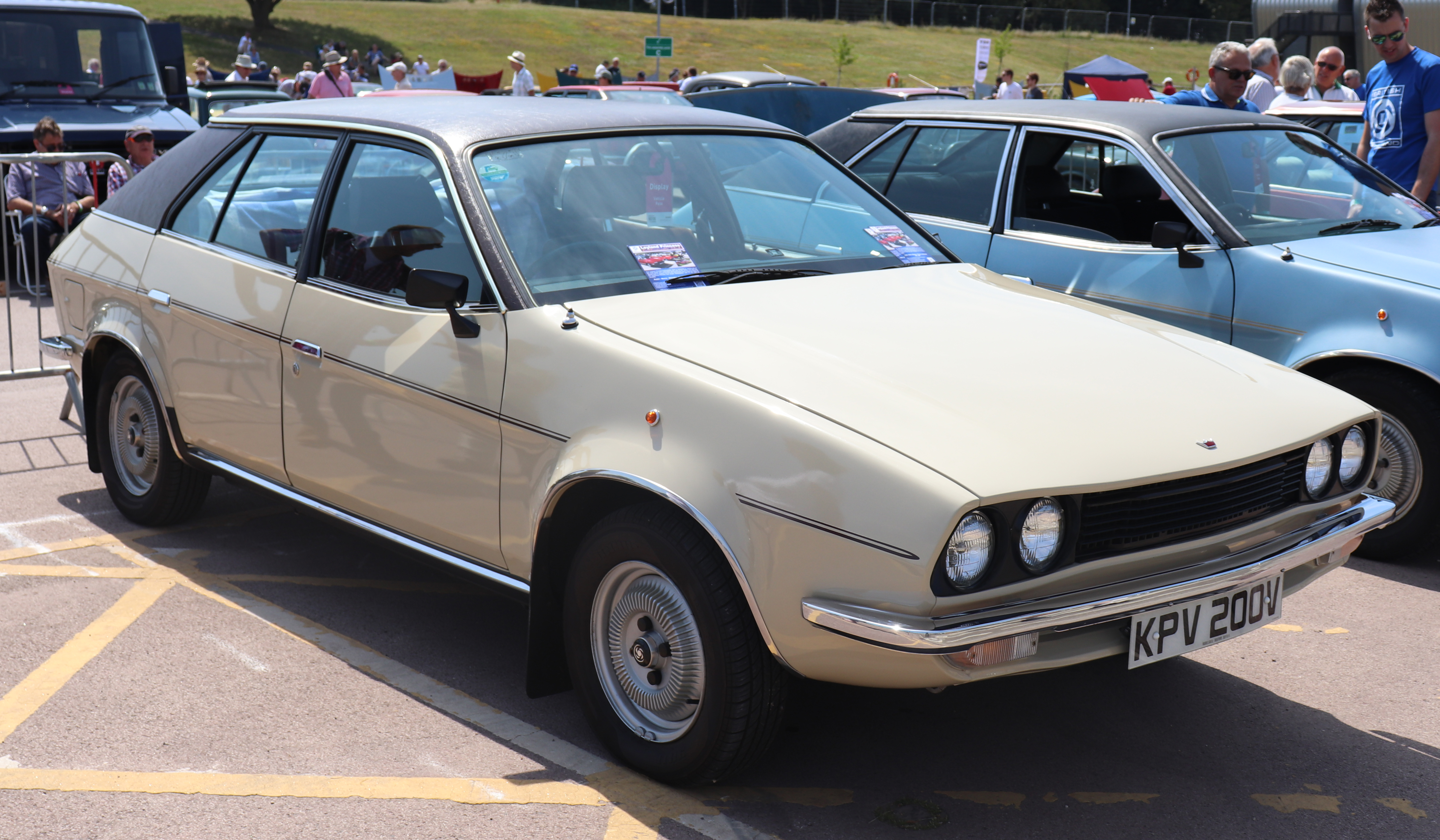
- 1980 Princess 2 HL 1.7

Overview
- Manufacturer: British Leyland
- Also called: Austin Princess 2 (New Zealand)
- Production: July 1978 – November 1981

Body and chassis
- Class: Large family car (D)
- Body style: 4-door saloon

Powertrain
- Engine: 1.7 L O-series SOHC I4; 2.0 L O-series SOHC I4; 2.2 L E-series SOHC I6

Chronology
- Predecessor: Princess
- Successor: Austin Ambassador

In July 1978, the Princess was given a revamp and renamed the Princess 2. The main change was the replacement of the 1800 cc B-series engine with the new O-series engine. The new engine was offered in two sizes: 1695 cc and 1993 cc. Since there was an 1800 cc tax barrier for company cars at the time, the 1700 cc O-series engine was developed to take advantage of that, whilst the 2000 cc engine was developed for the private motorists who wanted something different from the hugely popular Ford Cortina. The L and HL models had the twin headlamps and the HLS models got the trapezoids. The car had perhaps reached its pinnacle when the prestigious Motoring Which publication described the Princess 2200 HLS automatic model as "An excellent car, marred only by poor reliability".

Production of the Princess ceased in November 1981.

The basic Princess design lived on in revised form until 1984 as the Austin Ambassador.

=== Models ===
Models	Years	Engine Types	Transmissions
Princess 2 1700 L	July 1978 – November 1981	4-cyl 1695 cc O series	4-speed manual 3-speed automatic
Princess 2 1700 HL	July 1978 – November 1981	4-cyl 1695 cc O series	4-speed manual 3-speed automatic
Princess 2 1700 HLS	May 1979 – March 1980	4-cyl 1695 cc O series	4-speed manual 3-speed automatic
Princess 2 2000 HL	July 1978 – November 1981	4-cyl 1993 cc O series	4-speed manual 3-speed automatic
Princess 2 2000 HLS	May 1979 – November 1981	4-cyl 1993 cc O series	4-speed manual 3-speed automatic
Princess 2 2200 HL	July 1978 – January 1979	6-cyl 2227 cc E series	4-speed manual 3-speed automatic
Princess 2 2200 HLS	July 1978 – November 1981	6-cyl 2227 cc E series	4-speed manual 3-speed automatic

== New Zealand – Austin Princess ==
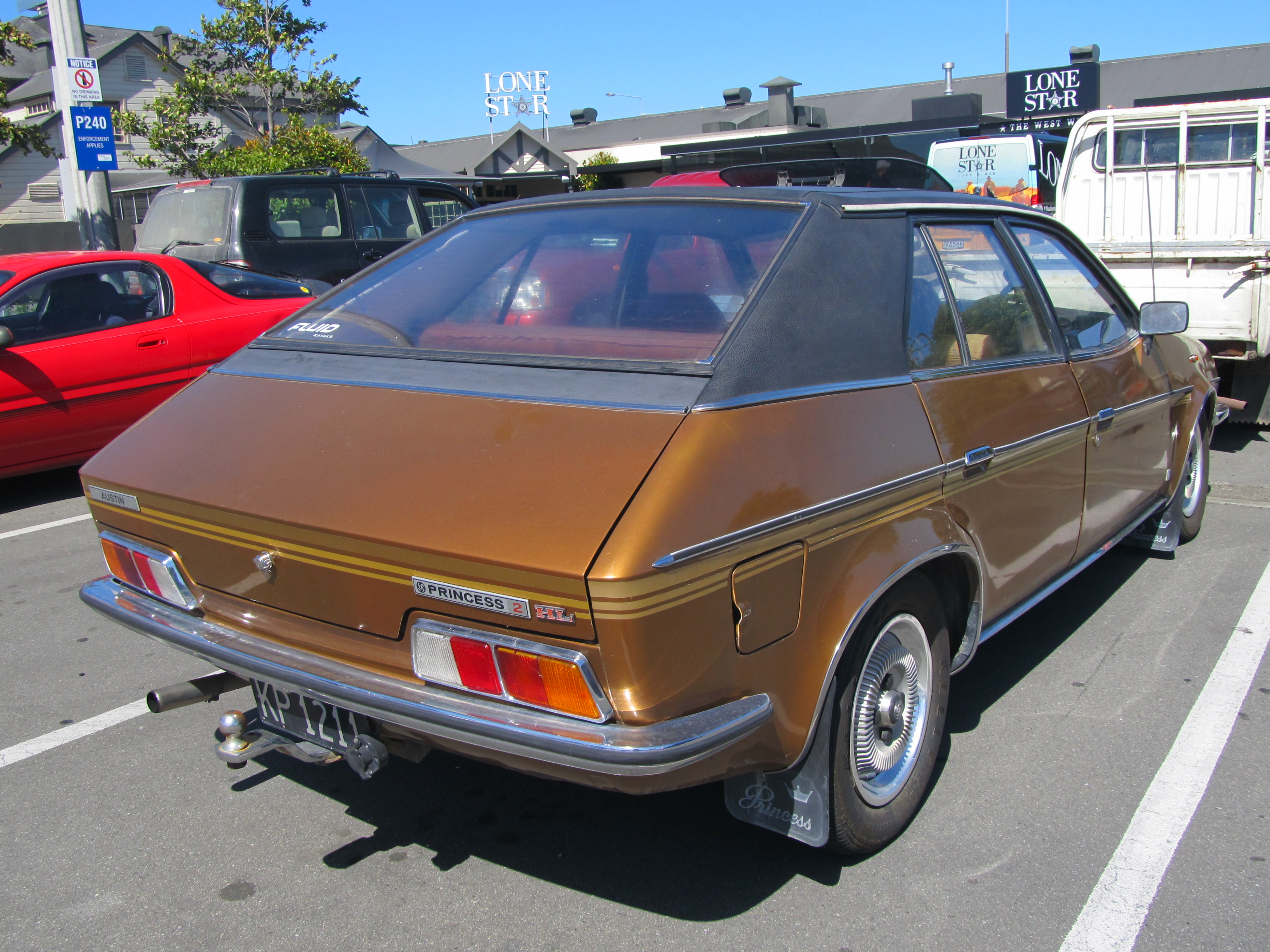
1982 Austin Princess 2 HL in New Zealand. The Princess was badged as an Austin in that country.

In New Zealand the car was officially sold as the Austin Princess. Assembled in the New Zealand Motor Corporation's plant in Nelson, it was introduced to the market in 1977 and utilized the Austin 1800 B-series engine.

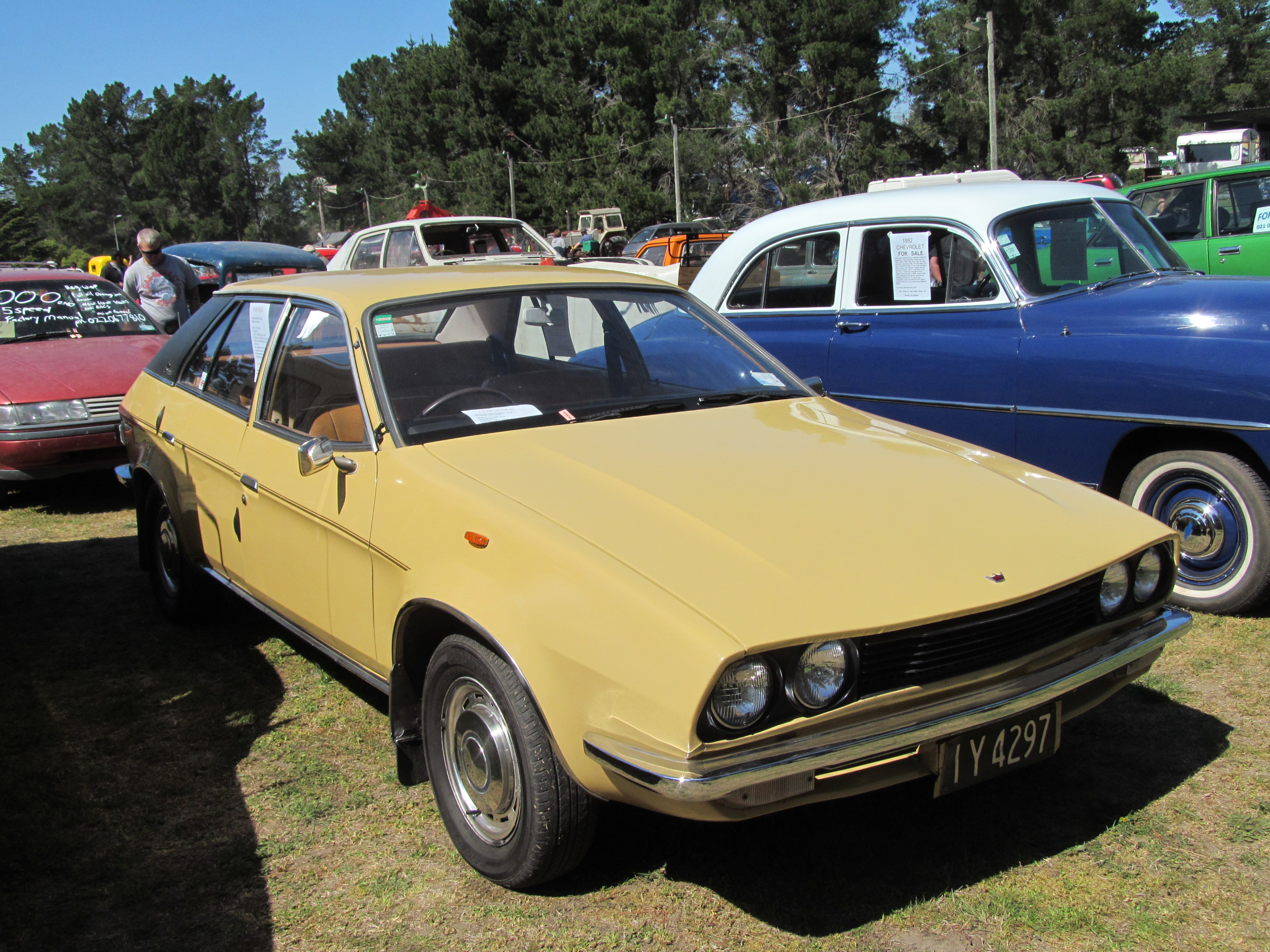
New Zealand market 1978 Austin Princess 1800 HL (B-series engine)

In early 1979, the car was re-engined with the BL O-series OHC motor. Due to a conflict of the Austin Princess and Morris Marina competing in the same market sector in New Zealand, the Princess got a 2.0 L unit mounted transversely, while the Marina (which was face-lifted at that time and renamed in NZ as "Morris 1700") received the 1.7 L unit mounted longitudinally.

Being competitively priced, the Princess proved a popular car on the New Zealand market, and proved to be a popular alternative to the rear-wheel-drive Ford Cortina, Mitsubishi Sigma and Holden Commodore ranges.

Local production of the car ended in June 1982, when the completely knocked-down kits of the car had been used up. The Austin Princess R, the last model sold there, was still on new-car price lists in 1983, and was available only in black to commemorate the end of local assembly of a long line of Austin cars.

== Torcars Princess Estate ==
The Princess designer Harris Mann intended it to be a hatchback and Torcars created a conversion designed to meet the growing demand for fifth-door saloons which was dealer approved. The Torcars Princess Estate was available in 1800 or 2200 engine sizes, with manual or automatic gearboxes.

The original sleek wedge profile was completely retained but the tailgate revealed an enormous loadspace accessible by probably the largest estate car aperture available on any European car at the time. With the rear seat lowered there is a load length of nearly 6 feet (1.8 m), a load width averaging 4 feet (1.2 m), a load height of nearly 3 feet (0.91 m), and an overall carrying capacity of 54 cubic feet (assuming Dunlop Denovo run-flat wheels and tyres are fitted, obviating the need for a spare wheel).

Also included as standard items not available on the standard Princess were a wash-wipe system for the rear screen and a fully carpeted luggage area.
