= Plant Oxford =

Auto plant in Cowley, England

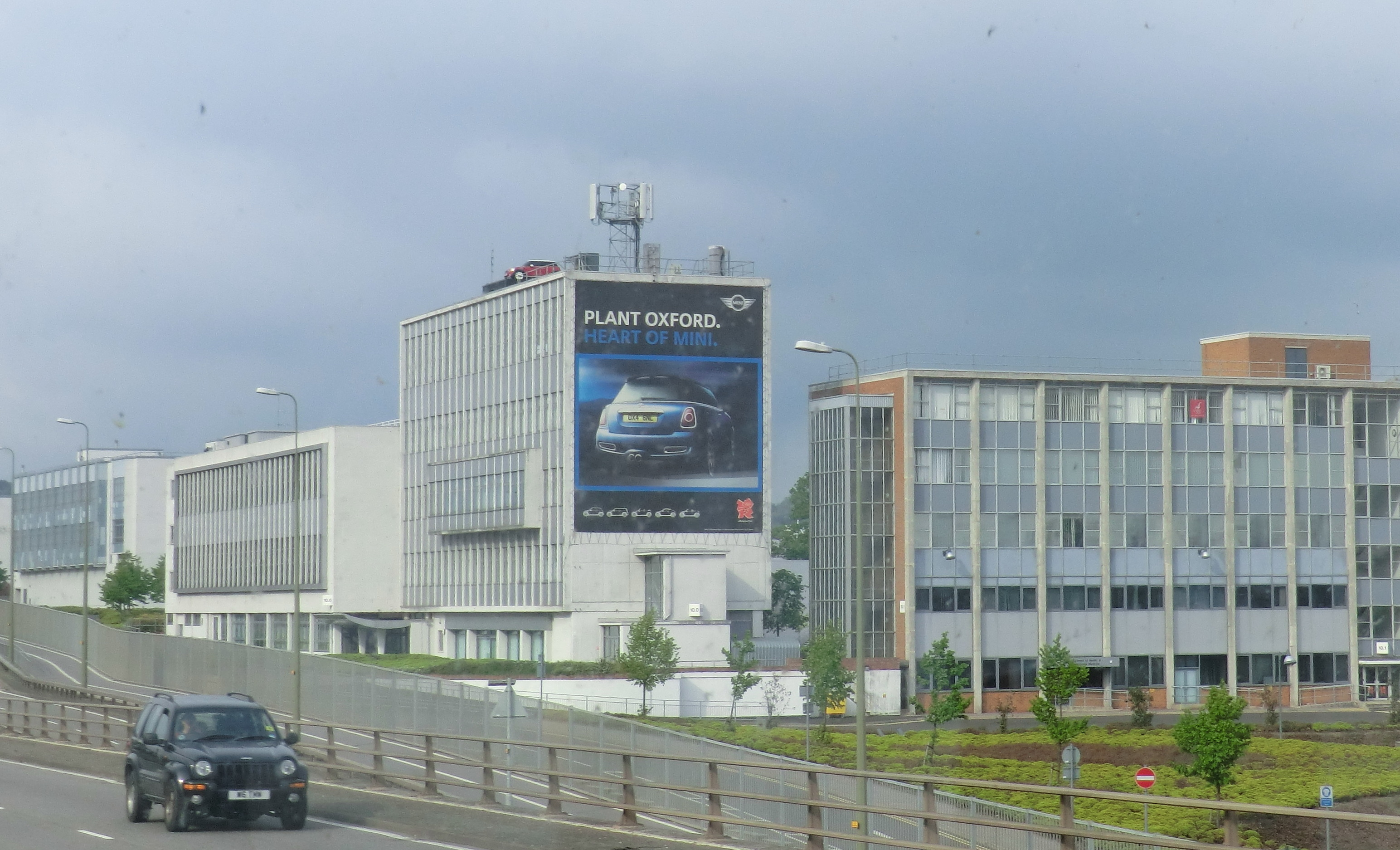
Plant Oxford on the Oxford Ring Road (A4142)

Plant Oxford located in Cowley, southeast Oxford, England, is a BMW car assembly facility where Mini cars are built. The plant forms the Mini production triangle along with Plant Hams Hall where engines are manufactured and Plant Swindon where body pressings and sub-assemblies are built.

The original Morris Motors site at Cowley had three manufacturing plants, separated by the eastern Oxford Ring Road and B480 road. The present site of Plant Oxford was the car body manufacturing business of the Pressed Steel Company, later known as Pressed Steel Fisher, which was founded in 1926. The north and south car assembly plants were originally Morris Motors plants, later part of British Leyland and latterly the Rover Group. The whole site was reorganised in the 1990s and now only the original Pressed Steel portion of the site remains.

== History ==
In 1912, William Morris bought the former Oxford Military College in Cowley. Moving his company into the new site, from 1914 onwards Morris pioneered Henry Ford-style mass production in the UK, by building what became affectionately known as "the old tin shed." In 1925, Morris opened his own printing division, Morris Oxford Press, later Nuffield Press, taking up some of the original military college buildings.

To facilitate more efficient production, the Great Western Railway opened Morris Cowley railway station to serve the thousands of workers commuting to the factory. In 1933, they built a railway goods yard beside the Wycombe Railway to bring supplies into the factory, and take completed vehicles away. This railway yard still exists today and serves the current vehicle-manufacturing plant, though the railway to High Wycombe has long been lifted.

As Cowley expanded into a huge industrial centre, it attracted workers during the Great Depression looking for work. This resulted in the need for new housing, including from the 1920s Florence Park, built mainly by private landlords. Like many contemporary industrialists of the time, Morris wanted to provide for the whole life of its workers, and so developed the Morris Motors Athletic & Social Club on Crescent Road, which still exists today.

=== World War II ===
Approached in 1935 by the Air Ministry about the factory's ability to change to aircraft industry production, additional capacity was built into the factory through the shadow factory plan from 1937. During World War II, the factory produced the de Havilland Tiger Moth training aeroplane. Also developed on site was the No 1 Metal and Produce Recovery Depot run by the Civilian Repair Organisation, to handle crashed or damaged aircraft, and even the processing of wreckage from enemy Luftwaffe aircraft. Artist Paul Nash was inspired to paint Totes Meer based on sketches he made of the recovery depot.

=== Post war ===
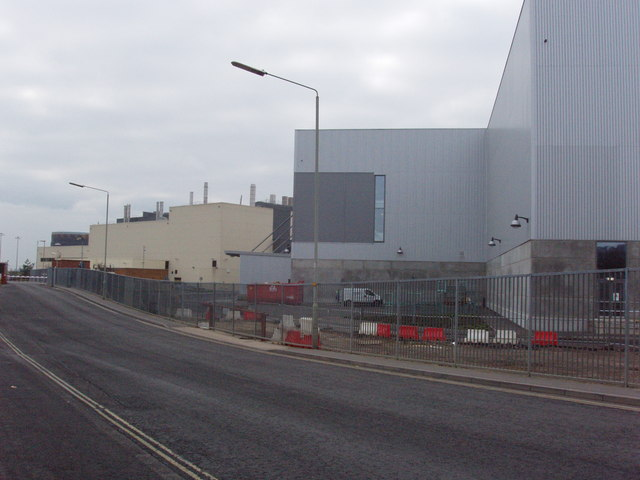
South-east facing side of Plant Oxford on Roman Way

For a detailed history on the post-war management of the factory, refer to the articles on British Motor Corporation, British Leyland, and Rover Group

Despite successive company mergers and name changes, "Morris's" is still often used as the name of the car factory to this day. A brief timeline of the plant's history is as follows:

- 1952 - Morris Motors merges with the Austin Motor Company to form the British Motor Corporation (BMC)
- 1966 - BMC acquires both Pressed Steel and Jaguar to create British Motor Holdings (BMH)
- 1968 - BMH merges with Leyland Motors to become British Leyland (BL), "Austin-Morris" becomes the name for the mass-market car manufacturing division of BL.
- 1982 - After much restructuring following its bankruptcy and nationalisation in 1975, BL renames its mass market car manufacturing subsidiary Austin Rover. Morris Ital production moves to Longbridge, marking the end of Morris badged cars at Cowley. Rover SD1 production moves to Cowley from Solihull; the plant would now make all Rover executive cars from that point on.
- 1986 - BL is renamed the Rover Group, the Austin Rover brand is later dropped and only the Land Rover, Rover and MG brands survive.
- 1988 - The Rover Group is sold to British Aerospace, with Honda maintaining a 20% stake in the business.
- 1994 - British Aerospace sells Rover to BMW, and Nuffield Press leaves the site
- 2000 - BMW sells Rover Group (divesting the Solihull and Longbridge plants), but retains the Cowley plant for MINI production and renames it Plant Oxford.

By the early 1970s, over 20,000 people worked in Cowley at the vast British Leyland and Pressed Steel Fisher plants. After re-organisation, PSF became part of the reorganised Austin Rover, while parts Unipart was floated off in a management buyout, but still has its global headquarters next to the Morris plant. Throughout the 1970s and 1980s, the Cowley Assembly Plant (the former Morris Motors factory) faced a high level of industrial action, a problem which successive management teams struggled to resolve.

Much rationalisation took place at the plant in the early 1980s, as BL restructured its manufacturing operations in the light of the Ryder Report. Production of the Austin Maxi ended in 1981 to make way for the Honda-based Triumph Acclaim, whilst production of the Princess range was axed in 1981 to allow the arrival of production of the Rover SD1 following the closure of the car production lines at Solihull, which was retained solely for the production of Land Rover vehicles. Future large Rovers would therefore be built at Cowley until the BMW sell-off in 2000.

The Morris marque was abandoned in 1984, when production of the Longbridge-built Morris Ital finished; it had been transferred there from Cowley in September 1982, two years after its launch. The transfer of the Ital from Cowley was to make way for the Austin Maestro and Montego, which were launched in March 1983 and April 1984 respectively, continued in production until December 1994, though production was gradually cut back after 1989 following the launch of the successful Longbridge-built Rover 200 and 400 series models.

In 1992, Rover sold the entire site to property group Arlington Securities, itself later sold to the Australian property company Macquarie Goodman, now the Goodman Group and most of the old site was demolished.

Owner of Rover Group, British Aerospace, agreed a partnership with Honda, with Honda taking a 20% stake in the company, in return for joint-development of the new Rover 600 and 800, both produced at Cowley. The 800 Series had been launched in mid 1986 and facelifted at the start of 1992; a year before the launch of the 600 Series.

Despite 1989 seeing a then record of more than 2.3 million new cars being sold in the United Kingdom, falling demand for the 800 Series resulted in 1,800 job cuts at Cowley being announced in October of that year.

On 31 January 1994, BAe announced sale of its 80% majority share of Rover Group to BMW. On 21 February, Honda announced it was selling its 20% share of Rover Group, resulting in problems in Rover's supply chain which was highly reliant on Honda. BMW invested heavily in Rover, and particularly the Cowley plant, which became the production centre for the new Rover 75 in late 1998. However, when BMW broke up the Rover Group on its sale 18 months later, production of the Rover 75 was switched to Longbridge, while BMW retained the rights to build the new Mini and retained the Cowley plant to produce it at.

== Models produced ==
Morris Motors/BMC/British Leyland/Austin Rover/Rover Group

- Morris Oxford bullnose (1913–1916, 1919–1926)
- Morris Cowley bullnose (1915–1920, 1919–1926)
- Morris Oxford flatnose (1926–1930)
- Morris Cowley flatnose (1926–1931)
- Morris Oxford Empire models (1926–1929)
- Morris Six (1927–1929)
- Morris Minor (1928–1934)
- Morris Oxford Six (1929–1935)
- Morris Isis (1929–1935)
- Morris Major (1930–1933)
- Morris Cowley Twelve (1931–1934)
- Morris Ten (1932–1935, 1935–1937, 1937–1948)
- Morris Twelve (1934–1935, 1935–1937, 1937–1948)
- Morris Cowley Six (1934–1935)
- Morris 8 (1935–1938, 1938–1948)
- Morris Fourteen Six (1935–1939)
- Morris Fifteen Six (1935–1939)
- Morris Big Six (1935–1939)
- Morris Minor (1948–1971)
- Morris Six MS (1948–1953)
- Wolseley Six Eighty (1948-1954)
- Morris Oxford MO (1948–1954)
- Wolseley 4/50 (1948-1954)
- Morris Cowley vans and pickups (1950–1956, 1956–1962)
- Morris Cowley (1954–1959)
- Morris Oxford Series II (1954–1956)
- Morris Isis (1955–1958)
- Morris Oxford Series III (1956–1959)
- Morris Oxford Farina (1959–1971)
- Morris 1100 (1962–1974) and variants
- Austin Maxi (1969–1981)
- Morris Marina (1971–80)
- 18–22 series/Princess (1975–1981)
- Morris Ital (1980–1982)
- Triumph Acclaim (1981–1984)
- Austin Ambassador (1982–1984)
- Rover SD1 (1982–1986)
- Austin Maestro (1983–1994)
- Austin Montego (1984–1994)
- Rover 800-series (1986–1999)
- MG RV8 (1992-1995)
- Rover 600-series (1993–1999)
- Rover 75 (1999–2000)

Pressed Steel Fisher (car bodies only)
(pressings only)

- Rolls-Royce Silver Dawn
- Rolls-Royce Silver Cloud
- Rolls-Royce Silver Shadow
- Rolls-Royce Silver Spirit

(complete finished bodies)

- many others including bodies for Hillman, Standard-Triumph and the Range Rover Classic

Honda

- Honda Legend (1986–1988)

BMW

- Mini Hatch (2000–present)
- Cabriolet (2004–2015, 2024–present)
- Clubman (2007–2024)
- Mini Coupé and Roadster (2011–2015)
- Mini Cooper SE (2020–2024)

== Plant Oxford today ==
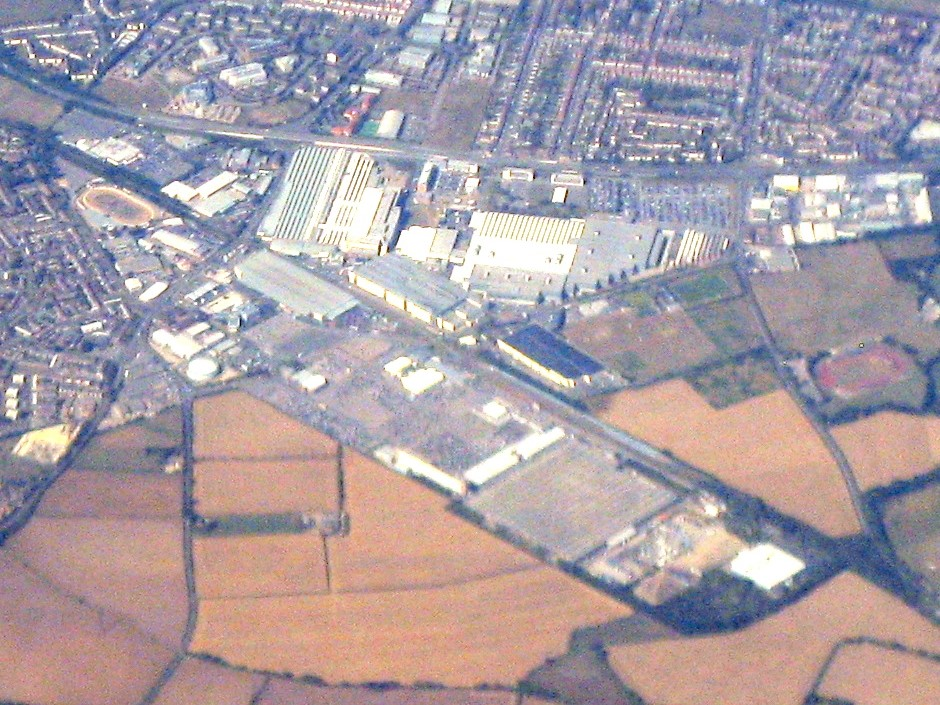
Aerial view of Plant Oxford (large white buildings)

In 2000, BMW broke up the Rover Group, selling MG Rover and its products to the Phoenix consortium for the nominal sum of £10, which included the Longbridge plant.

BMW agreed to redevelop the entire Cowley plant site with the Goodman Group, demolishing much of the factory, to create a new factory called Plant Oxford. The residual parts of the former Morris Motors site were placed into a redevelopment project called the Oxford Business Park, which now houses offices of numerous companies including: European headquarters of Harley-Davidson Motorcycles; the global headquarters of international aid charity Oxfam; Wiley-Blackwell; Royal Mail; HM Revenue and Customs; and a large David Lloyd fitness centre.

Plant Oxford now produces the new Mini, built by BMW since May 2001. It is the largest industrial employer in Oxfordshire. In February 2009, 850 jobs cuts at the site were announced, resulting in union bosses being pelted with food by angry agency staff who felt that the union had failed to do enough to try and save their jobs. Shortly thereafter, the company was forced to hire more staff to meet production requirements due to an upswing in demand overseas.

Group tours of the plant are offered and should be booked in advance.

In October 2015, a two-episode series Building Cars Live was filmed there to show how a car is built. It was presented by James May, Kate Humble and Ant Anstead.

=== Production numbers ===
In 2016, Plant Oxford produced 210,973 Minis, which represented an increase of nearly 5% over the previous year's total of 201,207.

Production volumes of all Mini models produced at Plant Oxford.

	2011	2010	2009	2008	2007	2006	2005	2004	2003	2002	2001
Production volume	191,475	216,301	213,670	235,018	237,700	186,674	200,119	189,492	174,366	160,000	
Staff numbers	3,448	3,795		4,471	5,253	4,922				6,108	4,930

Staff numbers shown here include "temporary" staff.

These figures exclude production numbers of the Mini Countryman, which was manufactured in Austria. Since 2014 Mini "hatch" 3-door and "convertible" models have also been assembled, under contract, by VDL Nedcar in the Netherlands, joined, at the end of 2016, by the Countryman model, its production now transferred from Austria in anticipation of the launch of a "plug-in hybrid" version.
