= Morris Oxford Six =

Touring car manufactured by Morris Motors Ltd.

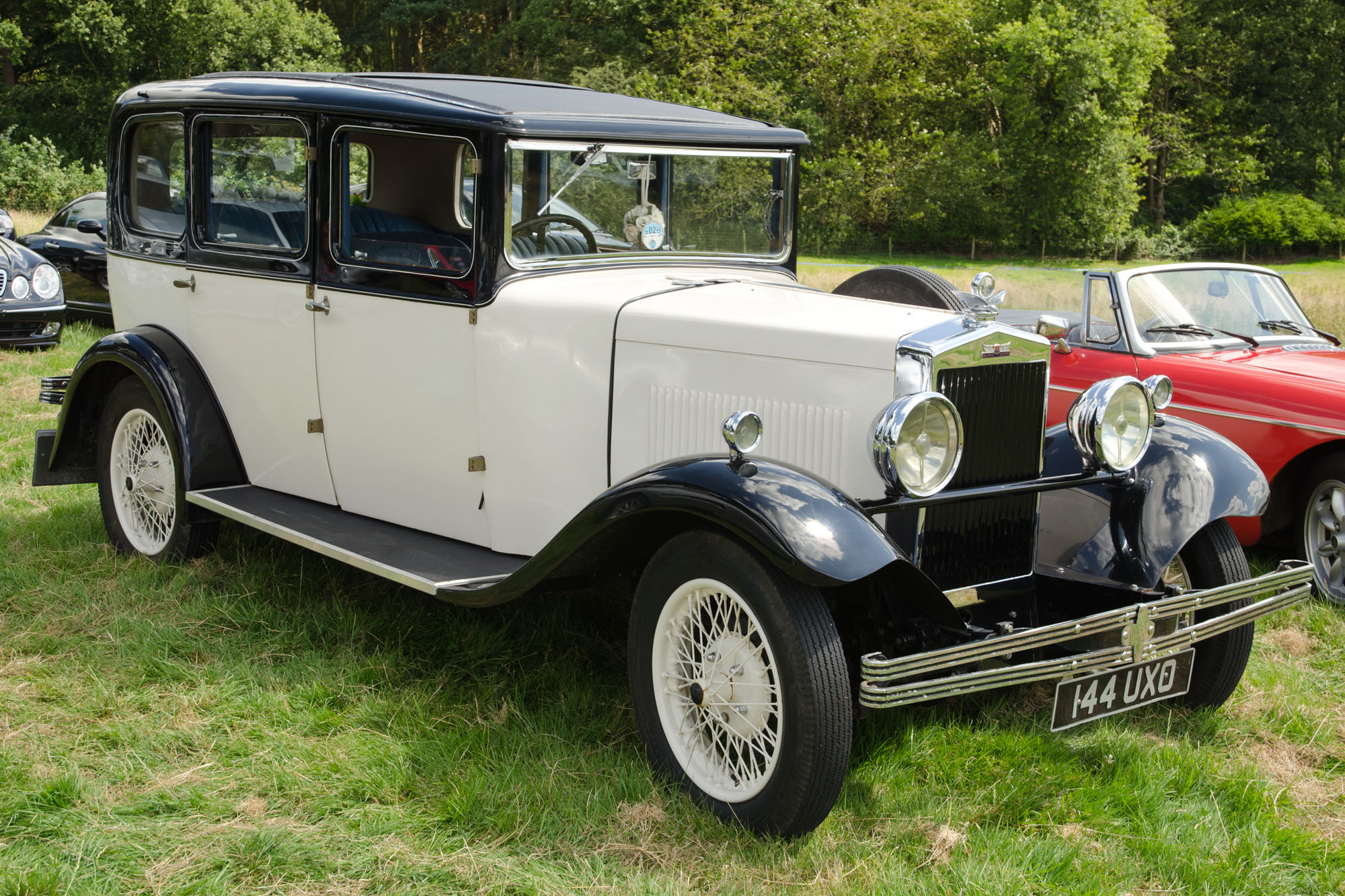
- Oxford Six Saloon 1930

Overview
- Manufacturer: Morris Motors
- Production: 1921–1926; 1929–1935

Body and chassis
- Class: Small car

The Morris Oxford Six is a motor car produced by Morris of the United Kingdom from 1921 until 1926, and again from 1929 until 1935. Initially produced as a straight-six engined version of the Morris Oxford bullnose, the original Oxford Six was the first car produced by Morris with a six-cylinder engine, but proved to be unreliable. The versions produced from 1929 onwards were introduced as a replacement for the Morris Oxford 16/40.

== Oxford Six F-type bullnose (1921–1926) ==
Oxford F-Type Six
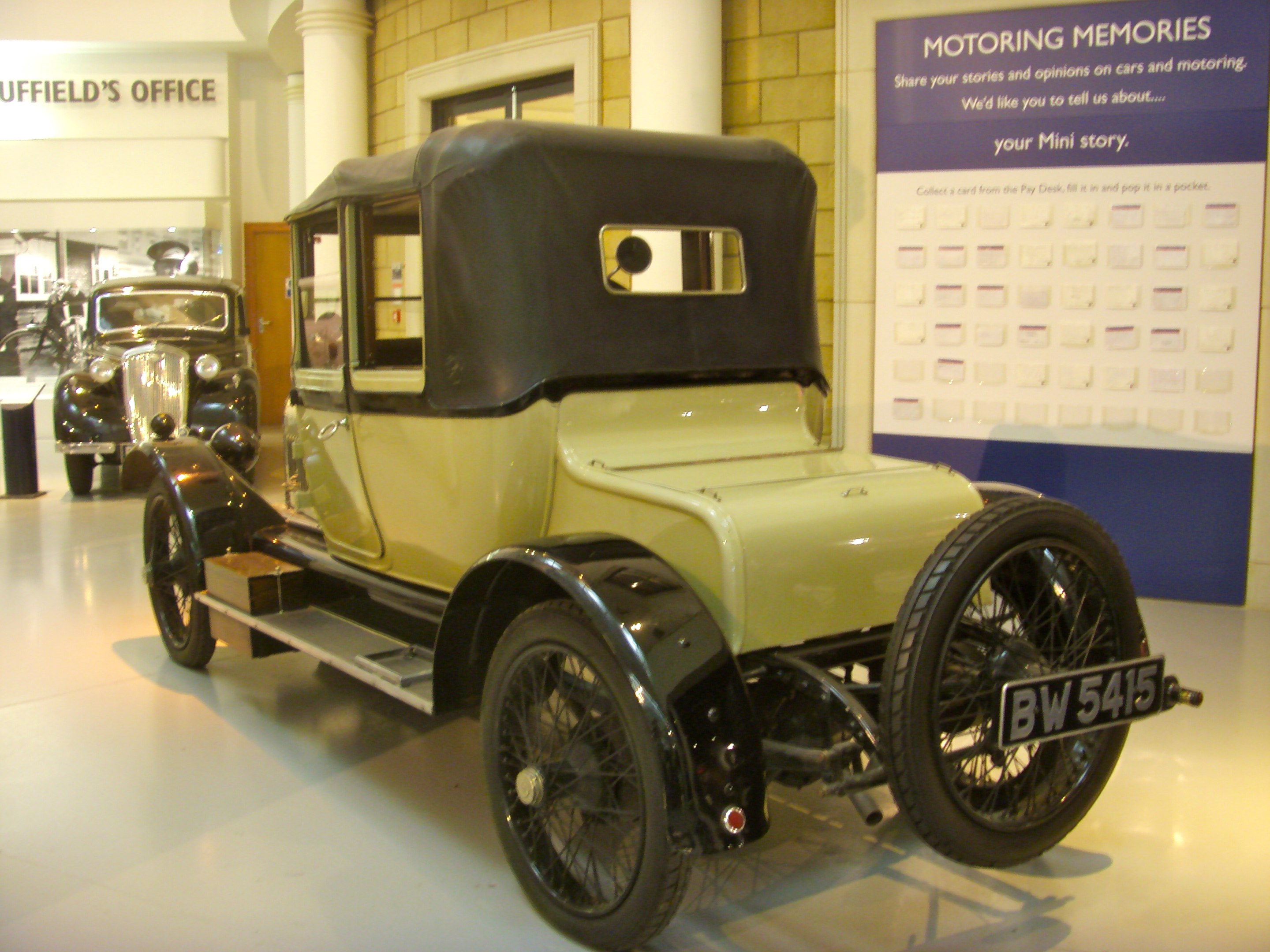
- William Morris's personal Oxford Silent Six

Overview
- Production: 1921–1926

Body and chassis
- Body style: 2-seater tourer 4-seater tourer cabriolet saloon
- Related: Morris Oxford bullnose Morris Cowley

Powertrain
- Engine: 69.5 x 102mm 2,322 cc (141.7 cu in) 17.97 hp side-valve I6

Dimensions
- Wheelbase: 111 in (2,819 mm)
- Length: 156 in (3,962 mm)

Chronology
- Successor: Oxford Six

A short-lived 17 hp six-cylinder variant, the F-Type Oxford Six, was displayed for the first time as a four seated cabriolet at the November 1922 Olympia Motor Show.

The first open four-seater tourer was sold to Lord Redesdale. Only 50 were made and, after the initial run, they were assembled to special order. It remained available until 1926.

The 2320 cc engine, it had six pistons from the 11.9, 1548 cc engine, proved unreliable, two intense vibration periods weakened and broke crankshafts and few were sold.

Although the car was longer than the four cylinder Oxford by 9 inches (230 mm) all the extra space was given over to the engine.

Oxford Six F-type bullnose	1921	1922	1923	1924	1925	1926	Total
Production	1	1	14	30	3	1	50

== Oxford Six (1929–1934) ==
Oxford Six
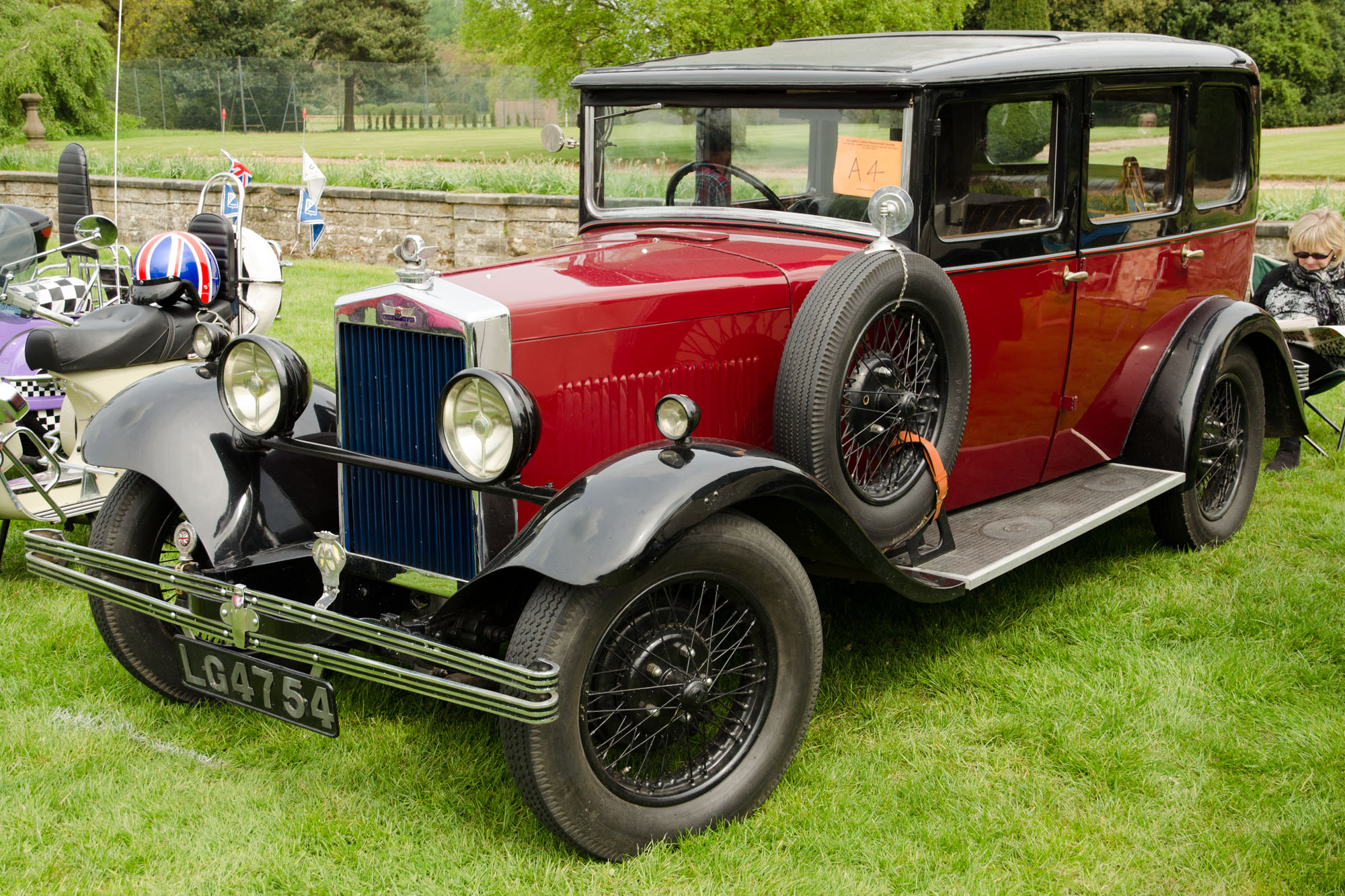
- Oxford Six six-light saloon 1930

Overview
- Production: 1929–1932

Body and chassis
- Body style: 4/5 seater tourer 4-door saloon with sliding head 4-door fabric saloon coupé with sliding head
- Related: Morris Fifteen Six

Powertrain
- Engine: 1,938 cc (118.3 cu in) I6; 2,062 cc (125.8 cu in) I6

Chronology
- Predecessor: Morris Oxford flatnose

For other contemporaneous cars loosely named Morris Six see Morris Ten, Morris Major (1931 to 1933), Morris Fourteen Six, Morris Cowley, Morris Fifteen Six Morris Six (1928), Morris Six MS, Morris Isis, Morris Twenty-one Six, Morris Twenty Five Six

A 1938 cc six-cylinder version, the LA series Oxford Six, was made between 1929 and 1933. It was much more successful than the 1921 version. Alongside the tourer and the new all-steel saloon, a fabric-bodied car was offered until 1932, when it and the tourer were dropped and a coupé introduced.

The all-steel body was made over the road at Cowley by W R Morris's joint venture with American Edward G Budd, Pressed Steel Company. It had striking similarities to a recent Dodge body. By 1930 supply problems were such that it was replaced by a similar but coachbuilt (wood framed) body.

=== Road Test ===
The Times tested the fabric bodied version of the new car. The driver has been given an electrical petrol gauge. Standard fitments include: bumpers, a stoplight and dipping headlights pneumatically controlled from the steering wheel. The four-wheel brakes are Lockheed hydraulic. The rear brakes by hand were found to be "useful" and the pedal brakes "admirable". Tools are supplied in a locker under the near side running board. The battery can be got at through a trap under the driver's seat. At the rear there is a fair-sized lockable luggage compartment. "The minimum brake horsepower is stated to be 45 at 3,200 rpm." Frame members are straight and at bumper height so that any shock is better withstood.

The Times went on to describe the new car as well-proportioned with seating front and back "thoroughly comfortable". The highest speed was about 60 miles an hour in top gear. Clutch action was satisfactory.

Chassis alone £215, this fabric saloon £285, tourer £275, coupé £295, coach built saloon £299.

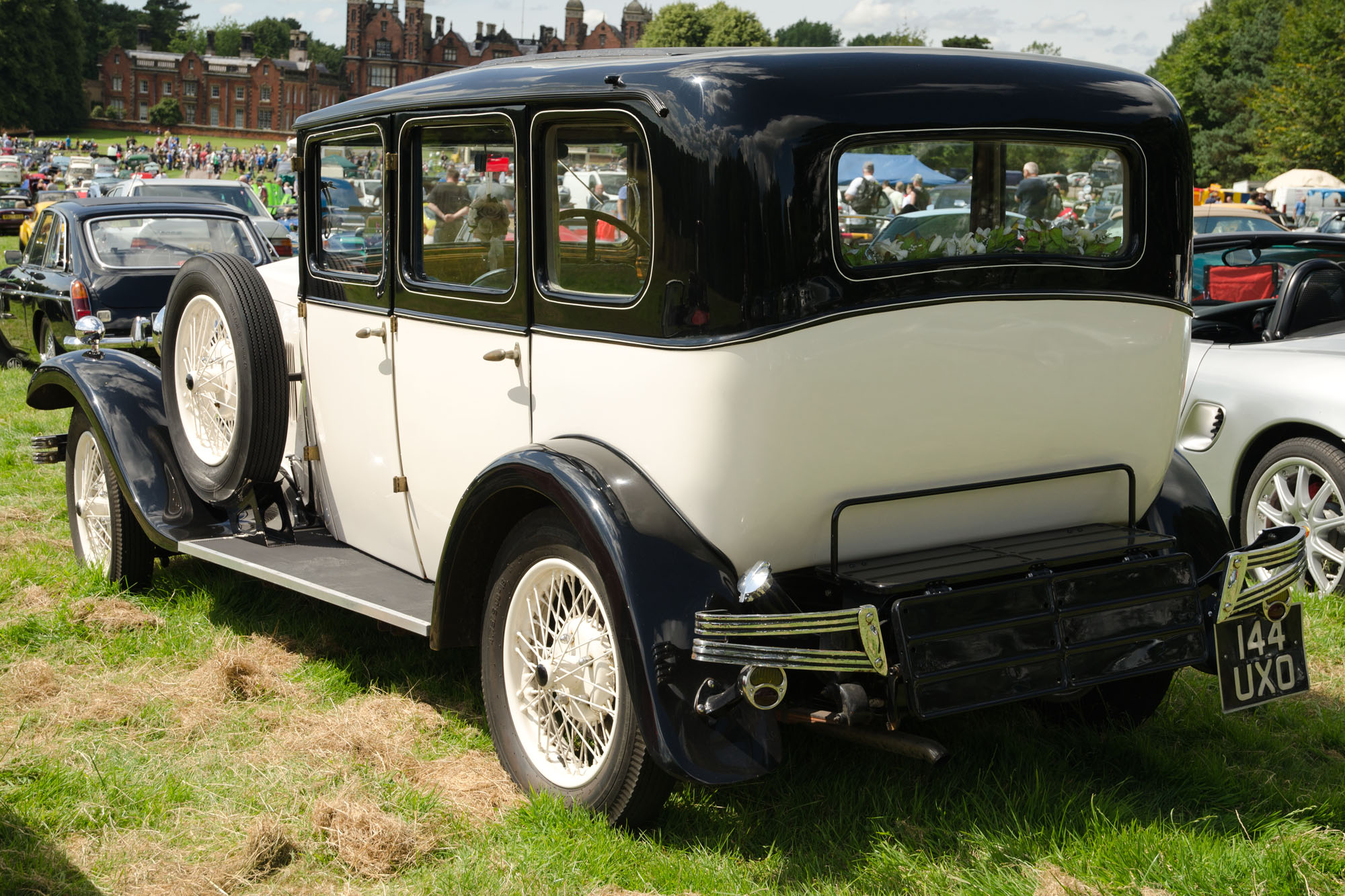
Oxford Six saloon
registered April 1930

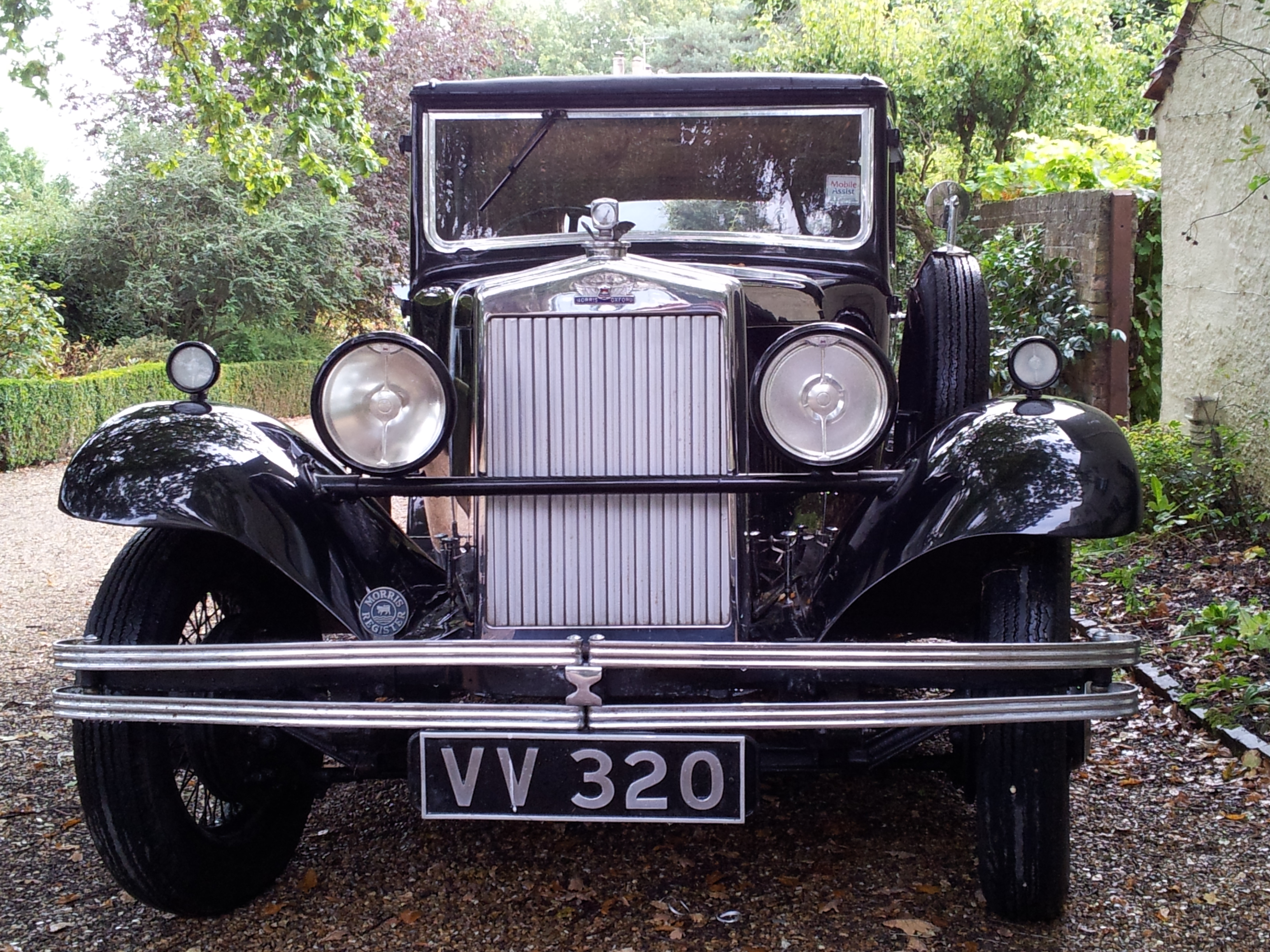
Oxford Six saloon
registered December 1930

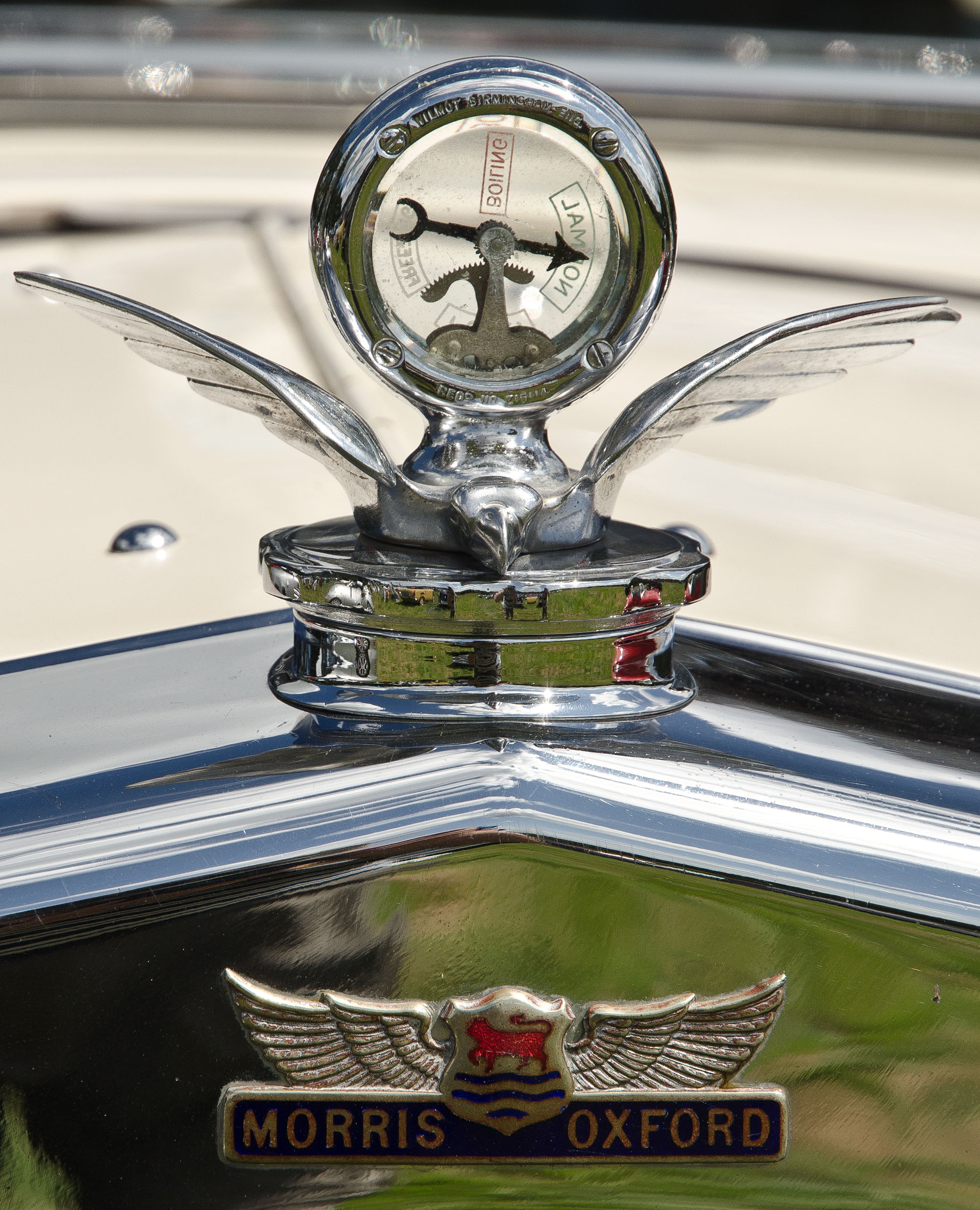

In August 1930 a shorter chassis more expensive version was announced and named Morris Major Six, "A new light six-cylinder 15 hp model with a sparkling road performance". The Isis Six matched the Oxford SIx but was given "luxurious bodywork" and a larger 2½-litre engine.

=== Upgrade ===
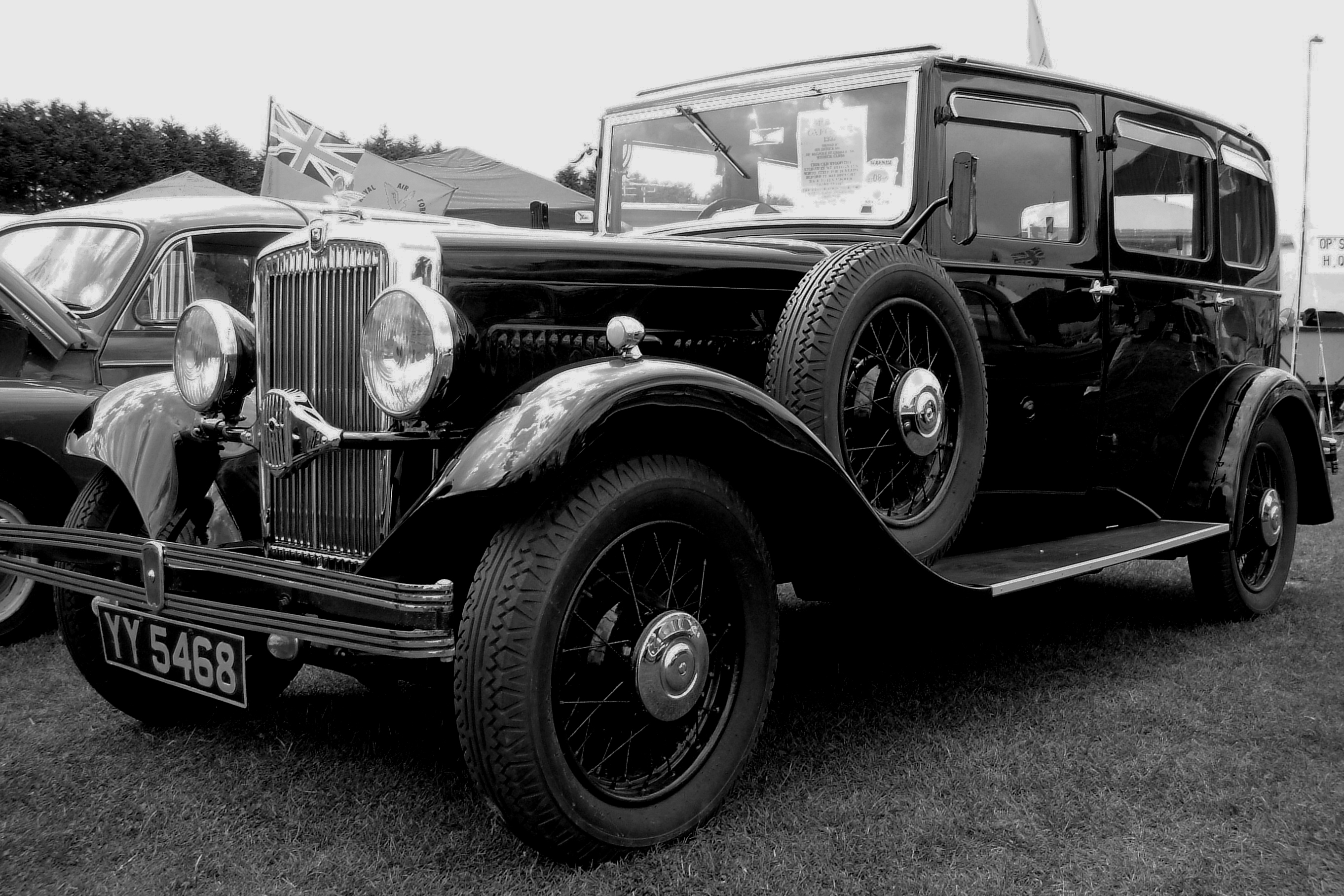
Oxford Six 6-light saloon Q-series registered December 1932 direction indicator on bracket above spare

In September 1932, the gearbox gained a fourth speed and the engine grew to 2062 cc with the Q-series unit. All Morris cars were given anti-splash side-shields to their front wings.

Direction indicators, a set of three coloured lights on each side of the car visible from front and rear were fitted. Controlled from a switch on the dashboard they permitted accurate indications of planned movements while the car's windows remain shut.

In its road test The Times commented favourably on the direction indicators though it noted the lack of ashtrays. Further comments of interest: starter access, should the starter lock, was considered difficult. The car moved with a mechanical smoothness and quietness "not always found with a car of this price". The saloon cornered unusually well. The pedal brakes were excellent but for a slight pull to the offside.

=== Automatism ===
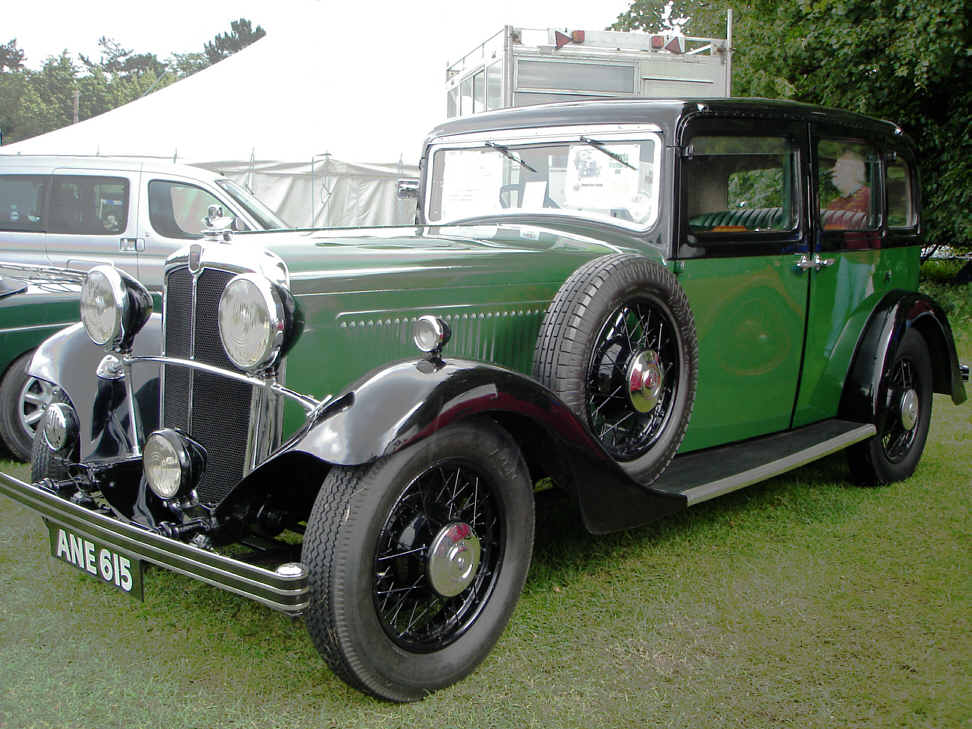
Oxford Six six-light saloon registered April 1934

All Morris cars for 1934, this was announced in August 1933, were to have 4-speed synchromesh gearboxes, dipping headlights, hydraulic shock absorbers, hydraulic brakes, rear petrol tank, direction indicators, safety glass and automatic ignition.

The Oxford, Isis and Twenty-five were singled out and given "automatic clutch control" described by The Times as automatism. The Oxford also received a governable free-wheel, bigger seats, a spare wheel cover and concealed ashtrays for back seat passengers.

The chassis frame was quite new and now also contained a cruciform shape. It was longer as well as stronger with flexible mounting for the (continued) 2062 cc engine. New shaped coachwork incorporated improved running boards, a new pattern of brake lever, draught excluders over the slots for the pedals and gear lever and interior sun visors, twin rear and reversing lights, fog light, occasional table folded behind the front seats, new pattern armrests are place front and rear and a folding footrest provided for rear seat passengers.

Reporting again in March 1934 The Times drew attention to the gearbox's free-wheel, quiet-third and synchromesh on the three top speeds. "Automatic clutch control" eliminated use of the clutch even for starting or stopping. Automatic engine restarting was fitted. The steering wheel was too large though distracting rather than obstructive. The handbrake lever was awkwardly shaped and positioned. The car remained smooth and quiet.

=== Tax relief ===
This Oxford Six was renamed Oxford Sixteen in September 1934 and placed within the new 16 to 25 horsepower range of Morris Big Sixes expanded in view of the 25 per cent reduction in Horse Power tax expected in 1935.

== Oxford Sixteen and Oxford Twenty (1934–1935) ==
Oxford Sixteen and Twenty
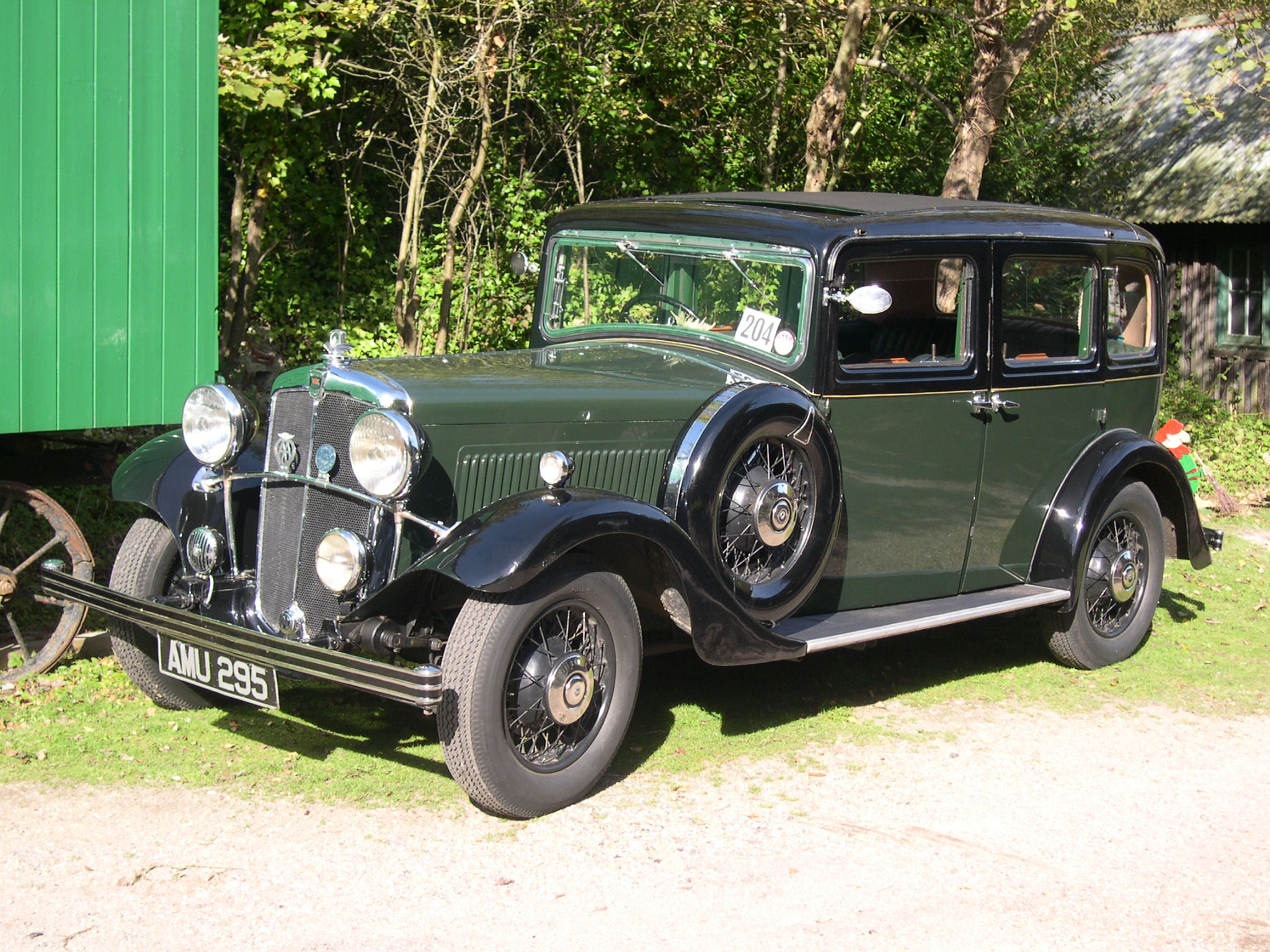
- Oxford Sixteen six-light saloon 1935 registered January 1935 with freewheel and Bendix automatic clutch

Overview
- Production: 1934–1935; 6308 made

Body and chassis
- Body style: 4-door saloon 4-door coupé
- Related: Isis, Cowley

Powertrain
- Engine: 2,062 cc (125.8 cu in) I6; 2,561 cc (156.3 cu in) I6

Dimensions
- Wheelbase: 114 in (2,896 mm)

Chronology
- Successor: Morris Big Six

The Six name was changed to Sixteen, from the car's 16 hp tax horsepower category, in September 1934 when its 2062 cc engine was joined by the 2561 cc Twenty sold for the same price, the size of engine being the only difference. There was an intermediate eighteen horsepower Isis. Outwards appearance was further improved, the free-wheel and automatic clutch by Bendix remained in the specification. The hydraulic shock absorbers were now made by Luvax and double-acting. Wheels continued to be by Magna.

The engine's cooling system now had thermostatic control, mixture control was now thermostatic, direction indicators self-cancelling, the electric windscreen wiper was fitted with a blade for each side of the screen, Triplex safety glass fitted throughout.

Two styles of coachwork were available, the saloon and a Special coupé both fitted with a Pytchley sliding head (sunroof) and the sliding head is wired for radio. The interior woodwork is burr walnut, matt-finished in the saloon.

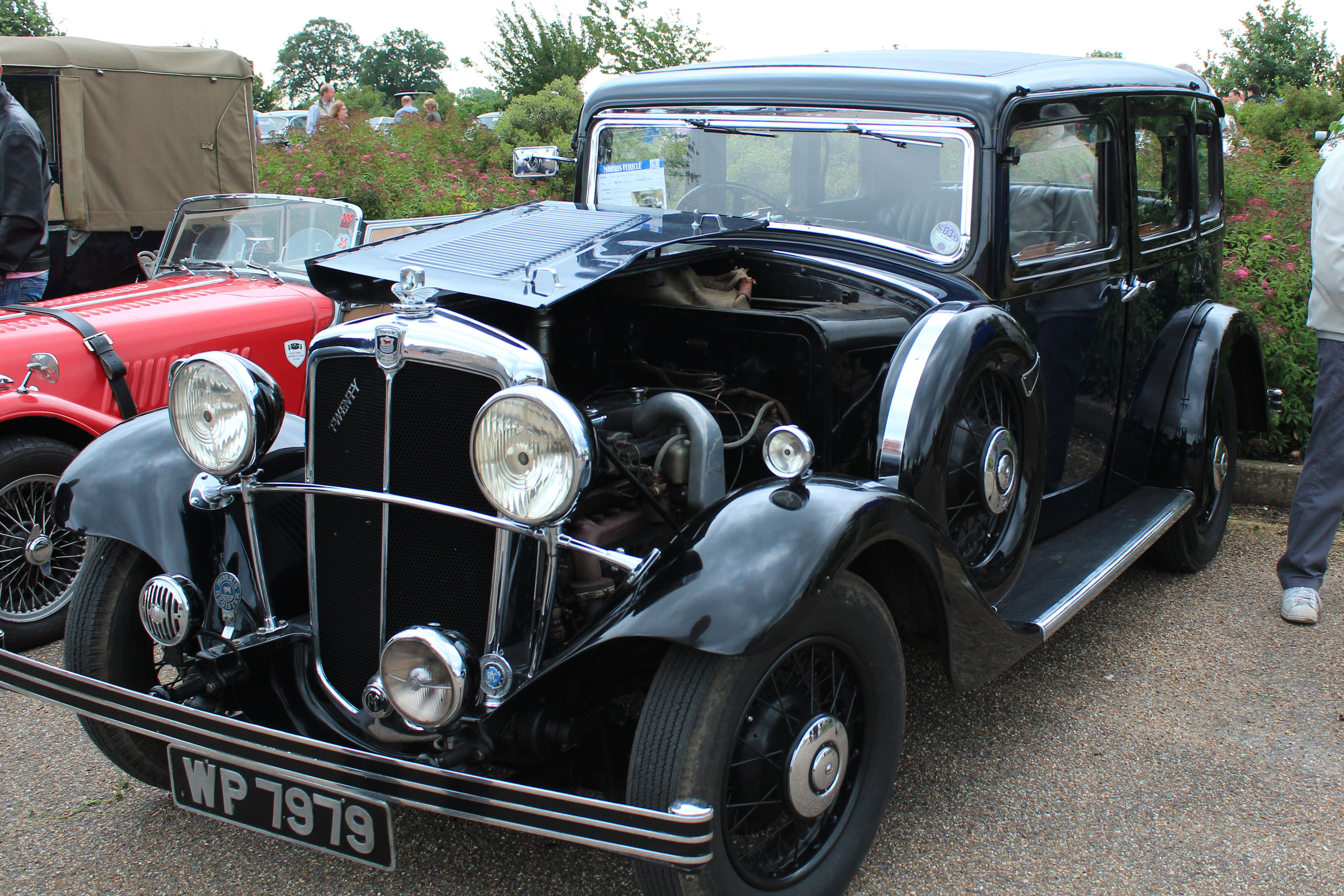
Oxford Twenty six-light saloon 1935

Barely nine months later these cars were superseded by members of the Morris Big Six series II range: Sixteen (later Eighteen) and Twenty-one (later Twenty-Five), announced 2 July 1935.

The Oxford name disappeared from new Morris cars until 1948.
