= Morris Six (1928) =

Morris Six 17.7
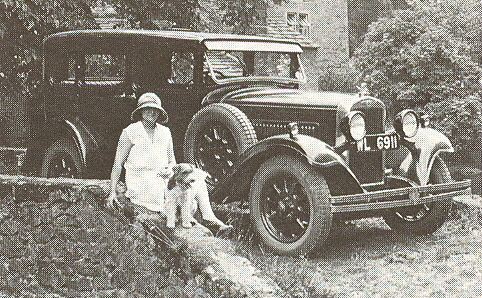
- Six saloon 1929

Overview
- Manufacturer: Morris Motors Limited
- Production: 1927–1929
- Model years: 1928–1929

Body and chassis
- Body style: saloon; coupé; Club Coupé by Gordon England
- Layout: front engine rear wheel drive
- Related: Morris Oxford Six, Morris Isis

Powertrain
- Engine: 2,468 cc (151 cu in); OHV SOHC Straight-6 engine clutch and 3-speed gearbox are one unit held through rubber to the frame.
- Transmission: The clutch runs in oil and has cork inserts. Drive is taken to the back axle through an enclosed propeller shaft to the spiral bevel final drive

Dimensions
- Wheelbase: 9' 6" 114 in (2,895.6 mm) (lt 6); 9' 9" 117 in (2,971.8 mm); track: 4' 0" 48 in (1,219.2 mm) (lt 6); 4' 8" 56 in (1,422.4 mm)
- Length: 14' 9" 177 in (4,495.8 mm)
- Width: 5' 9¼" 69.25 in (1,758.9 mm)
- Height: not supplied
- Kerb weight: 2,016 lb (914 kg)

Chronology
- Predecessor: none
- Successor: Morris Isis

Morris JA

Layout
- Configuration: inline 6-cylinders with overhead valves and single overhead camshaft
- Displacement: 2,468 cc (151 cu in)
- Cylinder bore: 69 mm (2.7 in)
- Piston stroke: 110 mm (4.3 in)
- Cylinder block material: cast integral with upper crankcase crankshaft: has 4 main bearings pistons: aluminium connecting rods: steel
- Cylinder head material: detachable
- Valvetrain: single overhead camshaft, inclined overhead valves, timing adjustment in the camshaft's automatically tensioned double roller chain drive

Combustion
- Fuel type: petrol Carburettor: S.U. fed by Autovac tank on the dash, main tank at back of car has a gauge mounted on it
- Oil system: forced throughout engine
- Cooling system: water with pump through honeycomb radiator with extension tank

Output
- Power output: 52 bhp @3,200 rpm; tax horsepower 17.71

Chronology
- Predecessor: none
- Successor: Morris Isis

The Morris Six is a 2½-litre six-cylinder car with an overhead camshaft for its overhead valves first displayed at the October 1927 Motor Show at Olympia as Morris Light Six. When he bought Wolseley in February 1927 W R Morris gave Wolseley employees his reason. It was that he wanted to make good 6-cylinder cars and Wolseley could do that. He said he particularly admired their 2-litre Wolseley 16/45.

The Morris Light Six was the first car to use the all steel body made by Pressed Steel at Cowley but on the road it proved too unstable to enter full production. Revised and given a wider track and longer wheelbase it was named Morris Six.

It was replaced in the Morris catalogue by Morris Isis which was announced in July 1929 and had a new chassis for the engine.

== Engine ==
The six-cylinder 2½-litre engine has inclined overhead valves on either side of the cylinder head. They are opened by rockers operated by a single overhead camshaft which is driven by double roller chain. The S.U. carburettor is bolted to the cylinder head which may be removed with the valve train without affecting engine timing. The crankshaft has been given four bearings. The pistons are of aluminium and the connecting rods are steel. Cooling water circulates by pump.

== Body ==
There is a four-door six-light saloon body or a two-door coupé with a dome head, occasional seats in the interior and a dickey seat behind. Both cars have bucket front seats that are adjustable. In early 1929 these bodies were joined by a Club Coupé by Gordon England. The Club Coupé cost ten percent more than the ordinary coupé but it included wire wheels and reinforced (Triplex) glass.

Both saloon and coupé were given leather upholstery. From June 1928 for an extra £15 the saloon could be supplied with Triplex windscreen and windows, the same for the coupé was £12.10.0. For a further charge of £10 both cars were available with wire wheels in place of the standard steel artillery wheels.

For 1929 bumpers were standardised on all Morris cars as were dipping headlights, electric horns and vibrationless engine mountings. The same issue reported a drop in the price of the Morris Six from £410 to £390. Morris Cowley prices went up but this was for improved coachwork.

Equipment includes such accessories as:

- winding windows
- coil indicator light
- extra large dipping headlamps
- festoon light (sic)
- roof lamp
- electric screenwiper,
- electric and bulb horns
- exterior and interior driving mirrors
- smoker's cabinet
- dash ventilator
- petrol gauge
- radiator thermometer
- double bumpers
- locks on all doors
- duotone cellulose finish

== Brakes suspension steering ==
There are six brakes all worked by cable. The four-wheel brakes share a common cable at each side and some compensation is provided between front and back brakes on each side. Drums are enclosed and ribbed. There is a hand-operated primary adjuster under the bonnet for the brakes on each wheel and by spanner at the end of the cable at each brake. The forward brakes operate on the Rubury principle. Steering is by worm and wheel. Suspension is by half elliptic springs fitted with shock absorbers. Gaiters are fitted back and front. Back springs are underhung, forward springs are flat set and splayed.

== Test ==
The Motoring Correspondent of The Times wrote that when on trial there was no sign of overheating. Seven bearings for the crankshaft might improve the engine's smoothness but, without sudden opening of the throttle, it is smooth and silky. Clutch worked well, change-speed was light and easy. Brakes worked well and all seats were comfortable for passengers as well as driver.

This car with its 2½-litre 6-cylinder engine and three speed gearbox, the correspondent said, should meet the requirements of many who might otherwise buy an American car. Gear changing was as simple as on any American car.
