= Morris Oxford Empire models =

Morris Oxford

Overview
- Manufacturer: Morris Motors Limited
- Production: 1913-1914; 1919–1935; 1948-1971

Body and chassis
- Class: Small family car

Morris Oxford is a series of motor car models produced by Morris Motors of the United Kingdom, from the 1913 bullnose Oxford to the Farina Oxfords V and VI.

Named by W R Morris after the city of dreaming spires, the university town in which he grew up, the manufacture of Morris's Oxford cars would turn Oxford into an industrial city.

From 1913 to mid-1935 Oxford cars grew in size and quantity. In 1923 they with the Cowley cars were 28.1 per cent of British private car production. In 1925 Morris sold near double the number and they represented 41 per cent of British production. The model name was recycled in 1948 and lasted almost another 23 years through to 1971 but in this time the market sector and engine-size remained nearly constant between 1476 cc and 1622 cc.

Aside from the Oxford Sixes and these Oxford Empire models all Oxfords since 1918 have been 12 or 14 HP cars of about 1500 to 1800 cc..

== Oxford 15.9 ==
Oxford 15.9
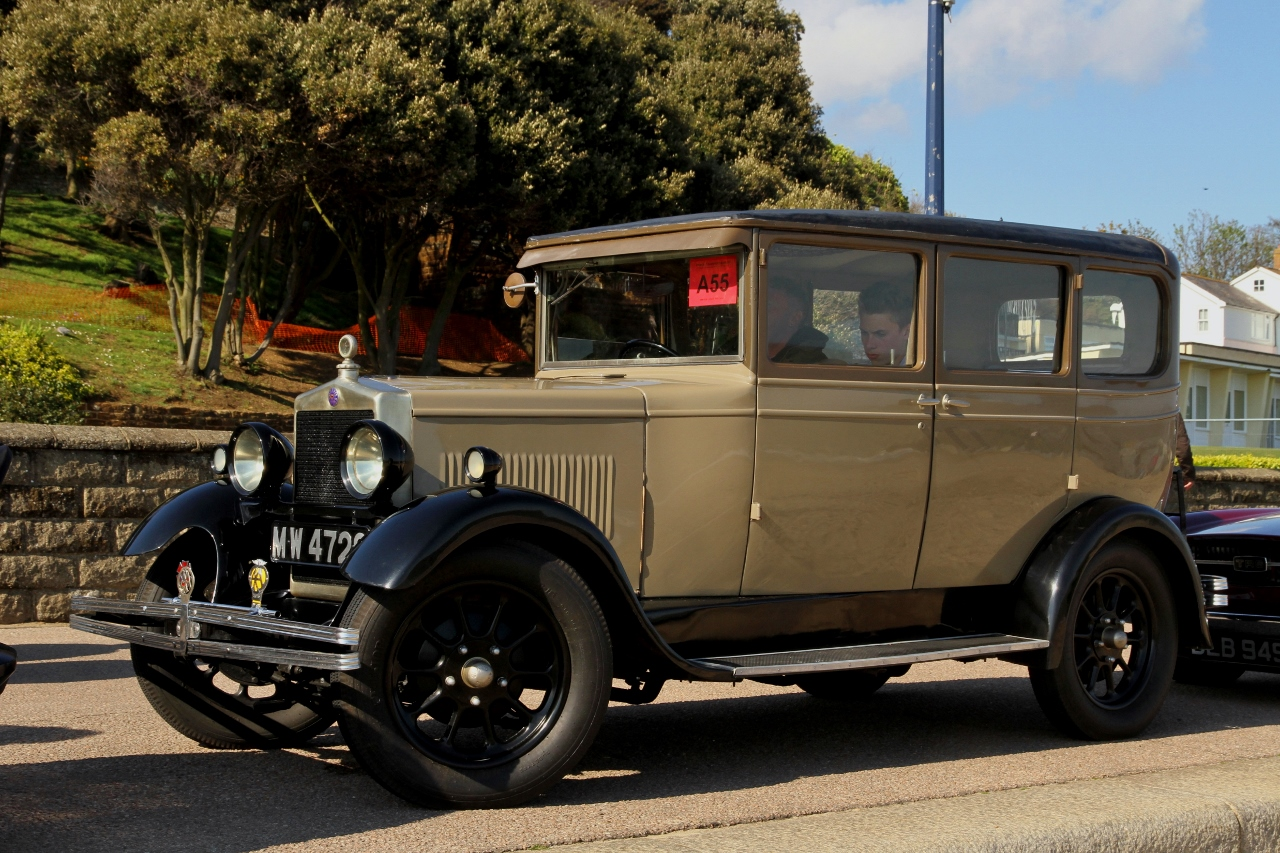
- saloon first registered May 1929

Overview
- Manufacturer: Morris Motors Limited
- Production: 1926-29

Body and chassis
- Body style: 4-door tourer; 4-door saloon; chassis only

Powertrain
- Engine: 2513 cc side-valve Straight-4 mounted in unit with clutch and gearbox at three points to the chassis frame
- Transmission: clutch: single-plate, gearbox: 4-speed, universal metal joint to propeller shaft in torque tube, final drive by overhead worm to three-quarter floating axle.

Dimensions
- Wheelbase: 114 in (2,900 mm): track 56 in (1,400 mm)
- Length: 161 in (4,089.4 mm)*
- Width: 48 in (1,219.2 mm)*
- Height: 73 in (1,854.2 mm)* * = "shipping dimensions"
- Kerb weight: 2,912 lb (1,321 kg) tourer

Chronology
- Predecessor: none
- Successor: Oxford 16/40

Engine Oxford 15.9

Overview
- Manufacturer: Morris Engines Limited

Layout
- Configuration: straight-4 cast en bloc with upper crankcase
- Displacement: 2.513 L (153.4 cu in)
- Cylinder bore: 80 mm (3.1 in)
- Piston stroke: 125 mm (4.9 in)
- Cylinder block material: cast-iron 3-bearing crankshaft pistons: aluminium alloy crankshaft: three bearings connecting rods: duralumin
- Cylinder head material: cast-iron detachable
- Valvetrain: side by side valves, camshaft (with dynamo and magneto) driven by spiral gearing from crankshaft

Combustion
- Fuel system: Smith carburettor, scuttle tank filled from rear by Autovac
- Fuel type: petrol
- Oil system: forced feed throughout
- Cooling system: water, impeller for circulation assisted by 4-blade fan honeycomb radiator

Output
- Power output: not published: tax rating 15.87hp

The 2½-litre Oxford 15.9 Empire model was displayed as "a Colonial Chassis" at the Olympia Motor Show of October 1926. A complete car was on display at nearby main dealers.

The standard coachwork is a four or five seater body with four doors. The driving seat, the rake of the steering, the positioning of the clutch and brake pedals are all adjustable. Gears are controlled by a central flexible lever operating in a visible gate and there is a catch for reverse.

=== Brakes suspension steering ===
Steering is carried out through a worm and complete wheel in a box screwed to the frame. New gear positions are available at a low price. The brake pedal operates internally expanding brakes on all four wheels, the handbrake operates at the back using separate shoes. The brake drums are enclosed. Standard fittings include a spare (steel artillery) wheel and tyre. Shock absorbers are provided. There are semi-elliptic springs all round, flat set at the front. The rear springs are underhung. Cross-braced by three direct members the chassis channel-section side members are narrowed at the front and rise over the back axle

=== Empire size ground-clearance ===
The car can be driven safely through 20 inches, 510 mm, of water. The ground clearance is 10¼ inches, 260 mm. A full 11 inches, 278 mm, is allowed at the forward running board bracket cross stay. This clearance is now greater than on many American cars. This "falsifies hostile propaganda to the contrary".

Equipment includes dipping headlamps for use during fog and to prevent dazzle of other motorists controlled by a lever on the right of the driver.

The motoring correspondent of The Times reported as follows. The car is well finished for £375. For export the finish might be cheaper with less nickel inside. There were draughts at the bottom of the rear doors. The brakes were effective but might respond more quickly. The change-speed was delightful to handle and there could be no complaints about the clutch action. The comfortable maximum is about 55 mph.

The chassis alone costs £245, the five-seated tourer £325.

The following summer this price was dropped £20. No change was made to Morris's catalogue of the 15.9 for the October 1927 Motor Show Morris's 17.7 hp Light Six was first shown at this 1927 Show.

This Oxford 15.9 was replaced by another four cylinder Oxford, Oxford 16/40.

15.9 and 16/40	1926	1927	1928	1929
cars produced	1	1168	431	142

The website of the International Alliance of Morris owners explains that this car was designed by Morris-Commercial, the part of Morris's empire that made commercial vehicles and their engines and Morris gearboxes and back axles. This 15.9 hp Morris-Commercial engine was intended for a truck.

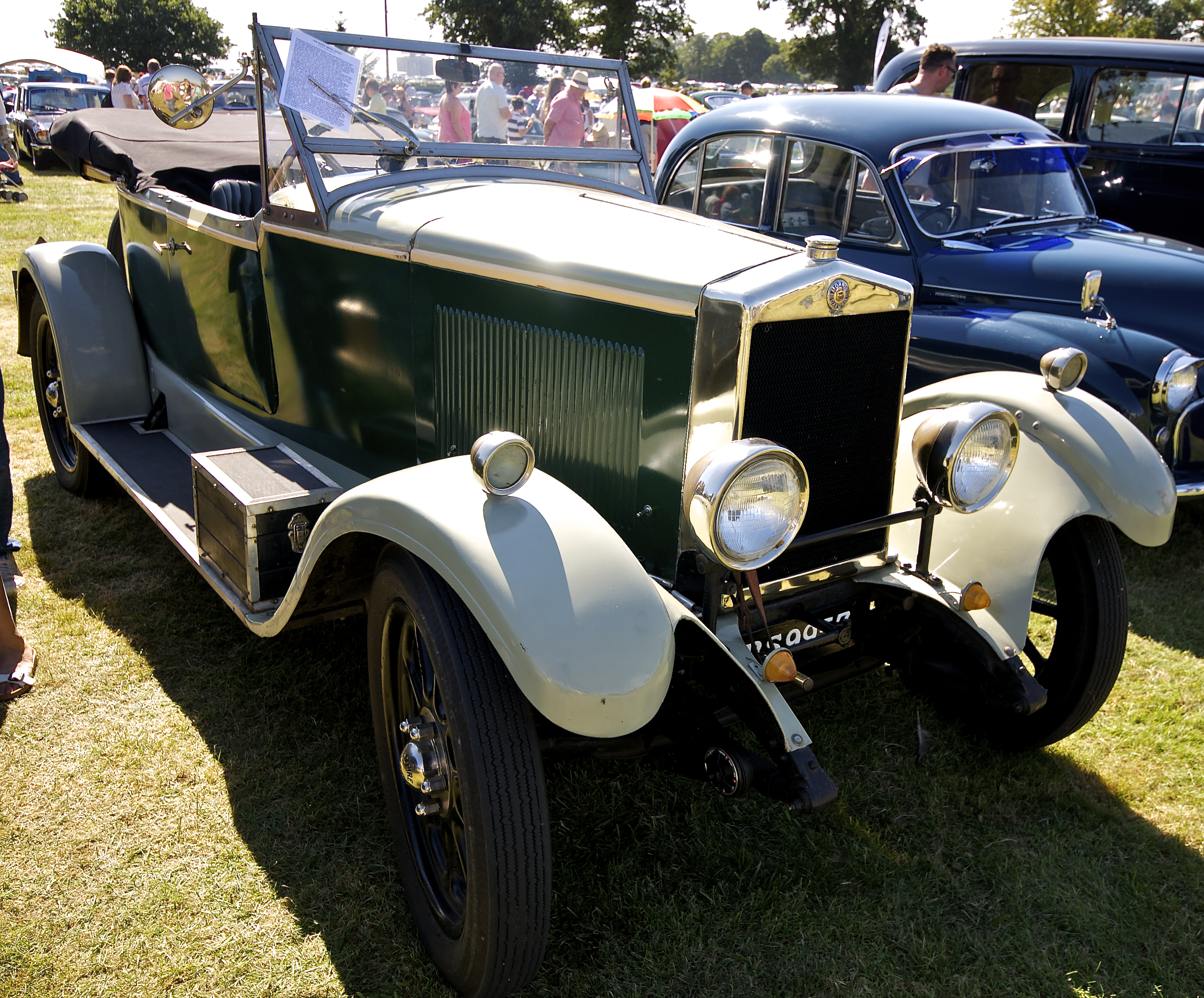
open two-seater 1928

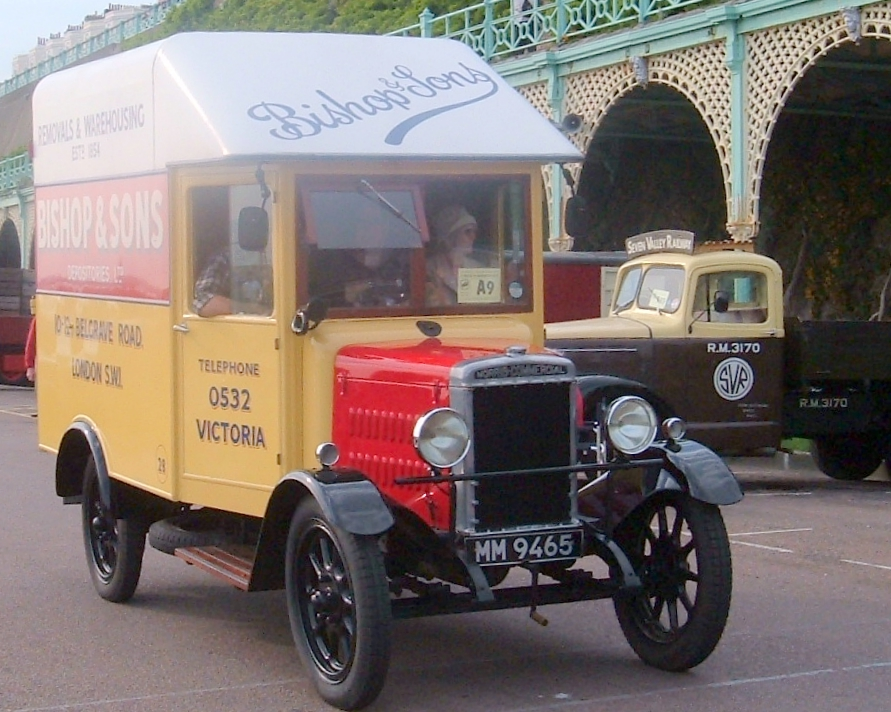
Morris Commercial 1 ton van of 1928

== Oxford 16/40 ==
Oxford 16/40

Overview
- Also called: Oxford 15.9 all details above

Chronology
- Predecessor: Oxford four 15.9
- Successor: Oxford Six

Engine Oxford 16/40

Overview
- Also called: Oxford 15.9 all details above

A new version was announced in September 1928 given a new name before the announcement of the 15.9 horsepower Oxford Six. There were minor improvements of appearance but this was no more than a 15.9 with a new name.

This 16/40 was replaced by Oxford Six 15.9 hp.
