= Morris Big Six =

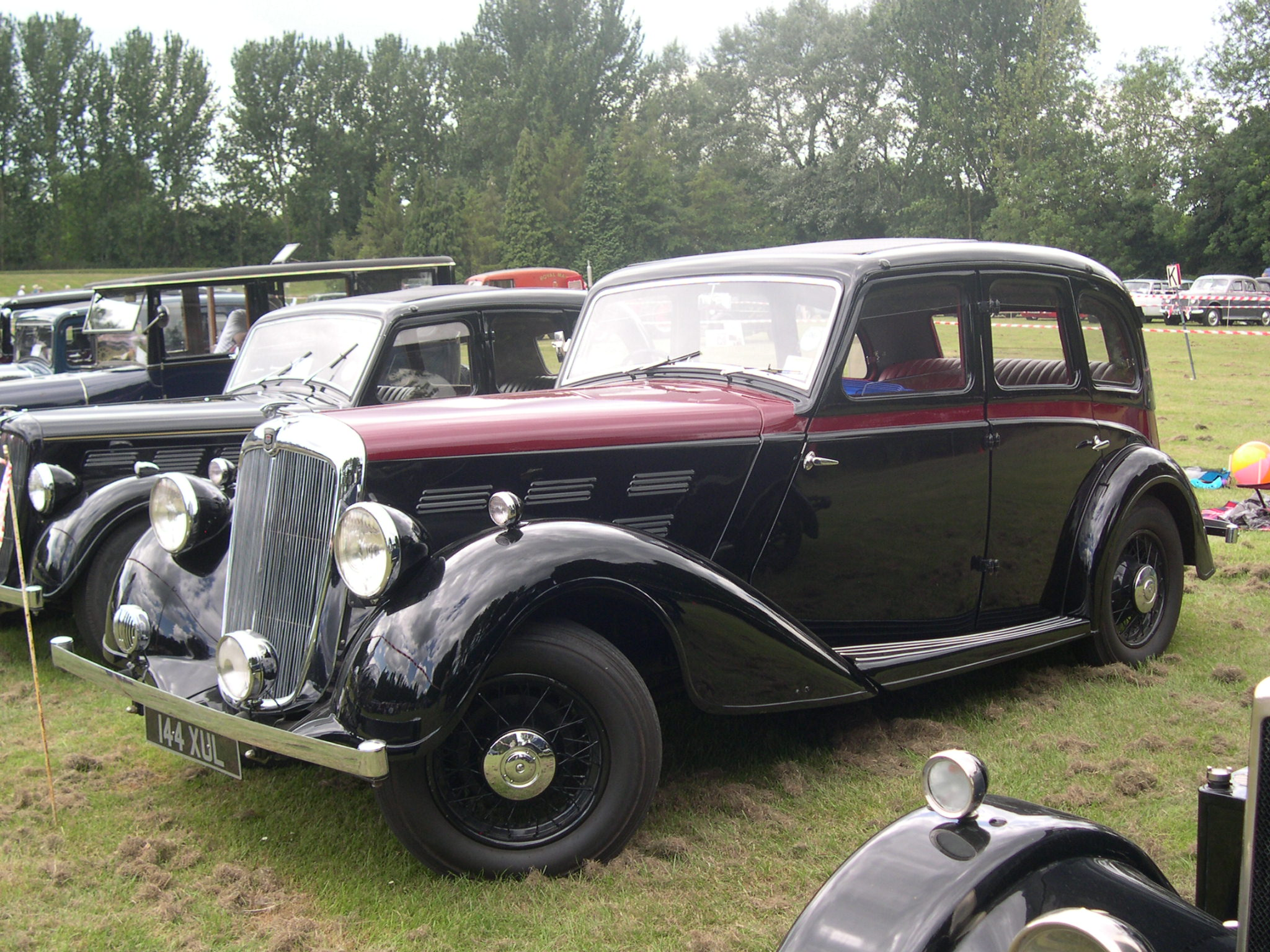
- Late 1935 Morris Twenty Five saloon

Overview
- Manufacturer: Morris Motors Limited
- Production: 1935–1939
- Assembly: United Kingdom: Oxford, England

Chronology
- Predecessor: Morris Oxford Six
- Successor: Morris Six MS

Morris Big Six is a range of motor cars that was produced by Morris of the United Kingdom from 1935 to 1939. The first models are sometimes referred to as the Big Six Series II, and the last Morris Twenty-Five, after upgrading to an overhead-valve engine, as the Big Six Series III.

They were the successors to the Morris Oxford Six range, which comprised the Morris Sixteen and Morris Twenty by the time of its cessation in 1935, and the original Morris Isis (which briefly grew into what would retrospectively be thought of as the Big Six Series I).

The largest Morris models, the Big Sixes were produced with 4-door saloon and, optionally for some models, 2-door coupé bodies.

== Models ==
The range was announced on 2 July 1935. Production of most ended in 1937, with the Twenty-Five continuing through an update in 1938, until the end of production in 1939.

All models had a single plate cork insert clutch, running in oil, with a spring hub. All had a 3-speed gearbox except some Eighteens — those that had the QSHM rather than QJ engine featured a 4-speed.

There was no direct successor during the war years. The next comparable Morris was the Morris Six MS of 1948.

=== Morris Sixteen ===
Morris Sixteen

Overview
- Manufacturer: Morris Motors Limited
- Production: 1935–1937

Body and chassis
- Body style: 4-door saloon

Powertrain
- Engine: 2.0 L Straight-6

Dimensions
- Wheelbase: 2972 mm
- Length: 4801 mm
- Width: 1778 mm
- Curb weight: 1435 kg

Available as a 4-door saloon, the Sixteen had a Morris QH engine the same size as its predecessor, at 2062cc. It achieved 15.94 hp (RAC hp). It had semi-elliptic leaf-spring suspension.

=== Morris Eighteen ===
Morris Eighteen

Overview
- Manufacturer: Morris Motors Limited
- Production: 1935–1937

Body and chassis
- Body style: 4-door saloon

Powertrain
- Engine: 2.3 L Straight-6

The Eighteen differed from the Sixteen in having a larger bore than its predecessor and a displacement of 2288cc. Engines were either QJ (with a 3-speed gearbox), or QSHM (with the only 4-speed of the Big Sixes). It made 17.7 hp (RAC hp). It could achieve a top speed of 107 km/h.

=== Morris Twenty-One ===
Morris Twenty-One

Overview
- Manufacturer: Morris Motors Limited
- Production: 1935–1937

Body and chassis
- Body style: 4-door saloon

Powertrain
- Engine: 2.9 L Straight-6

The Twenty-One, available as a 4-door saloon, had a Morris OJ engine displacing 2916cc and achieving 20.92hp (RAC hp).

=== Morris Twenty-Five ===
Morris Twenty-Five
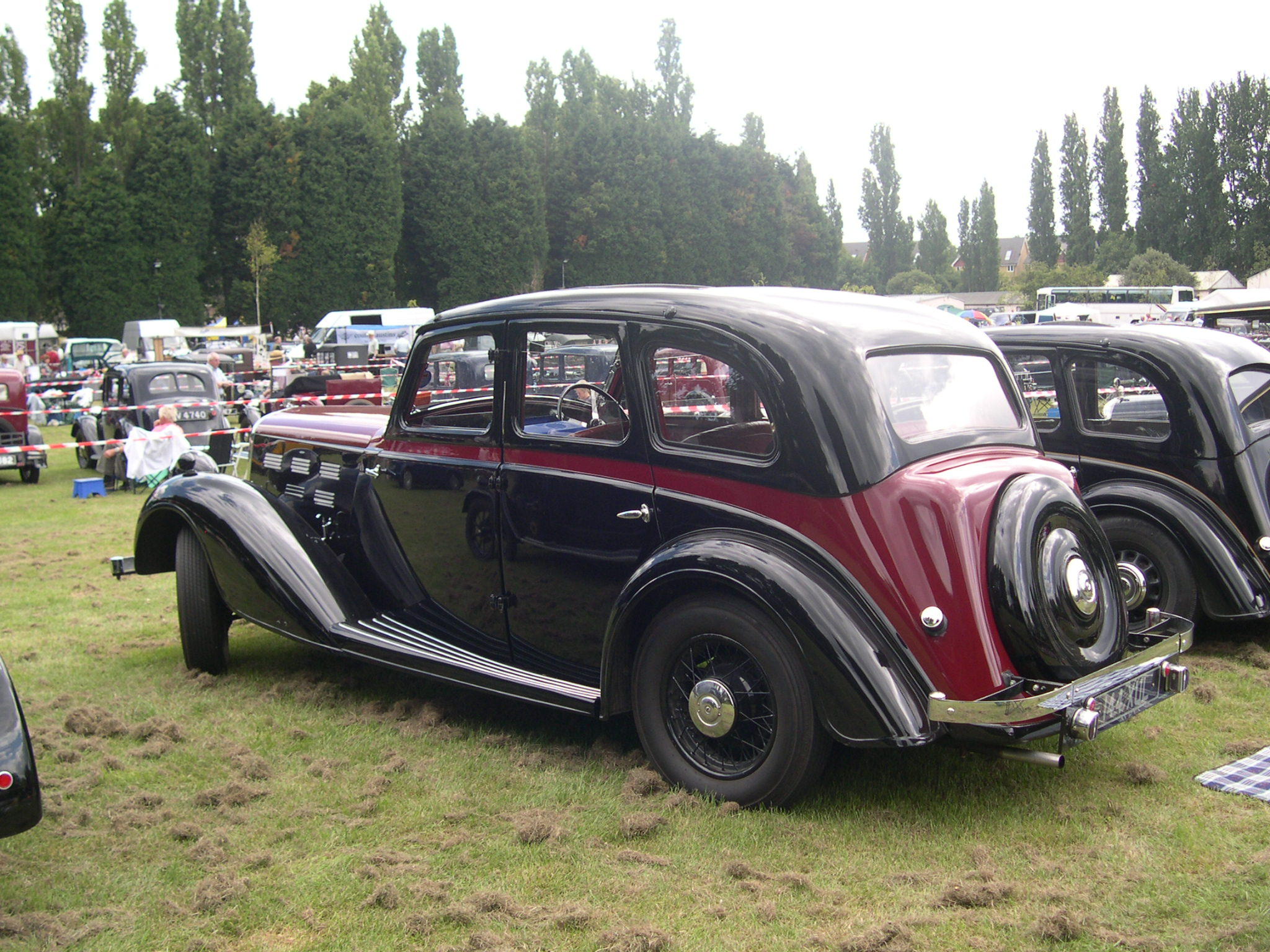
- Late 1935 Morris Twenty Five saloon

Overview
- Manufacturer: Morris Motors Limited
- Production: 1935–1939

Body and chassis
- Body style: 4-door saloon 2-door coupé

Powertrain
- Engine: 3.5 L Straight-6

Available as a 4-door saloon and a striking 2-door "Doctor's Coupé", the Twenty-Five "Series II" had a Morris OK side-valve engine displacing 3485cc, and giving 25.01 hp (RAC hp).

The Twenty-Five "Series III" had a new over-head valve Morris OPEM engine, still displacing 3485cc and rated at 25 hp. The model is distinguished by a small number of cosmetic changes including a painted, rather than chromed, radiator cowl.

It had a top speed of 123 km/h.
