= Morris Major (1931 to 1933) =

- 1931 Morris Major 6-light saloon

Overview
- Manufacturer: Morris Motors
- Production: 1930–1933; 18,494 made
- Assembly: United Kingdom: Oxfordshire, England

Body and chassis
- Body style: 4-door saloon 2-door coupe 4-door tourer
- Layout: FR layout

Powertrain
- Engine: 1938 cc I6 (1930–1931); 1803 cc I6 (1931–1933)

Chronology
- Predecessor: Morris Oxford Six
- Successor: Morris Cowley Six

The Morris Major is an automobile produced by Morris Motors in the United Kingdom from late 1930 until 1933. It was described by commentators as a Morris Oxford Six with a coachbuilt saloon body. 4025 examples of the 1931 model were produced followed by 14,469 of the 1932–33 model.

== 15 horsepower ==
Announced 30 August 1930, the Major was offered in two types of saloon and a coupé:

- Salonette, 4-passengers, black fabric £215
- Coach-built saloon 5-passengers with folding head £225
- Coach-built coupé with folding head £220

The engine was similar to that of the Morris Oxford Six as was the chassis. The nominally 14.9 hp (11.1 kW) 2-litre engine was said to generate 45 bhp (34 kW) at 3,200 rpm. The gearbox provided three forward speeds. The car was fitted with six brakes, the four-wheel ones adjustable by a single winged-nut.

== 14 horsepower ==
The Morris Major programme reported for the October 1931 Motor Show had an expanded range of five body styles:

- Chassis £160
- Tourer £210
- Sports coupé £245
- Saloon fixed or sliding head £199.10.0 or £215

The fiscal horsepower had been dropped to 13.9 from 14.9. To achieve this, the engine bore was reduced by 2.25 mm for a bore and stroke of 61.25 × 102 mm, resulting in a displacement of 1803 cc. This reduced size six-cylinder engine had a four-bearing crankshaft, an air-cleaner-heater, and a fume-consumer head. Other standard features now included chrome finished automatic radiator shutters, a 4-speed twin-top gearbox, Lockheed hydraulic brakes, and a wide 52-inch track.

== Special coupé ==
The range was extended during 1932 with a Special coupé priced at £285.
