= Morris Six MS =

Morris Six Series MS
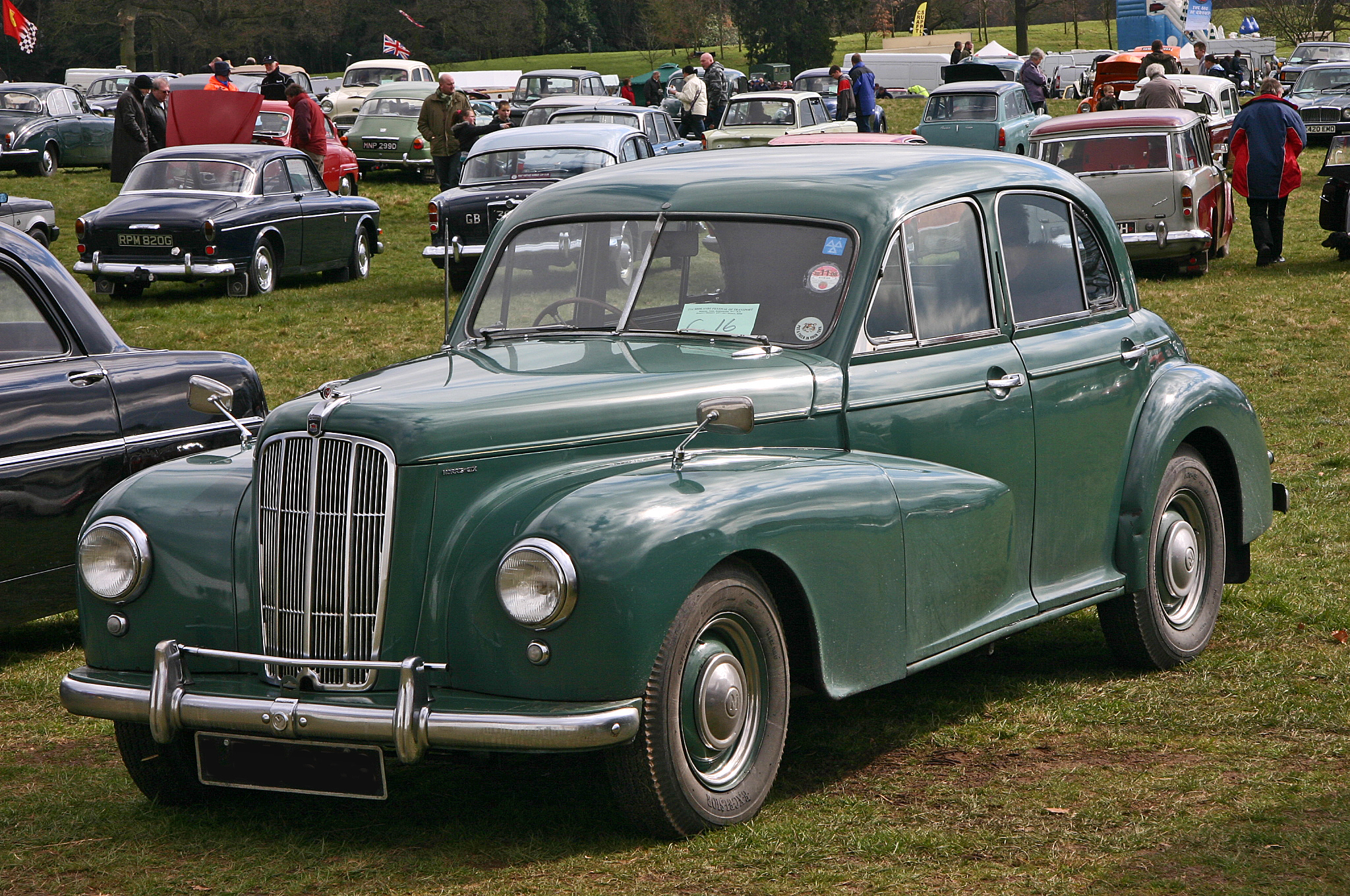
- Morris Six Series MS

Overview
- Manufacturer: Morris BMC
- Production: 1948–1953; 12,400 made

Body and chassis
- Class: Mid-size
- Body style: 4-door saloon
- Layout: FR layout
- Related: Wolseley 6/80

Powertrain
- Engine: 2,215 cc (135.2 cu in) Straight-6. overhead cam
- Transmission: 4-speed manual

Dimensions
- Wheelbase: 110 in (2,800 mm)
- Length: 177 in (4,500 mm)
- Width: 65 in (1,700 mm)
- Height: 63 in (1,600 mm)

Chronology
- Predecessor: Morris Big Six
- Successor: Morris Isis

The Morris Six Series MS is a six-cylinder midsize car from Morris Motors Limited which was produced from 1948 to 1953. Announced with Morris Motors' Minor, Oxford and Wolseley ranges on Tuesday 26 October 1948, it was Morris's first post-war six-cylinder car. All the new cars were of integral construction of chassis and body and rode on independent front suspension with torsion bars. At launch, the car was priced at £607 (including tax) on the UK market, though the price rose to £671 on 1 March 1949.

Under the old system, which was dropped that year, its engine rated at just over 20hp. With a clear external likeness to its pre-war 25hp predecessor, the car was also very similar to the Issigonis-designed Morris Oxford MO, sharing the Oxford's body shell from the scuttle backwards, and was also similar to his Minor MM. The bonnet was longer than that of the Oxford to accommodate the overhead camshaft, 2,215 cc (135.2 cu in) six-cylinder engine, which produced 70 bhp (52 kW) at 4800 rpm. The whole car was longer than the Oxford, having a wheelbase of 110 inches (2,800 mm), compared with the 97 inches (2,500 mm) wheelbase of the Oxford. The suspension at the front used independent torsion bars, and at the rear there was a conventional live axle and semi elliptic springs. The steering did not use the rack and pinion system fitted to the Oxford, but used a lower-geared Bishop Cam system. The 10-inch (250 mm) drum brakes were hydraulically operated using a Lockheed system. Production was delayed until March 1949 because of difficulties with metal fatigue in the link of the bulkhead "scuttle" to the front suspension.

Aside from the grille and identification marks, the whole car was shared with Morris's Nuffield Organization stable-mate Wolseley as the more luxuriously finished 6/80.

A car tested by the British magazine The Motor in 1950 had a top speed of 82.5 mph (132.8 km/h) and could accelerate from 0-60 mph (97 km/h) in 22.4 seconds. A fuel consumption of 20 miles per imperial gallon (14 L/100 km; 17 mpg_{‑US}) was recorded. The test car cost £671 including taxes.

In 1950, the rear axle ratio was lowered to improve acceleration, and twin dampers were fitted to the front independent torsion bar suspension.

A de-luxe version was announced at the 1953 London Motor Show, featuring leather upholstery, a heater, and over-riders on the front bumpers.

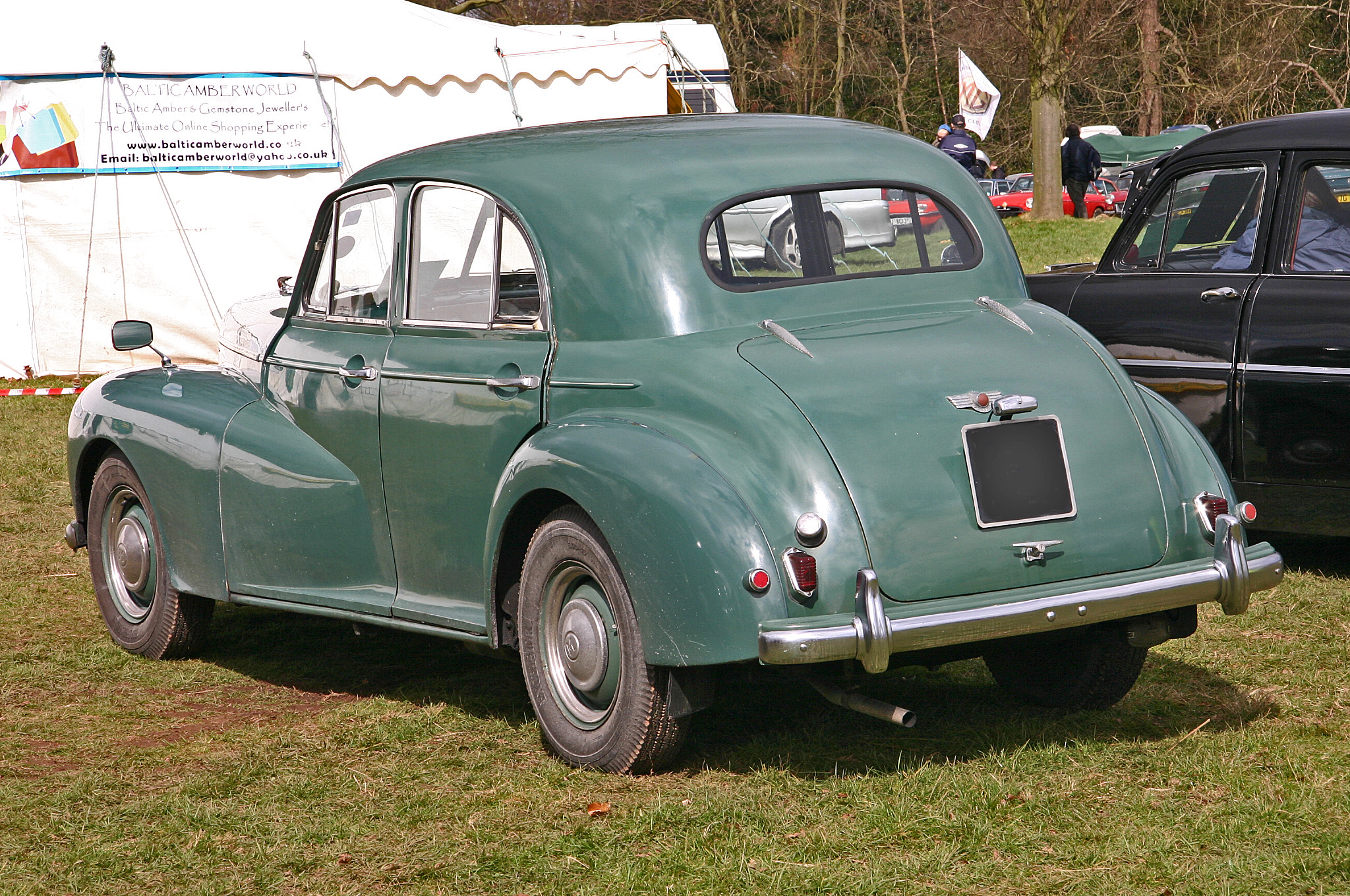
Morris Six Series MS
