= Morris Isis =

Overview
- Manufacturer: Morris BMC
- Production: 1929–1931; 1955–1958

Body and chassis
- Class: Mid-size
- Layout: FR layout

The Morris Isis name was first briefly used by Morris Motors Limited on a 6-cylinder car made from 1929 until 1931. It was resurrected on a new 6-cylinder midsize car from the British Motor Corporation in the 1950s to replace the Morris Six MS.

The name was discontinued in 1958.

== Morris Isis (1929–35) and Twenty Five (1933–35) ==
Morris Isis and Twenty Five
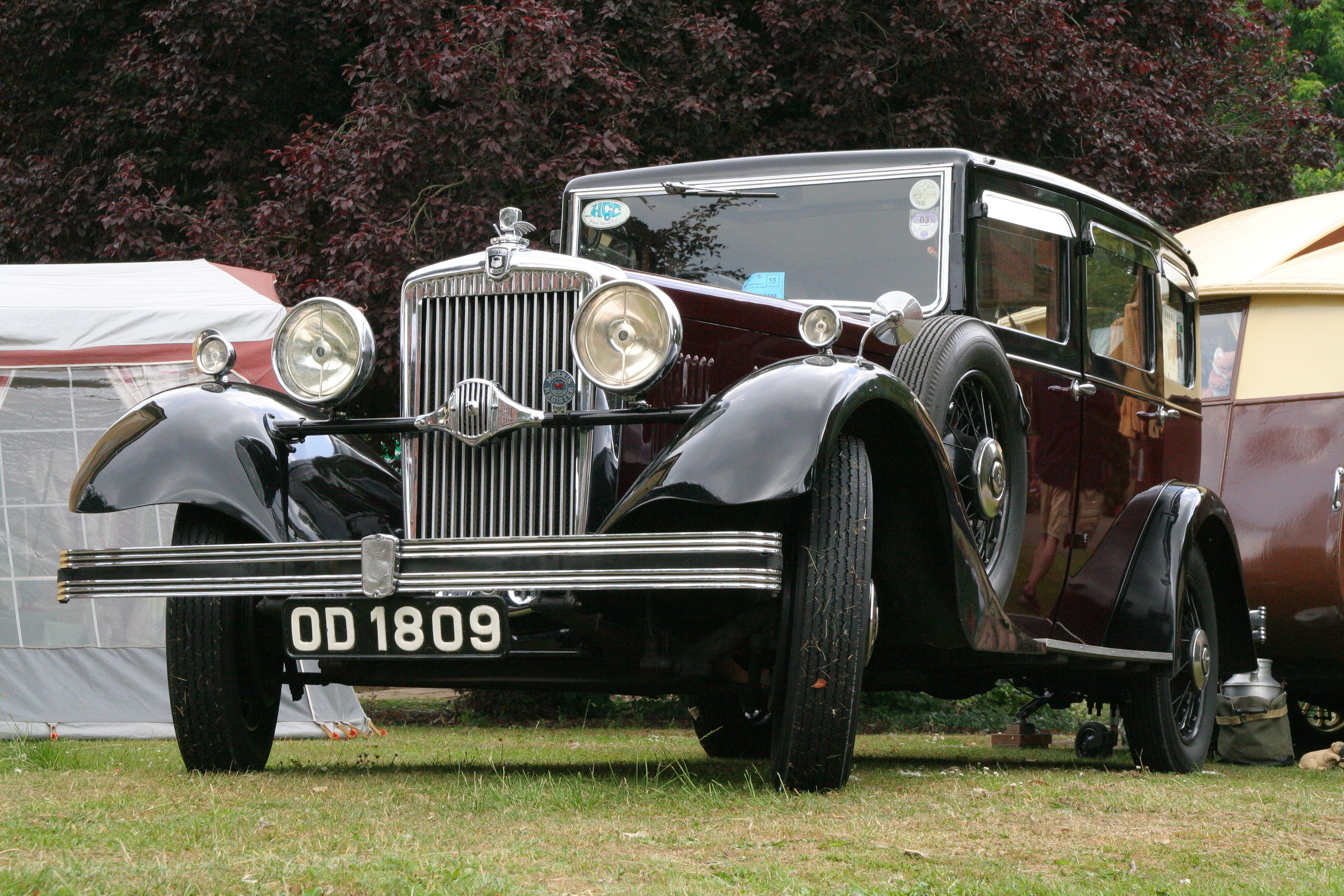
- Isis 2468cc first registered 24 March 1932

Overview
- Manufacturer: Morris Motors Limited
- Production: 1929–1935; 7406 made

Body and chassis
- Body style: 4-door saloon 4-door tourer coupé

Powertrain
- Engine: 2.5 L or 3.5 L Straight-6
- Transmission: 3- or 4-speed manual

Dimensions
- Wheelbase: 120 in (3,048 mm)
- Length: 178 in (4,521 mm)
- Width: 71 in (1,803 mm)

The Isis announced in July 1929 was a revised version of the 1927 Morris Six JA series and used the same 2468 cc engine and 3-speed gearbox. It had an all-new chassis, and the steel body had an American look, not surprising, as the body pressing dies made by Budd for the Morris-Budd joint venture, Pressed Steel Company, were shared with some Dodge models. William Morris had recognised the potential of pressed steel car bodies and introduced them to Europe in Pressed Steel Company, a joint venture with Budd, sited beside William Morris's Cowley plant.

It was the first Morris to have hydraulic brakes and chromium plating replaced the previous nickel finish on brightwork.

The car could exceed 65 mph (105 km/h) and return 28 miles per imperial gallon (10 L/100 km; 23 mpg_{‑US}).

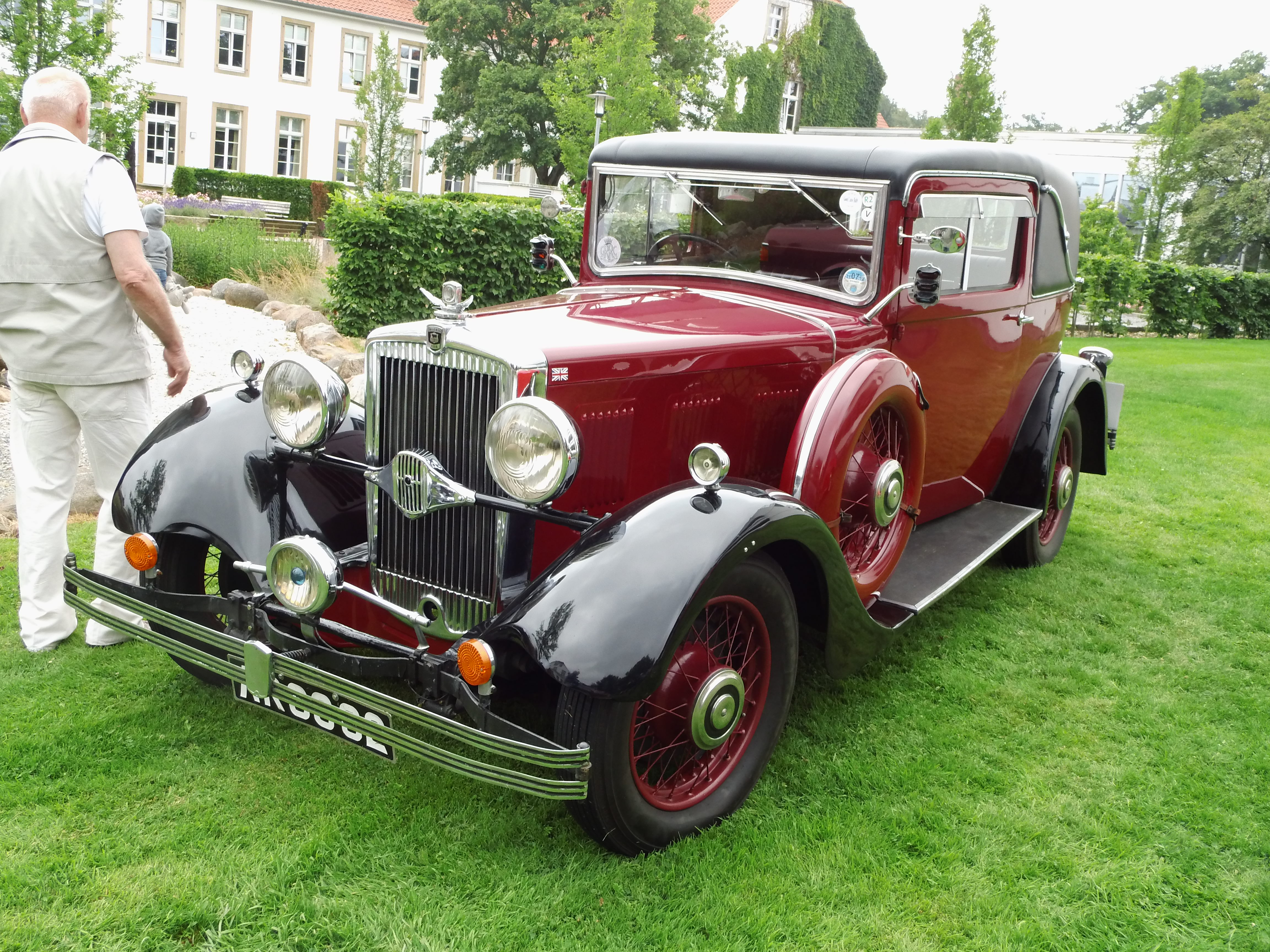
Isis Special Coupé reg'd 1933

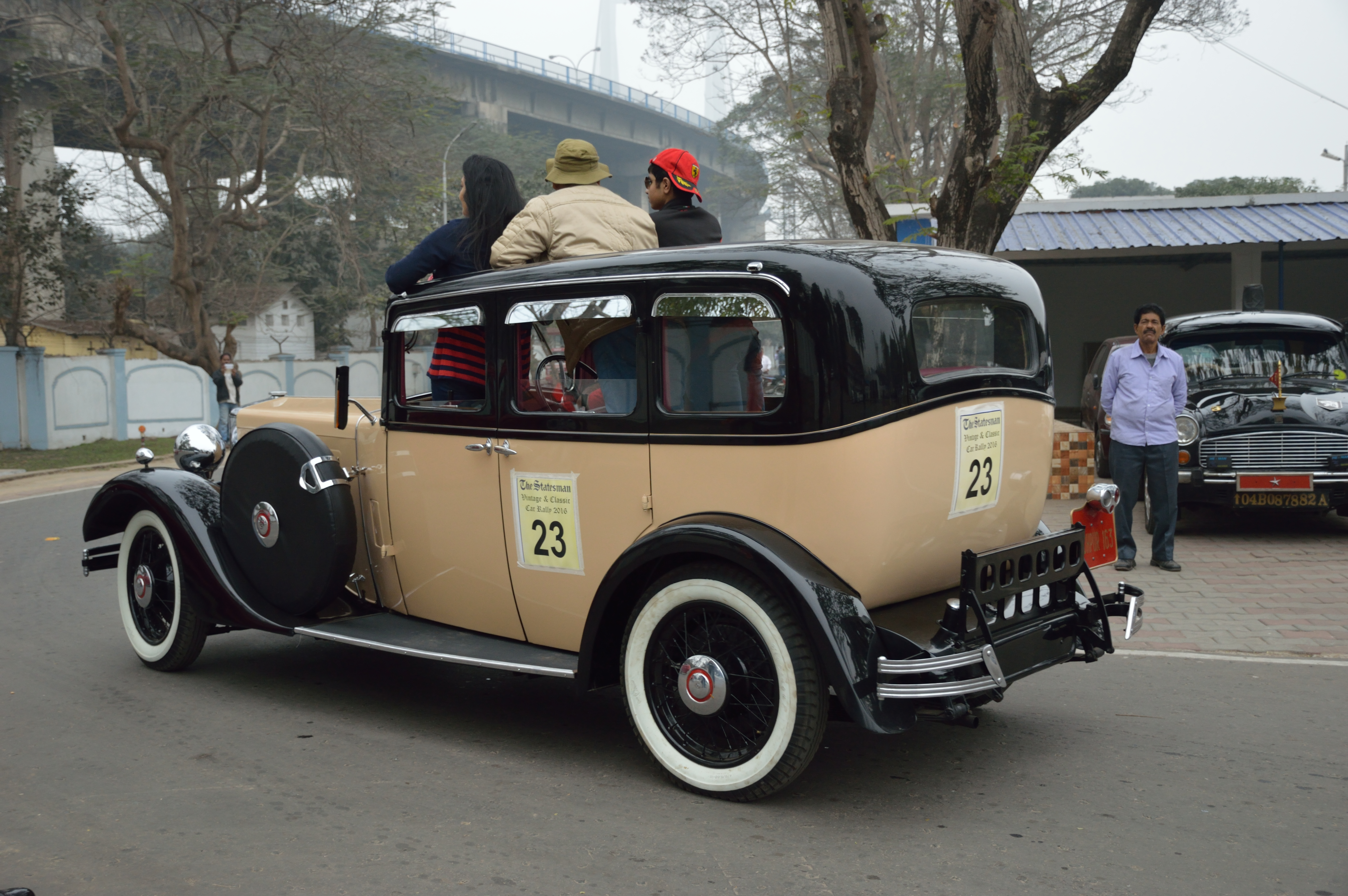
Morris Twenty-five

=== Facelift ===
After 3,939 of the original Isis model had been made it received a facelift announced 1 September 1932. Following the court-forced separation of William Morris from his joint venture with Edward G Budd the all-steel body was replaced by a traditional wood-frame construction. Mechanically the car was similar but the gearbox received synchromesh and a fourth speed (Twin-Top), the chassis received additional cross bracing in 1934 and an automatic clutch and freewheel were fitted to some models. 3,467 of the new Isis were made (including Twenty-Five models).

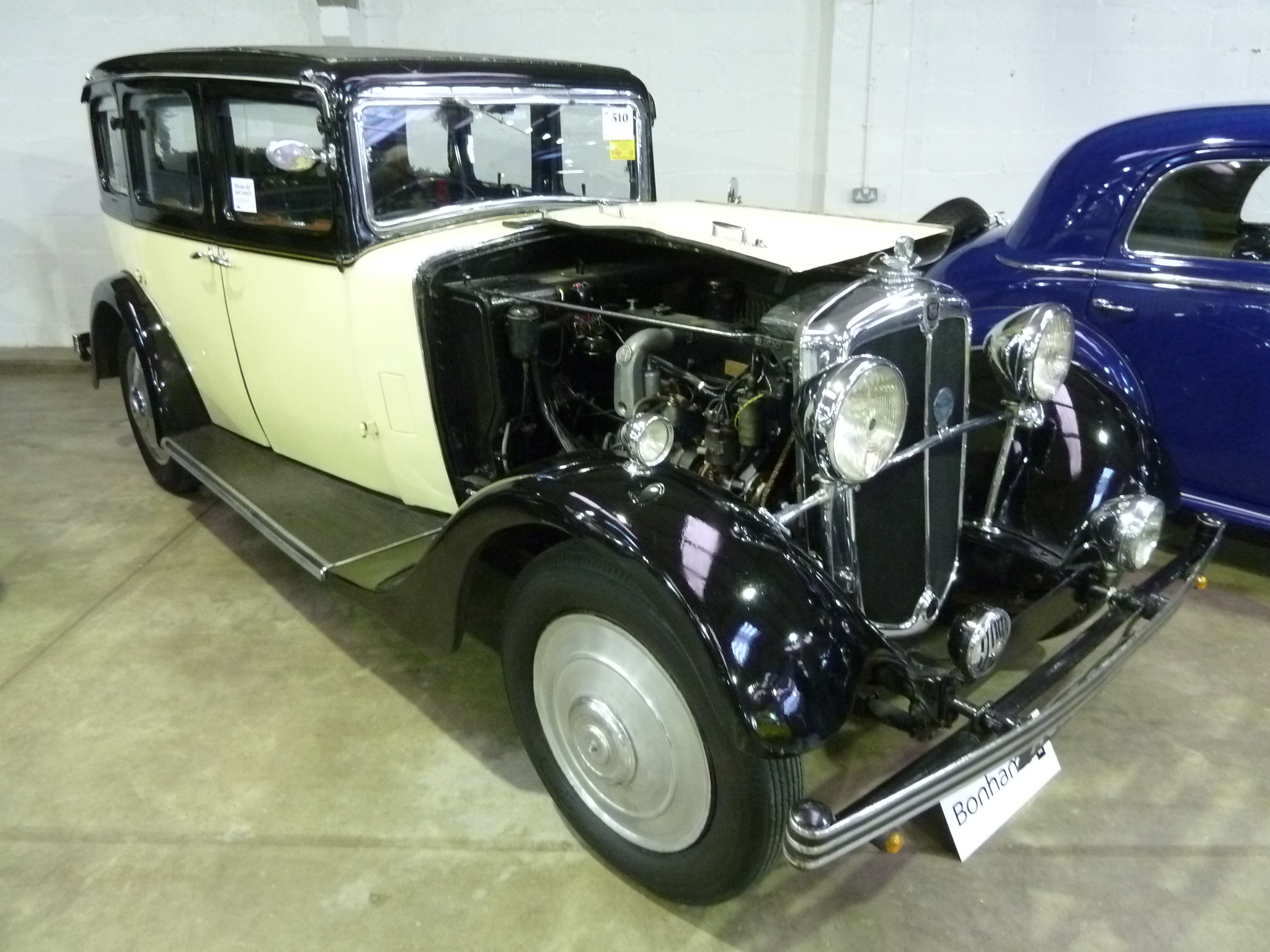
Isis saloon reg July 1934

=== Morris Twenty-Five ===
A de-luxe version, the Morris Twenty-Five was launched 12 October 1932 for the 1932 London Motor Show with larger 3485 cc engine. It was replaced in July 1935 by a new Twenty-Five, the flagship of the Morris Big Six Series II range, and given an overhead valve engine (as the Series III) in August 1938 with the rest of the Morris range.

== Isis Series I (1955–56) ==
Morris Isis Series I
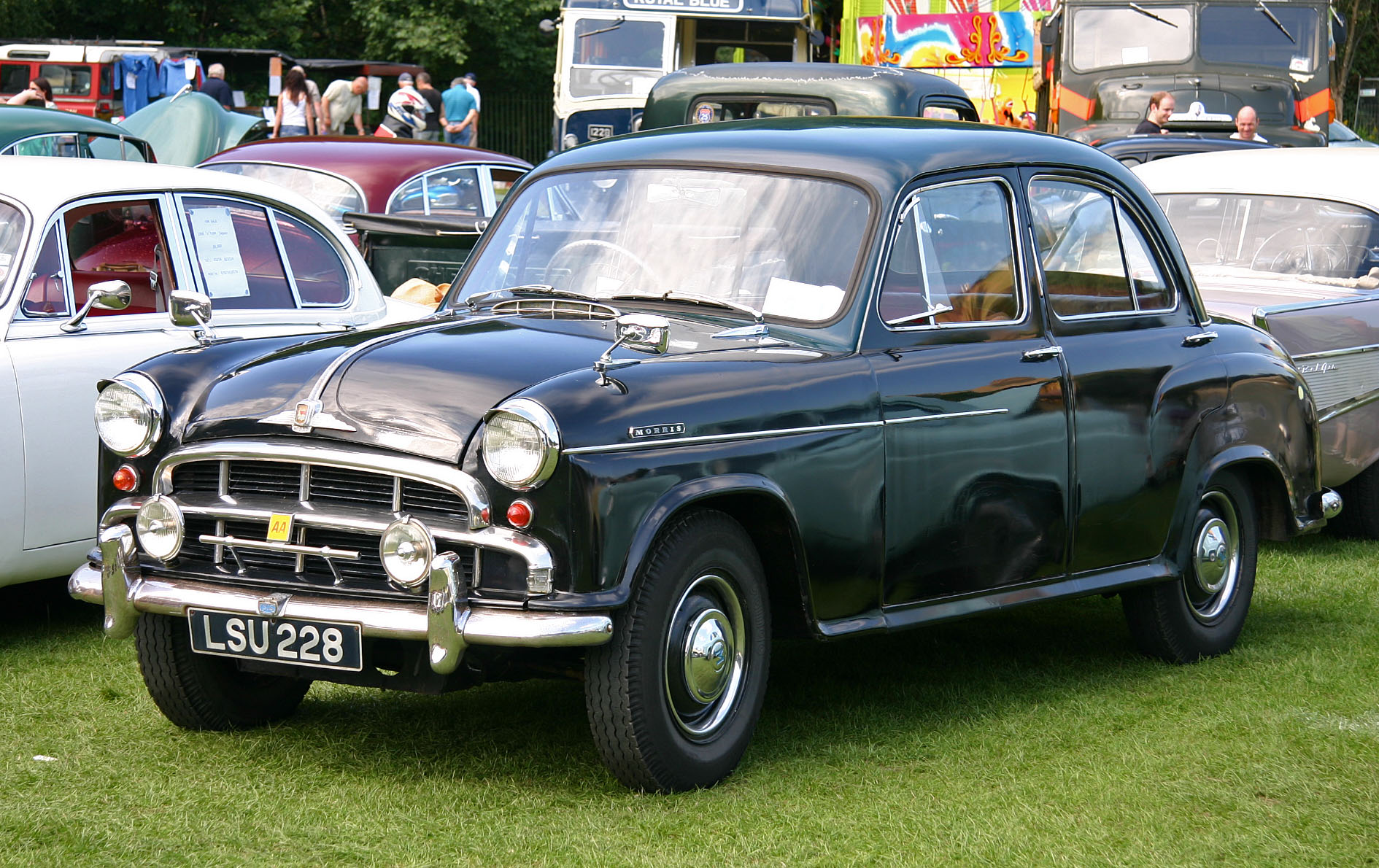

Overview
- Manufacturer: BMC
- Production: 1955–1956; 8541 made
- Assembly: United Kingdom; Victoria Park, Australia

Body and chassis
- Body style: 4-door saloon 2-door estate car
- Related: Morris Oxford Series II

Powertrain
- Engine: 2.6 L C-Series Straight-6
- Transmission: 4-speed manual optional overdrive

Chronology
- Predecessor: Morris Six MS

The Series I Isis was launched in March 1955 as a replacement for the Morris Six MS. It featured a 6-cylinder engine, the 2.6 L (2,639 cc; 161.0 cu in), 86 bhp (64 kW) C-Series unit from the Austin Westminster. Unlike the Westminster, the Isis had a single SU carburettor. The four-speed gearbox had a column change and was available with an optional Borg-Warner overdrive unit.

The car was based on the four-cylinder Morris Oxford Series II, sharing its almost-unibody shell and torsion bar front suspension. The wheelbase and front end were lengthened to accept the larger straight-six engine, and a "woody" 2-door estate version was also available. With this engine, the Isis could reach 90 mph (145 km/h).

Unlike its sister car, the Austin Westminster, which enjoyed moderate success against the volume-selling Ford and Vauxhall sixes of the time, sales were poor, with only 8,500 sold.

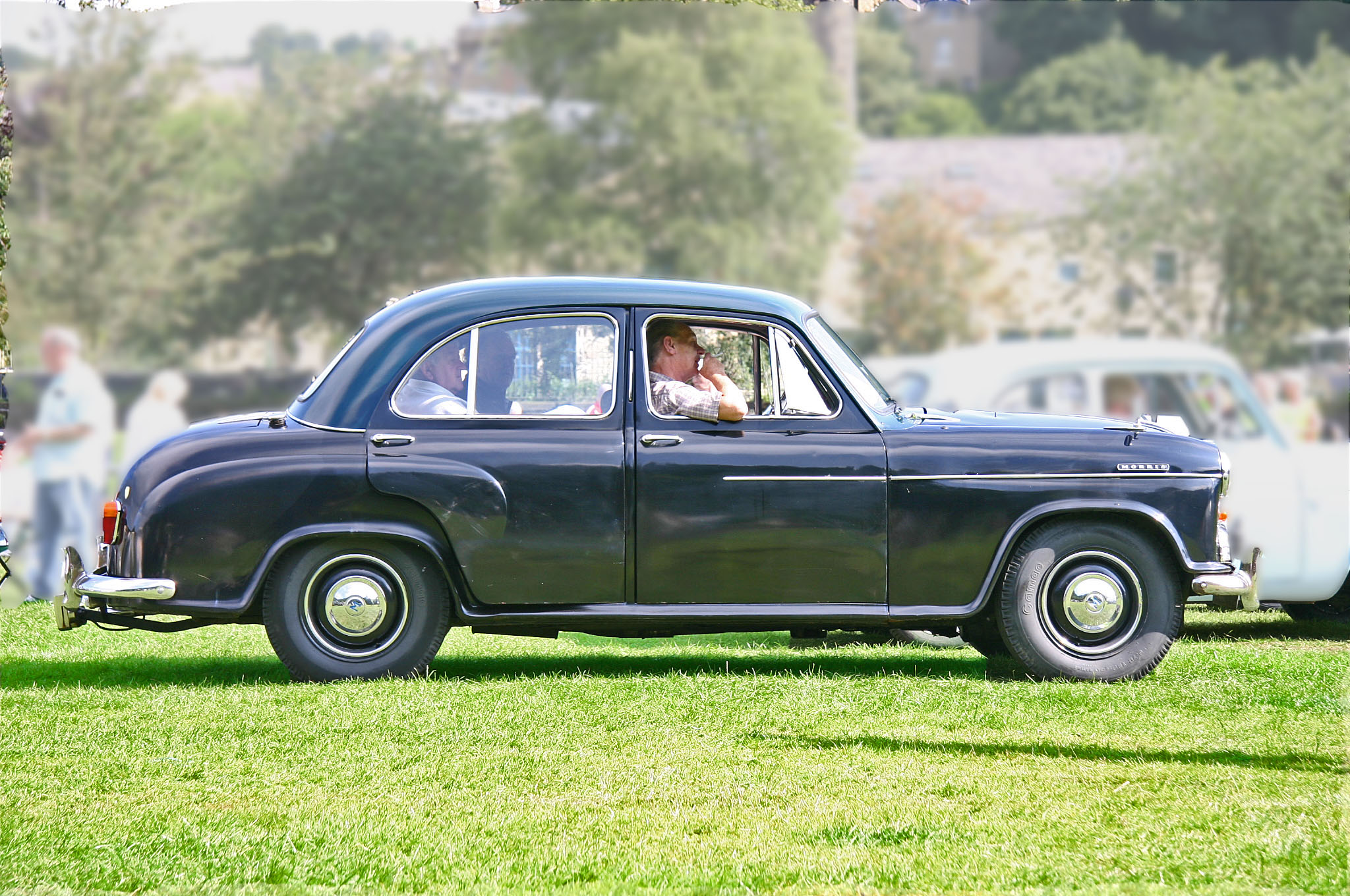
Morris Isis Series I

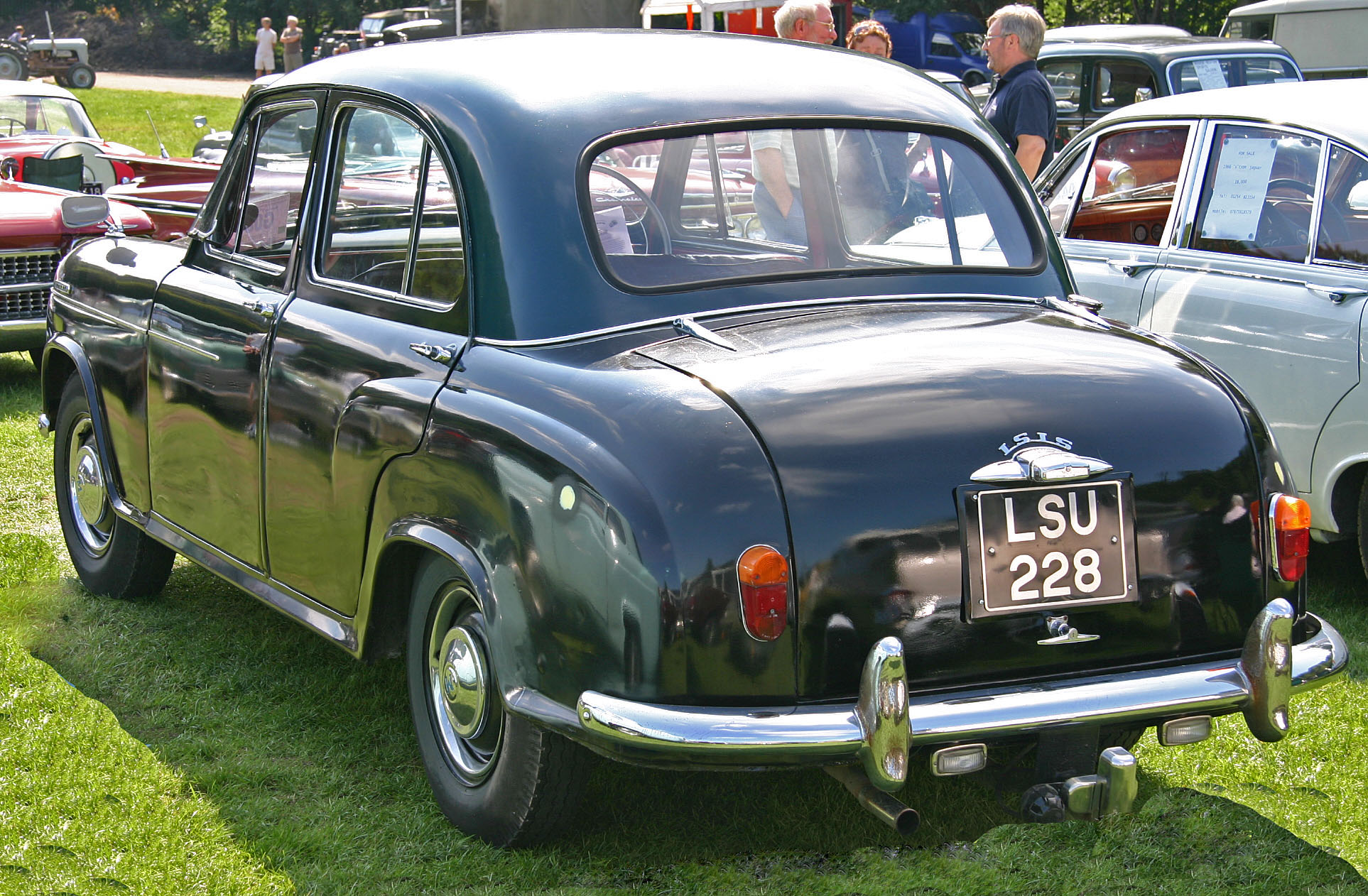
Morris Isis Series I

== Isis Series II (1956–58) ==
Morris Isis Series II
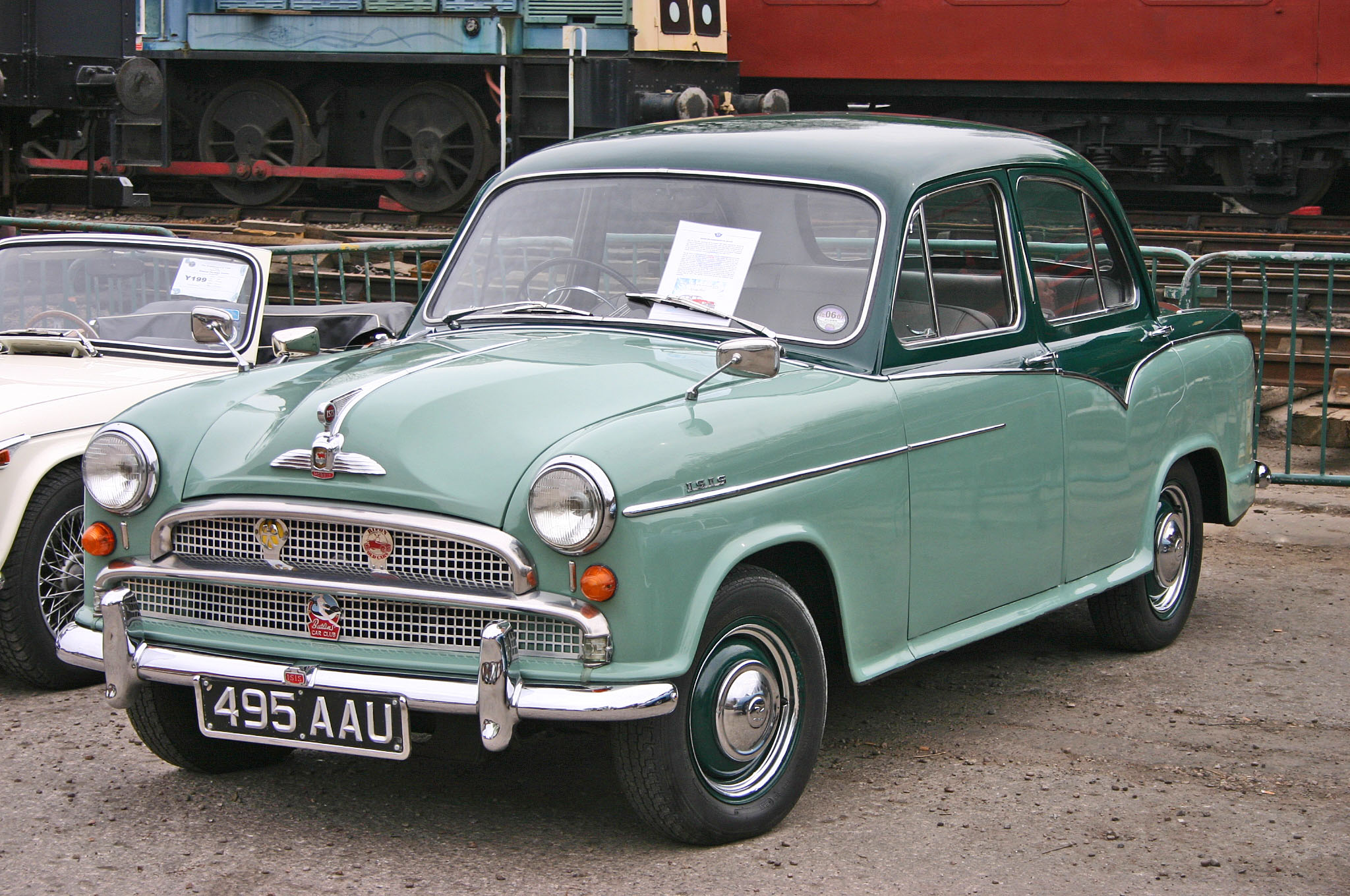

Overview
- Manufacturer: BMC
- Production: 1956–1958; 3614 made

Body and chassis
- Body style: 4-door saloon 2-door estate car

Powertrain
- Engine: 2.6 L C-Series Straight-6
- Transmission: 4-speed manual, Overdrive optional, Automatic available

Dimensions
- Wheelbase: 107.5 in (2,730 mm)
- Length: 178 in (4,521 mm)
- Width: 65 in (1,651 mm)

Chronology
- Successor: Line discontinued in favour of Wolseley 6/99

The Morris Isis Series II was based on the Morris Oxford Series III body but again with longer wheelbase and differing front wings and bonnet to accommodate the larger, six-cylinder engine.

In line with changes to the corresponding Oxford line, BMC redesigned the Isis for 1956 with updated styling including a more elaborate mesh grille, chrome side strips and small fins. The engine power increased to 90 bhp (67 kW). An automatic transmission option was also added. The manual version had a four-speed box operated by a short gearstick on the right-hand side of the front bench seat. The handbrake lever was just behind the gearstick. Sales remained weak, and the line ended in 1958.

A de luxe saloon with overdrive tested by British magazine The Motor in 1956 had a top speed of 90 mph (145 km/h) and could accelerate from 0–60 mph (97 km/h) in 17.6 seconds. A fuel consumption of 26.2 miles per imperial gallon (10.8 L/100 km; 21.8 mpg_{‑US}) was recorded. The test car cost £1025 including taxes. The overdrive unit had added £63 to the price.

There was also a Traveller version with similar rear design to the Morris Oxford Estate car. The Isis Traveller accommodated the spare wheel either within the rear well or, when it was required to use this region for a passenger (the small floor area was hinged with a padded underside so that the passenger faced "backwards"), then the spare would be attached to the nearside, again to the rear of the vehicle. In this way it would be possible to accommodate two adult passengers on the front bench seat next to the driver, three in the middle rear bench seat and one in the very back.

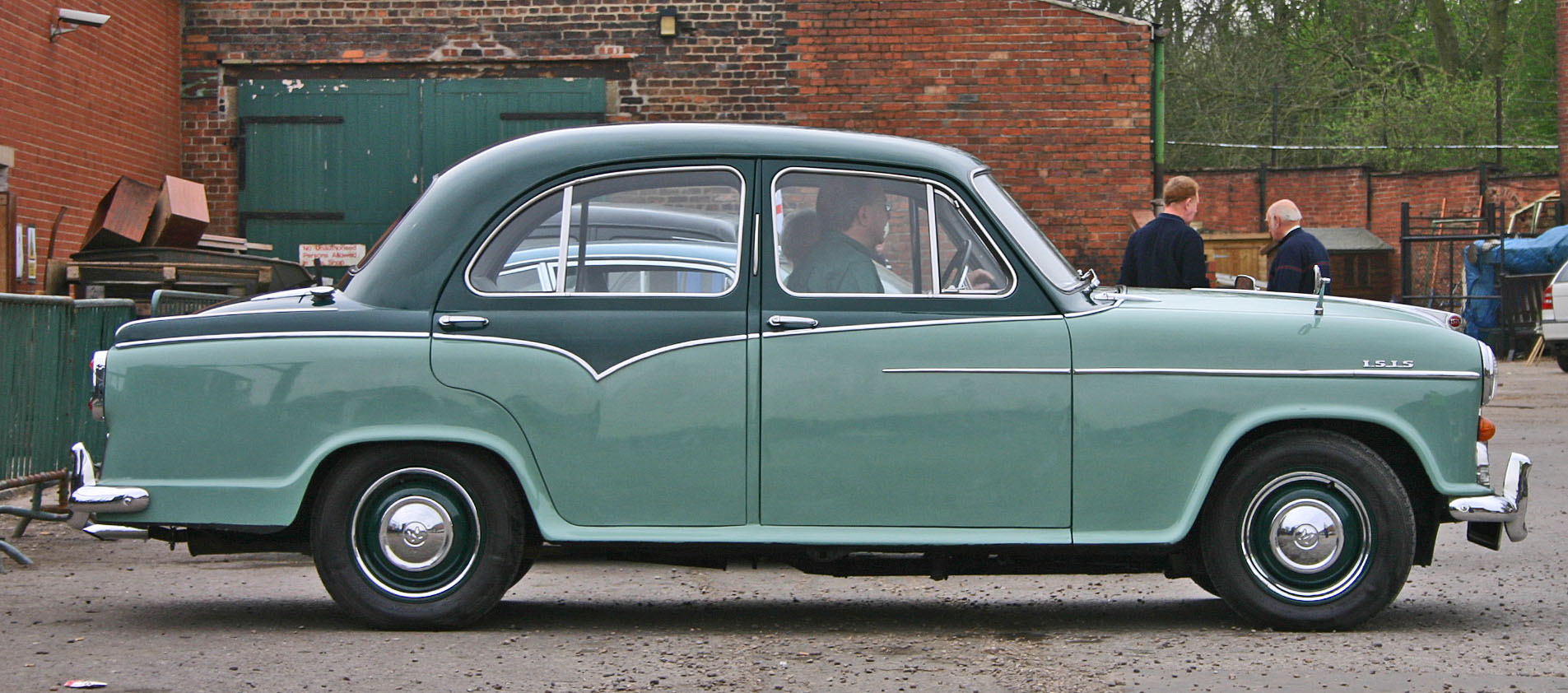
Morris Isis Series II

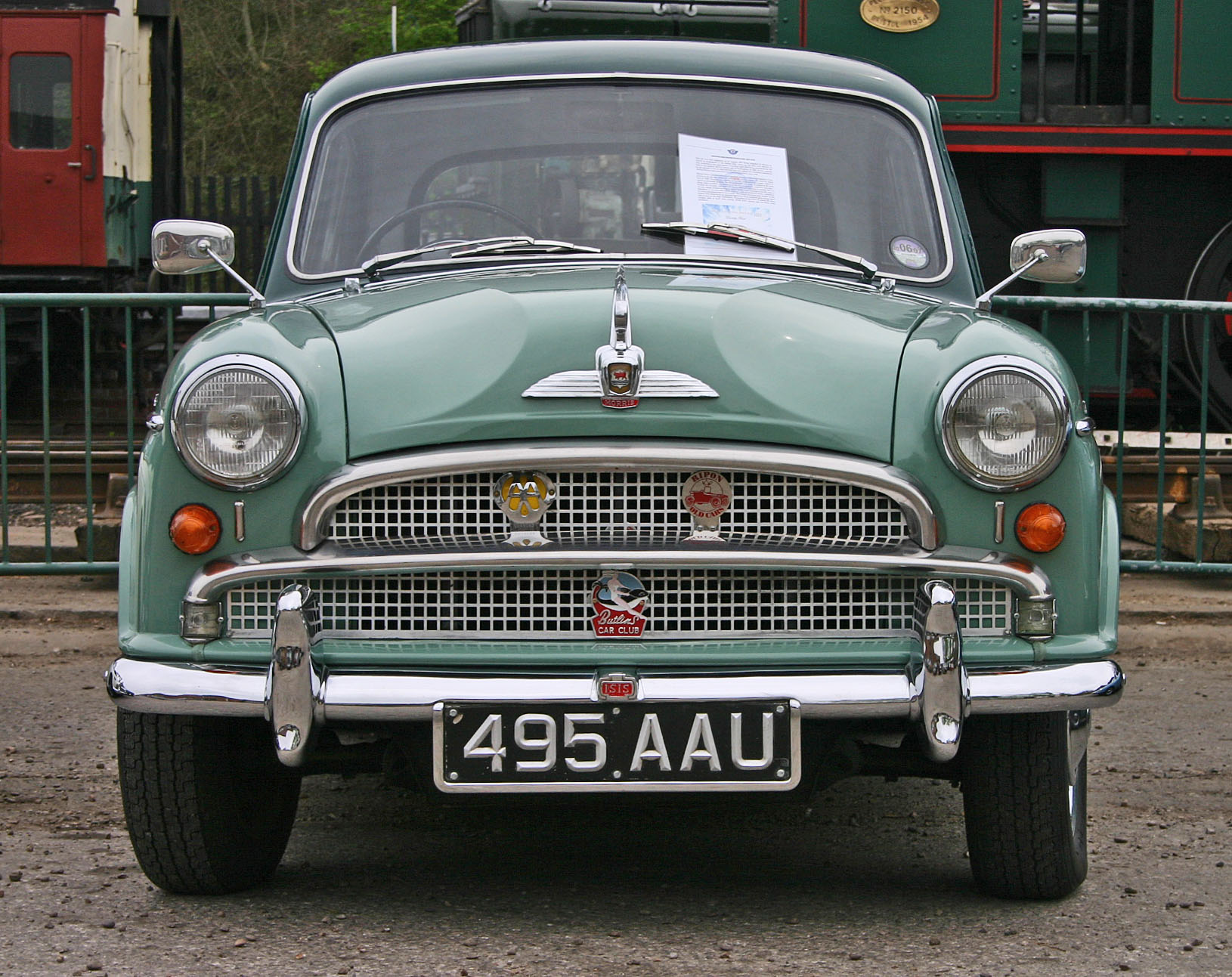
Morris Isis Series II

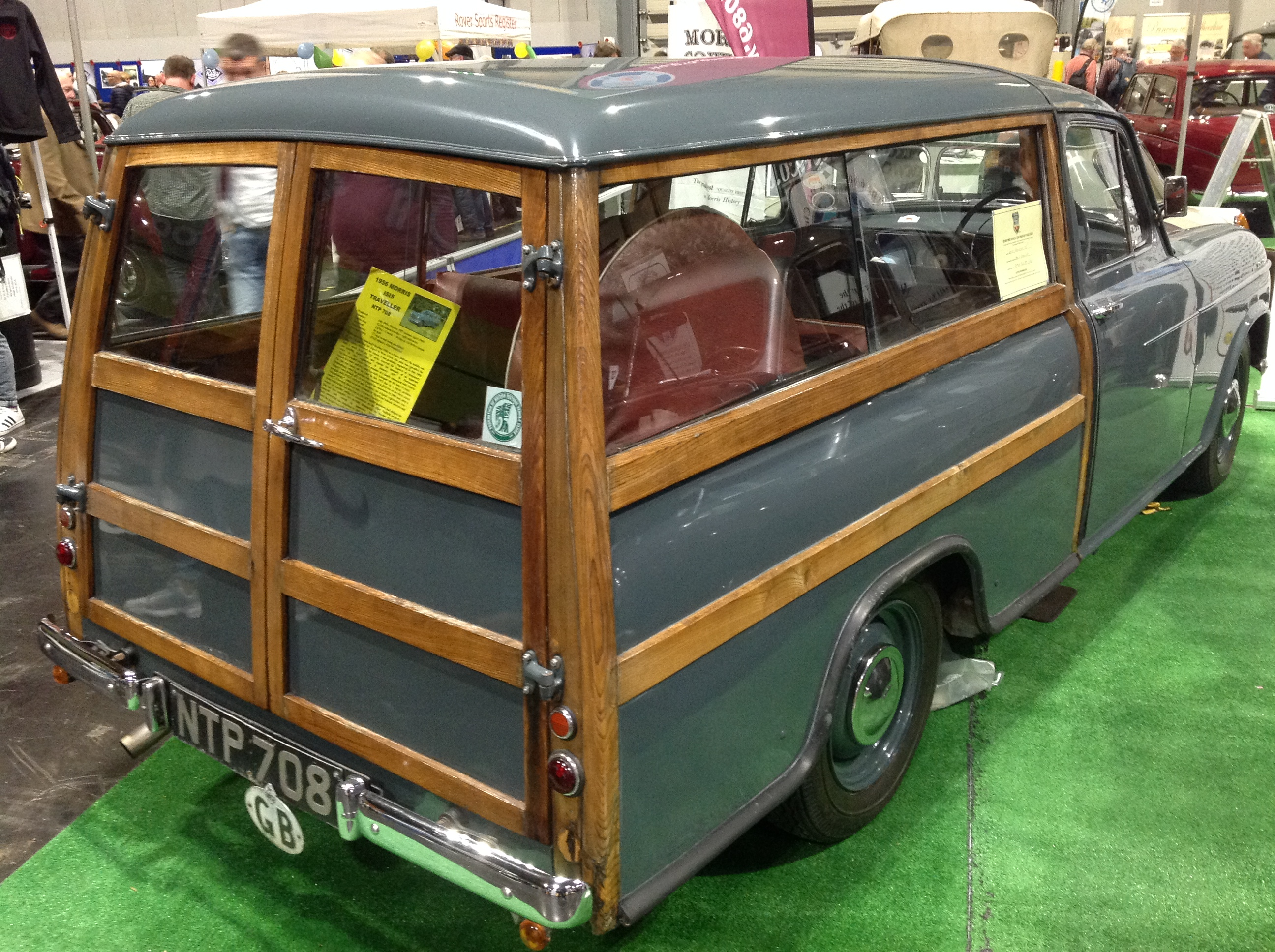
Morris Isis Series II Traveller
