= Nuffield Organization =

Automobile manufacturing brand

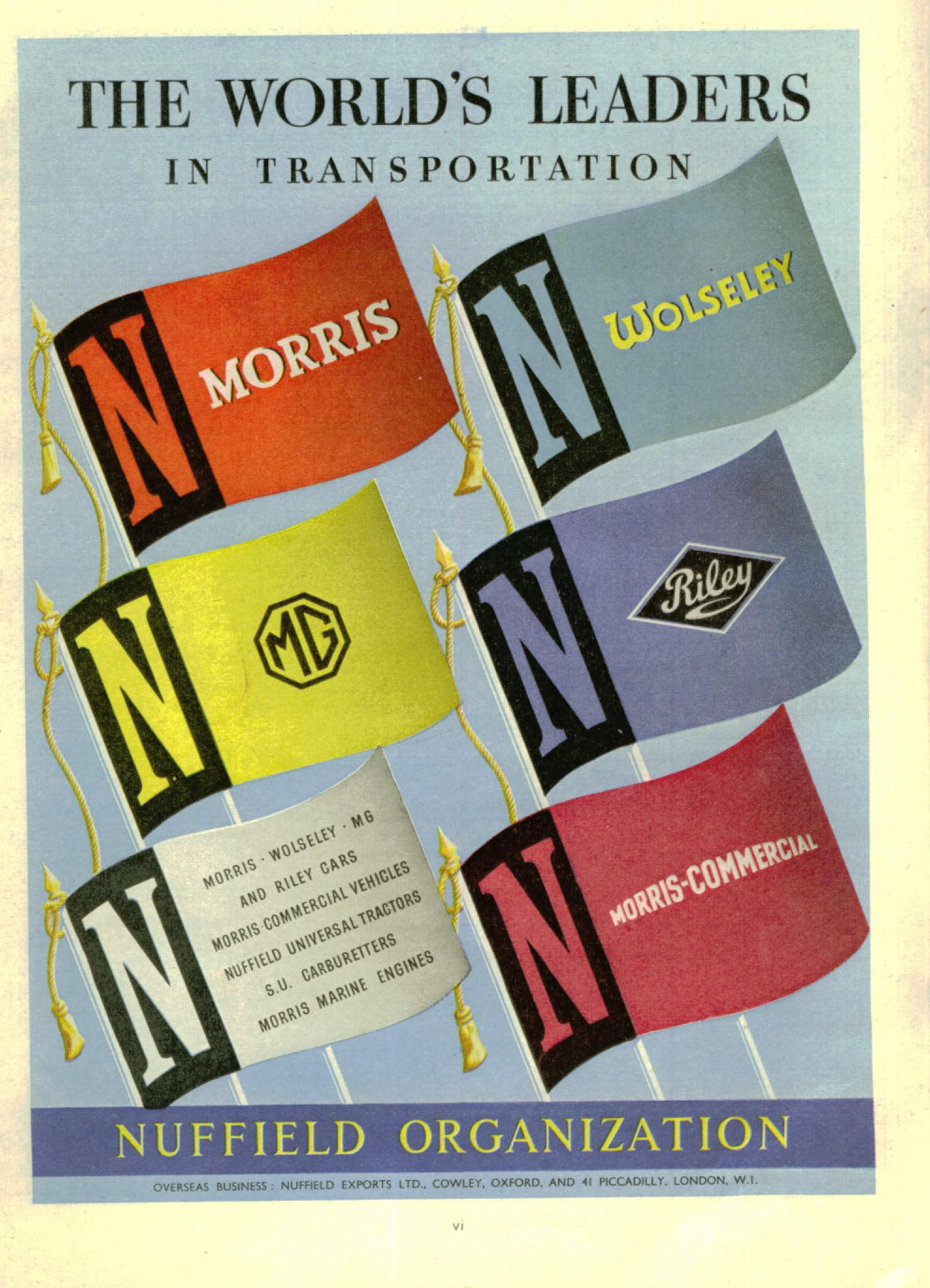
- Nuffield Organization advertisement: 1951
- Predecessor: The Morris Organizations
- Successor: British Motor Corporation
- Formation: 1943
- Founder: The Viscount Nuffield
- Headquarters: Cowley, Oxford
- Services: Health and automotive industry
- Leader: William Morris, Viscount Nuffield

Nuffield Organization was the unincorporated umbrella-name or promotional name used for the charitable and commercial interests of owner and donor, William Morris, 1st Viscount Nuffield. The name was adopted following Nuffield's gift to establish his Nuffield Foundation in 1943, which linked his business interests to his existing very generous philanthropy. The same enterprises had previously been referred to as the Morris Organizations and at first described itself as The Nuffield Organization, A Cornerstone of Britain's Industrial Structure. (Note: "Morris Motors Limited and its associated companies, which together form what is now generally known as the Nuffield Organization." Morris Motors Limited. Statement by the Vice-Chairman, Sir Miles Thomas, D.F.C. circulated with the report and accounts. The Times, Saturday, 7 June 1947; pg. 7; Issue 50781)

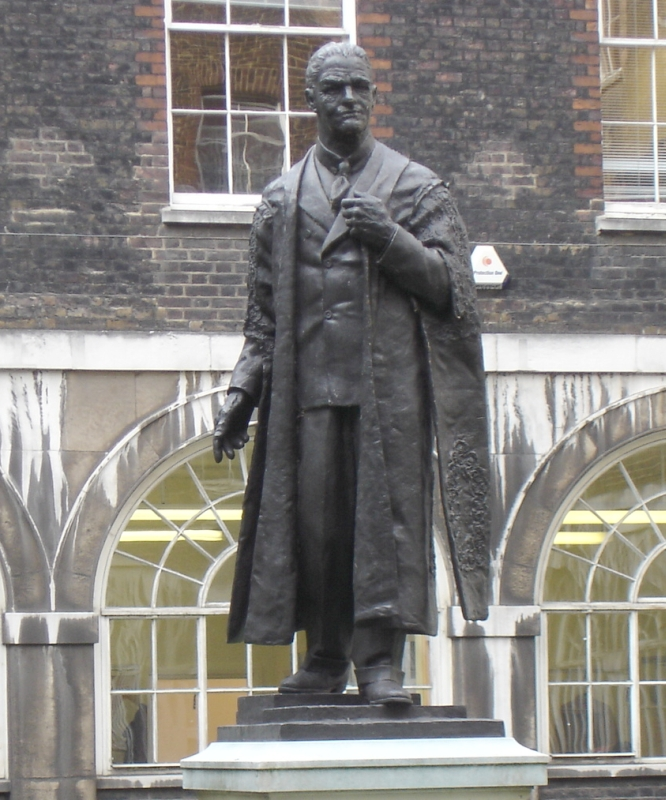
Viscount Nuffield Guy's Hospital, London

== Productive members of the Nuffield Organization ==
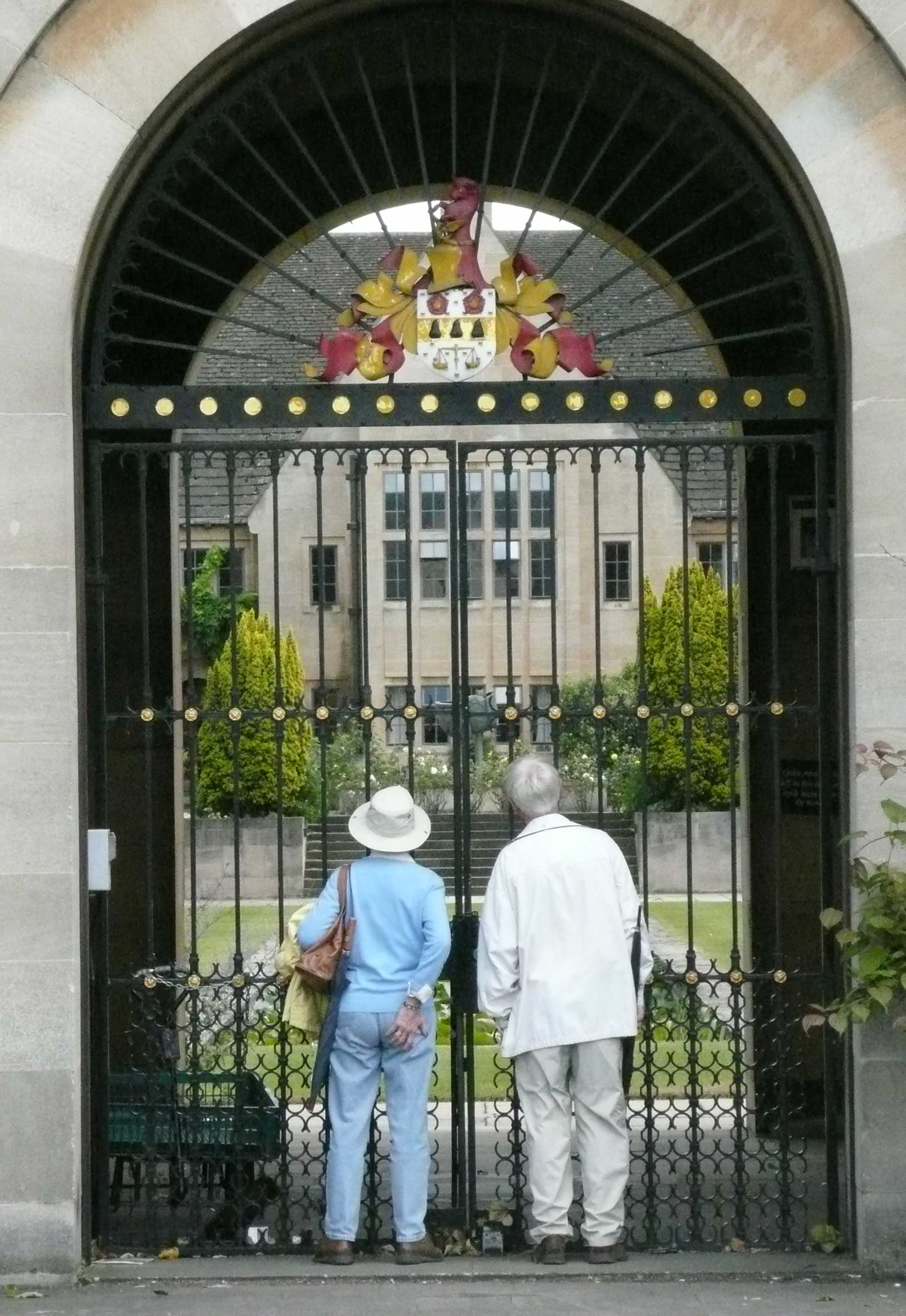
Nuffield College, Oxford the west gate

The productive businesses were owned by Morris Motors Limited and this corporate structure appears to have been retained until the formation of British Leyland in 1968.

In 1945 the principal businesses among them were:

- Morris Motors Limited - Morris vehicles which was also the Nuffield Organization's holding company for:
  - Wolseley Motors Limited – Wolseley cars
  - Riley (Coventry) Limited – Riley cars
  - The M.G. Car Company Limited – MG cars
  - Morris Commercial Cars Limited – producing vans and trucks
- The S.U. Carburetter Company Limited

and included:

- Nuffield Acceptances Limited – Arranged finance in connection with hire-purchase agreements for the purchase of motor cars
- Nuffield (Australia) Pty Limited
- Nuffield Exports Limited
- Nuffield Mechanizations Limited – produced tanks during the war
- Nuffield Metal Products Limited
- Nuffield Tools and Gauges Limited – production equipment for the other companies
- The Nuffield Press Limited – publishing handbooks, owners' magazine etc.

== Morris-Austin merger ==
An agreement was reached between Morris and The Austin Motor Company in October 1948 amounting to amalgamation in everything but financial structure. The terms included the constant interchange of information on production methods, research, design, buying and almost every other aspect of their work. It also envisaged the pooling of factory resources. In July 1949 Morris and Austin announced the end of their scheme, no further steps would be taken to pool production resources and no merger of any kind was contemplated.

"Nuffield and Austin broke off arrangements for the exchange of confidential information in 1949 following the revival of long-standing hostilities between their chief executives and the Labour Party's decision not to include the industry in its plans for future nationalisation." Leonard Lord, chief of Austin, had been with Morris from 1923 to 1936, the last four years as Morris's chief executive. They had parted on extremely bad terms.

The motoring correspondent of The Times said the two concerns were fundamentally different in their structure. The Nuffield Organization under the control of Morris Motors made three Morris models with Wolseley (two), Riley (two), MG (two) as well as Morris Commercial trucks, Nuffield Universal tractors and marine engines. The main factory was at Cowley, Oxford, there were more at Birmingham, Coventry and Abingdon. The Austin business, Austin of England, was highly concentrated both in its huge Longbridge factory at Birmingham and in its products: six Austin car models, Austin trucks and marine engines and battery electric vehicles.

The nine different cars made by Nuffield using six engines and five (and a half) car bodies of which the "specialist" three were obsolescent, the rest very closely related if not identical.

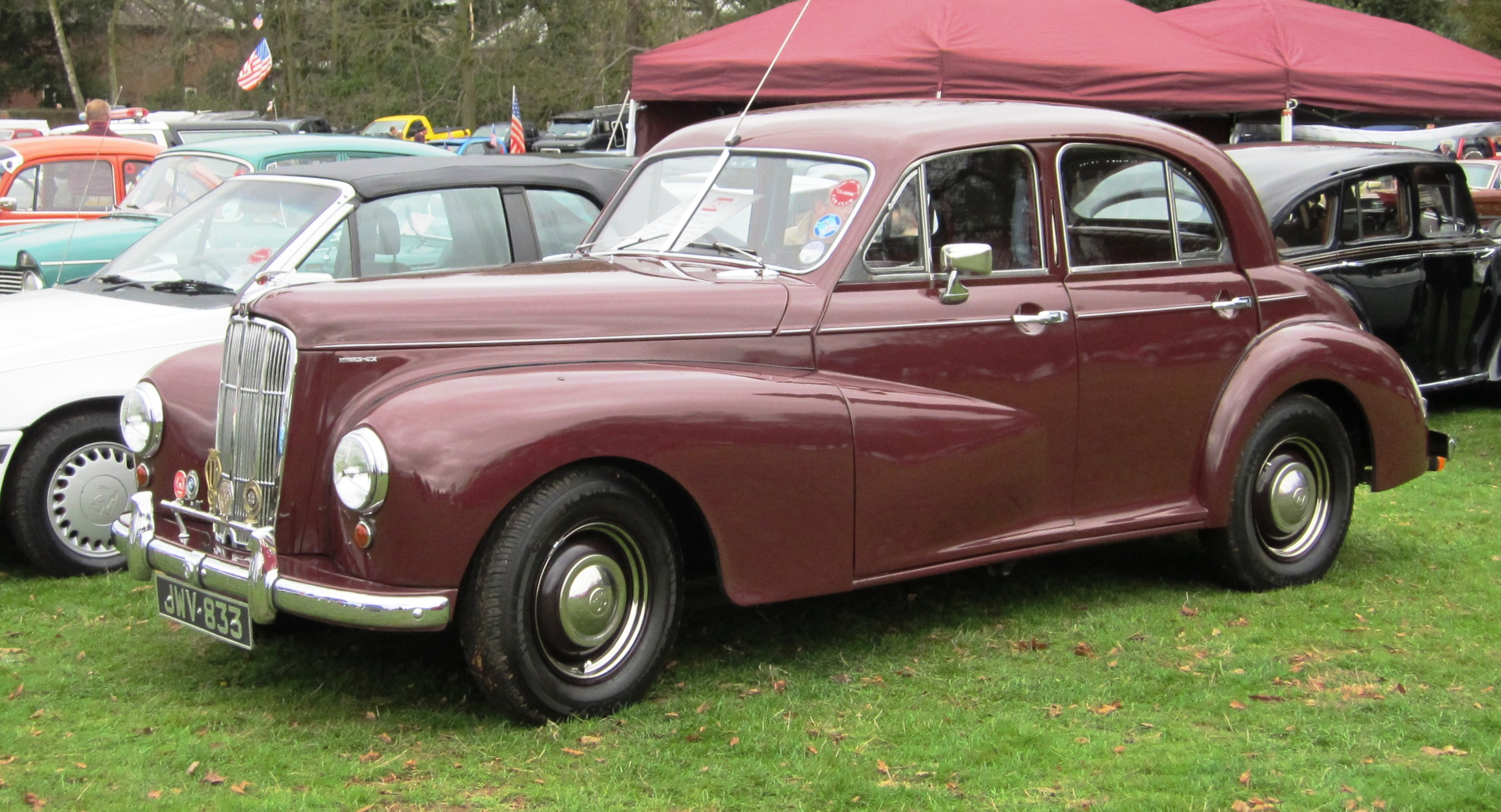
Morris Six
2215 cc

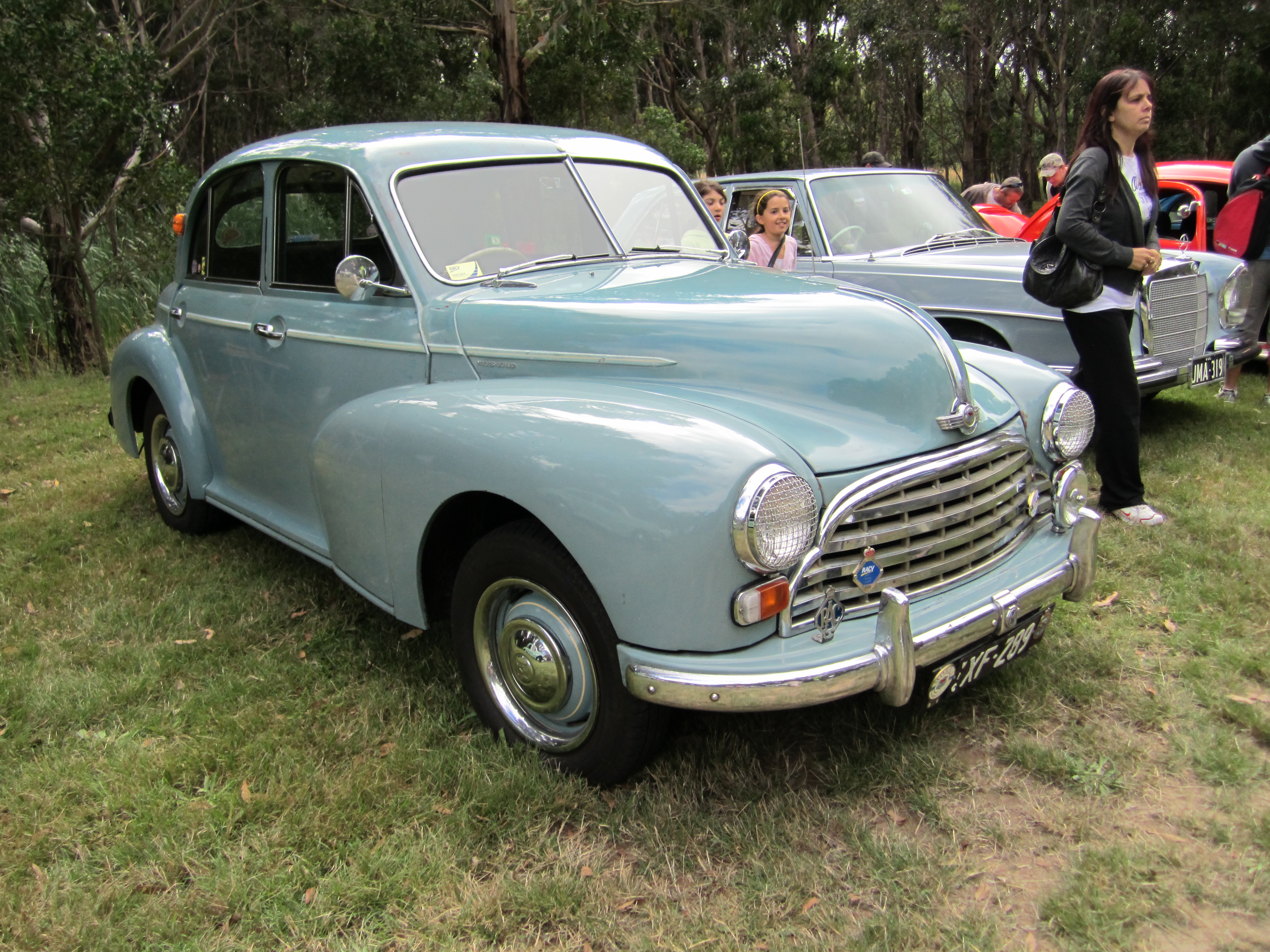
Morris Oxford
1476 cc

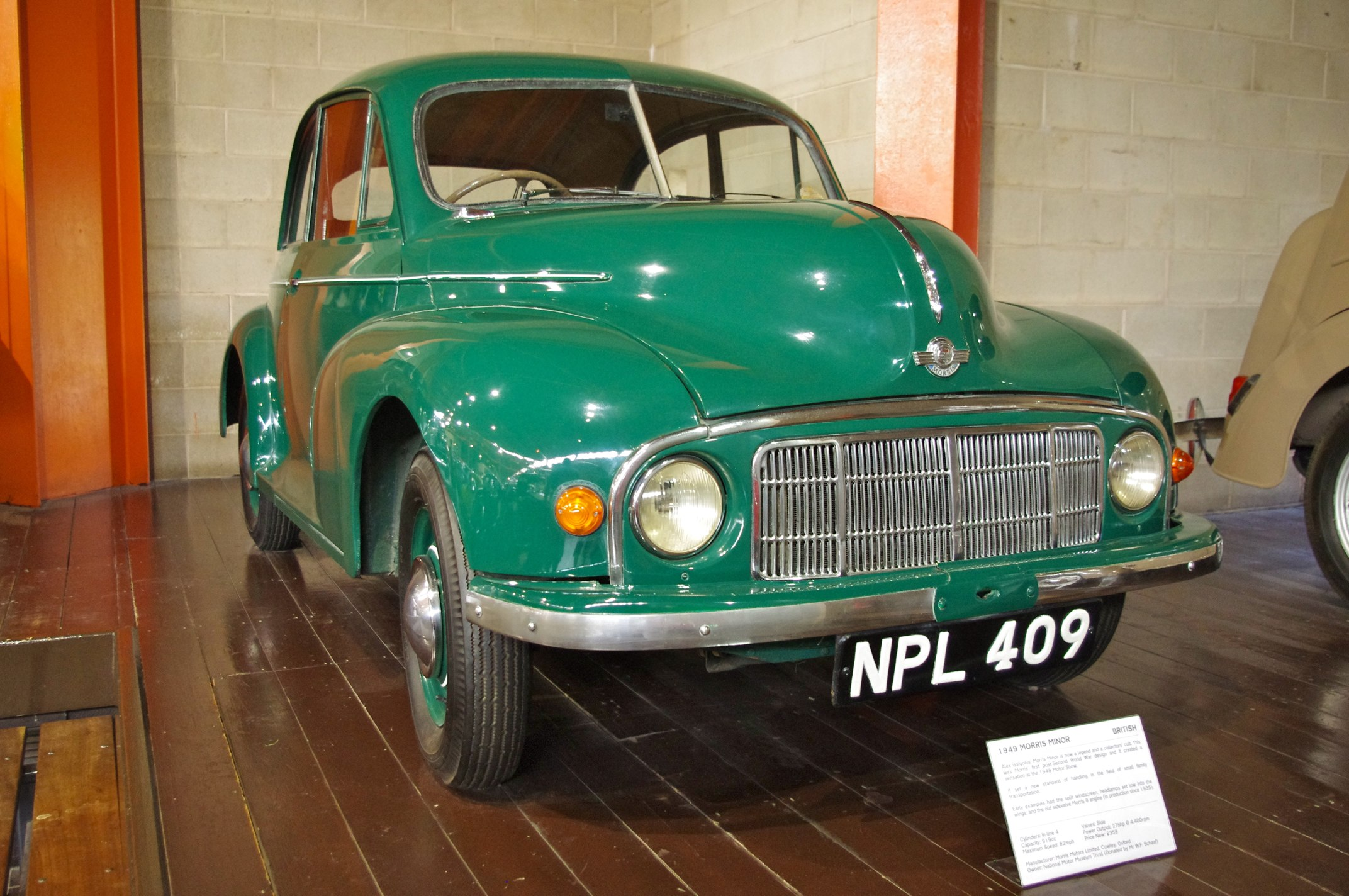
Morris Minor
918 cc

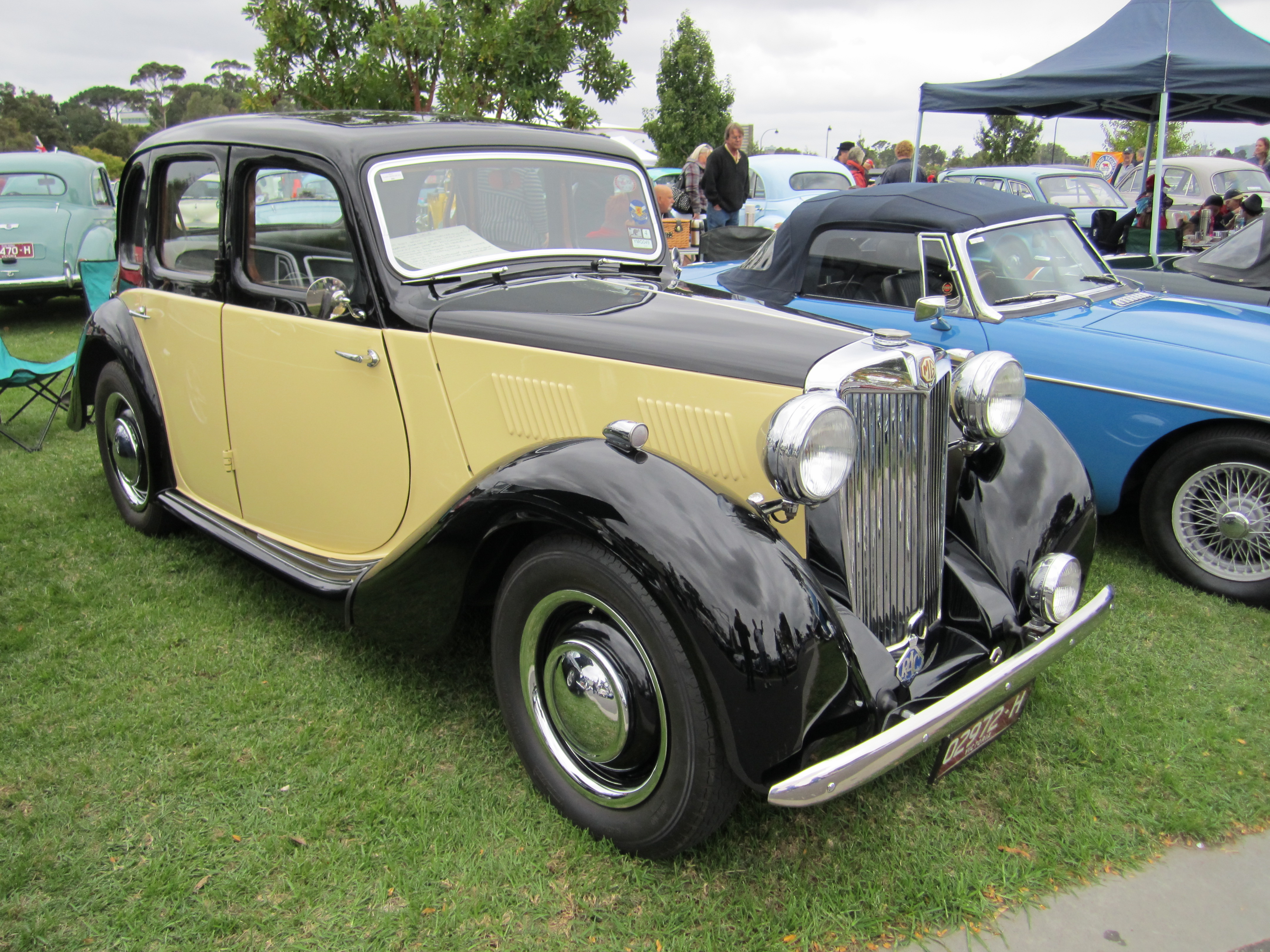
MG 1¼-litre saloon
1250 cc

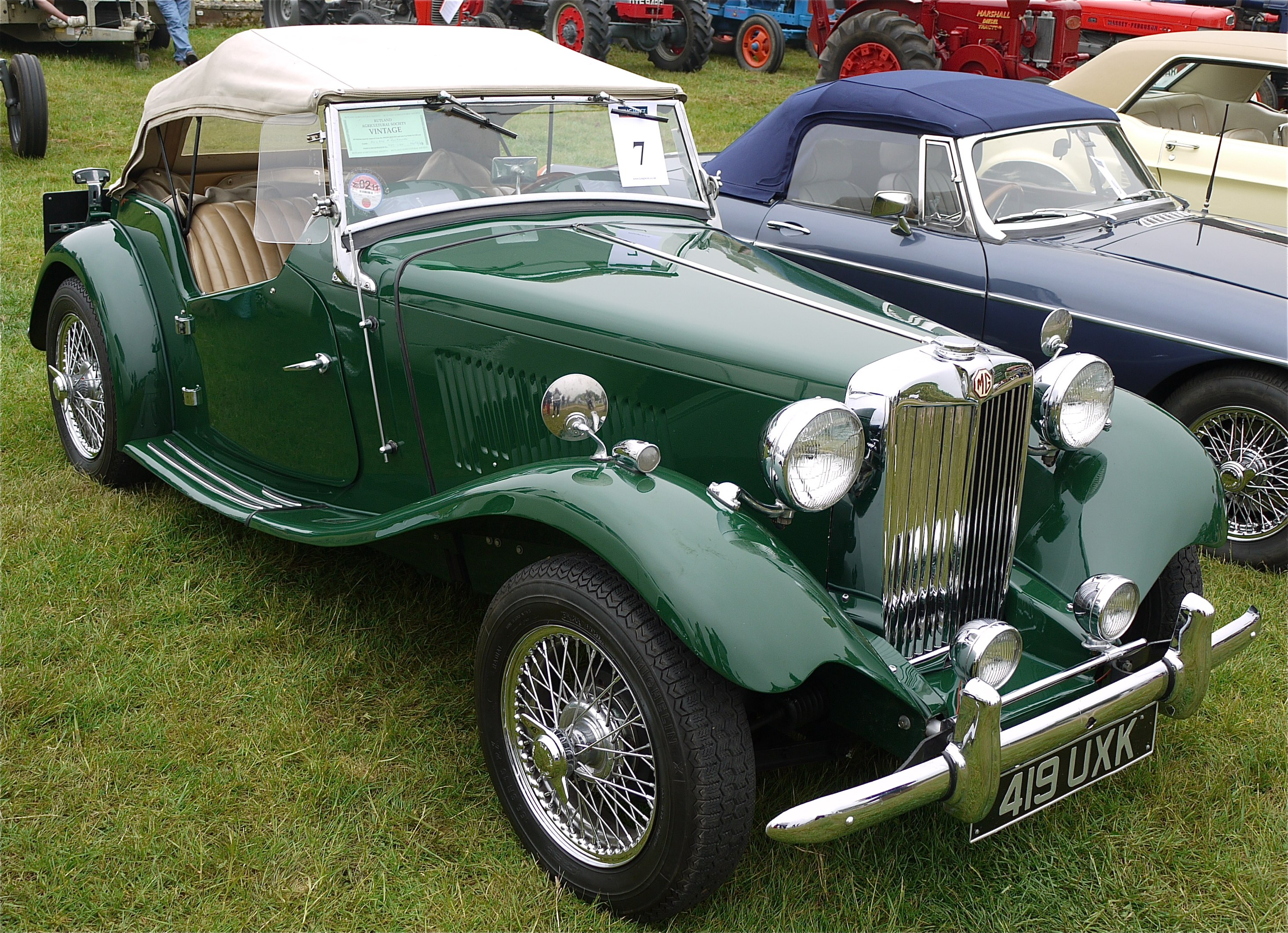
MG TD
1250 cc
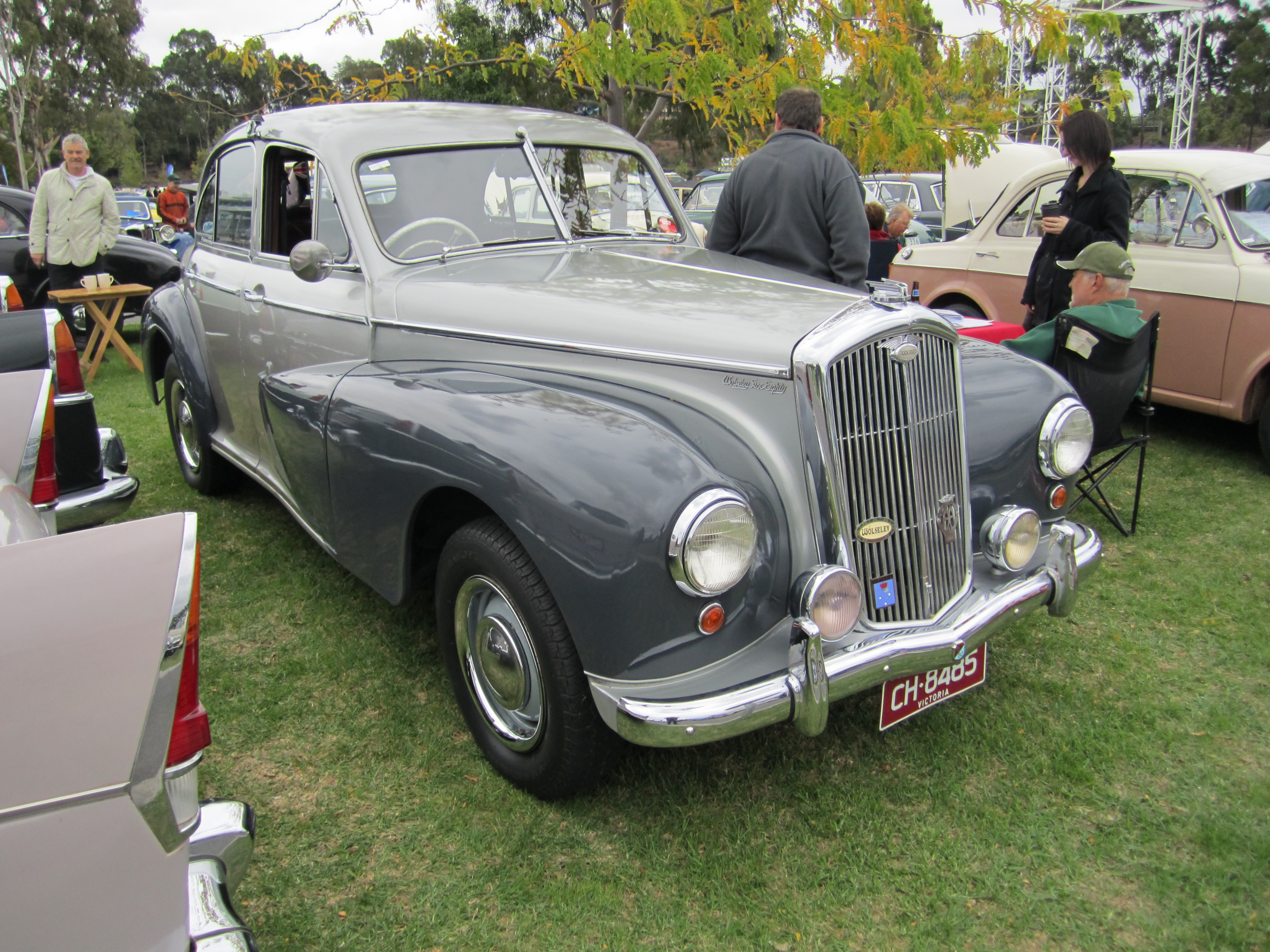
Wolseley 6/80
2215 cc

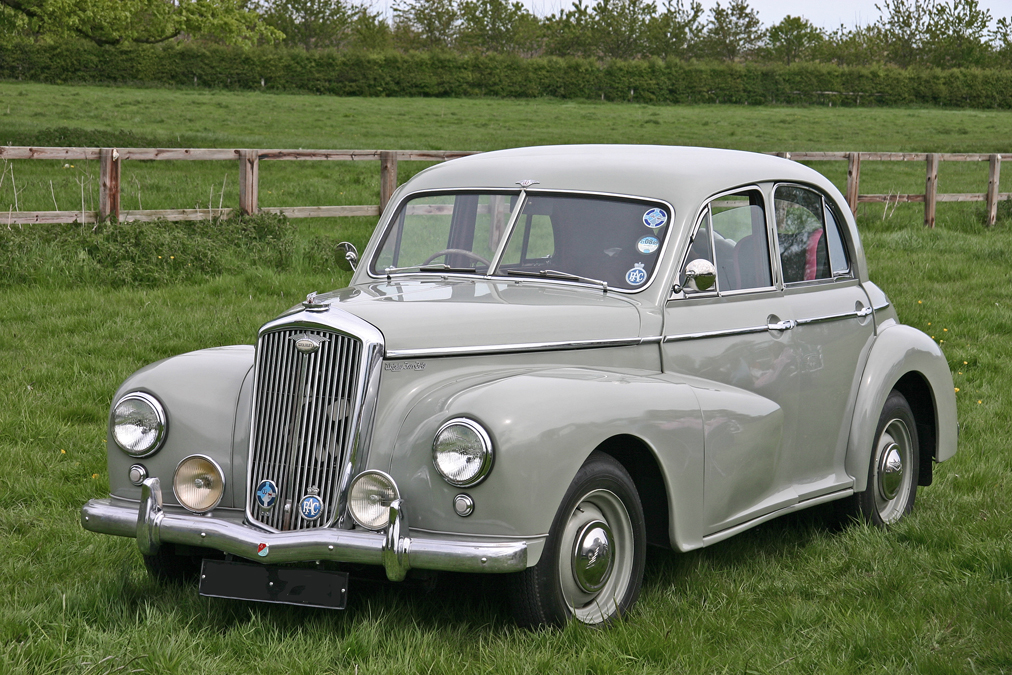
Wolseley 4/50
1476 cc

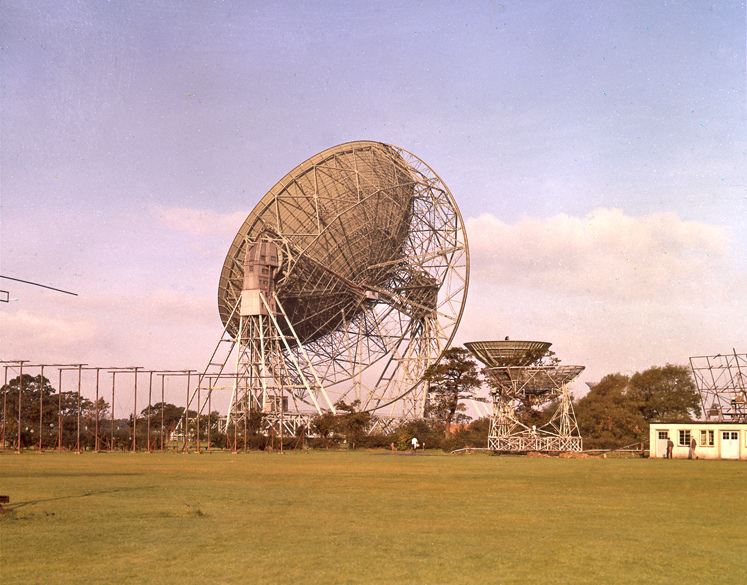
Nuffield Radio Astronomy Laboratories Jodrell Bank

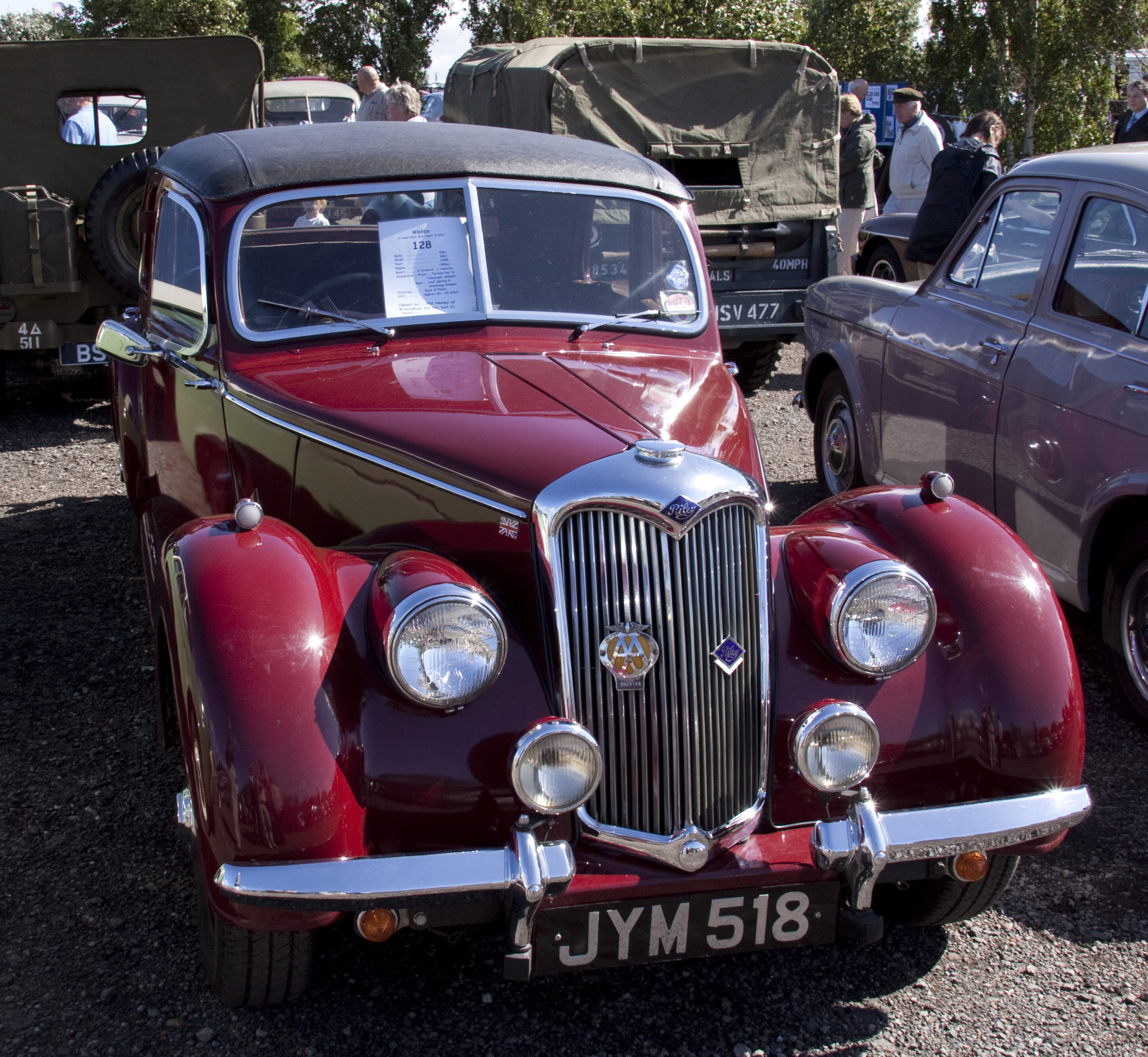
Riley RMA 1½ Litre
1496 cc

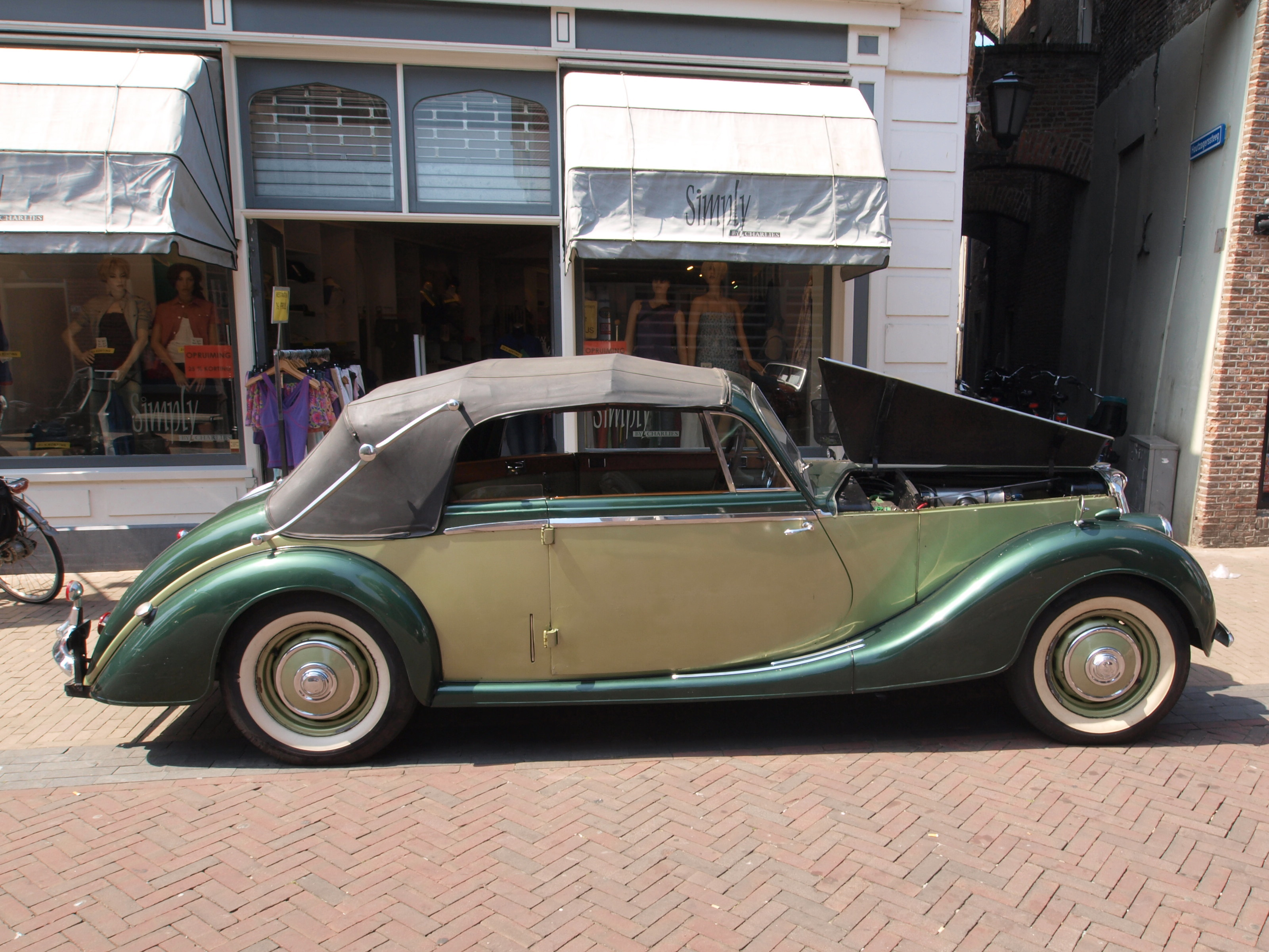
Riley RMB 2½ Litre
2443 cc

The matrix of images shows the links between the models.

- The four images on the left hand side are the mid-size and large Morrises with the matching Wolseleys beneath them.
- The four images on the right hand side are two MGs — sharing one engine used in two bodies and two Rileys — two different engines sharing one body
- The long-lived Morris Minor is top centre and Lovell Telescope at Jodrell Bank, to which Lord Nuffield provided part of the funding.

The specialist MGs and Rileys were to be the last of their separate-chassis line — except for the MG Midget TF and MGA, which latter lasted until the monocoque MG MGB of 1962. The bigger Morris and Wolseley cars shared an identical monocoque structure aft of their engine compartments and almost all mechanicals, the Minor's structure was a smaller version of the same monocoque design.

However, on Friday 23 November 1951 a joint statement announced plans for a merger. The two companies would retain their separate identities and would not produce the same models. Forty years later the merger was recognised to have been a political decision in the face of American competition and the absence of heirs for either Morris or Austin.

== British Motor Corporation ==
Morris Motors Limited merged with The Austin Motor Company Limited in The British Motor Corporation Limited in 1952. The two groups were very evenly matched, not only in financial terms, each had produced and sold in the previous year an almost identical number of vehicles.

By an agreement between the Nuffield and Austin groups announced in November 1951 a new company was incorporated in February 1952 and named The British Motor Corporation Limited. On 29 February 1952 it offered to buy all the shares in Morris Motors Limited giving in exchange shares in BMC.

Holders of the ordinary shares in either Morris or Austin received the same number of new ordinary shares in BMC. Holders of preferred shares, because of the four different classes in Austin's capital received various apportionments of new 5% cumulative preference shares related to their market valuations. If BMC's offer had been accepted in full the capital of BMC would have been £9.2 million in preference shares with £4.8 million in ordinary shares. The effective date for exchange of the shares was to be 31 March 1952.

On 10 April 1952 it was announced that sufficient acceptances had been received to satisfy the conditions of the offer of 29 February.

The first published balance sheet of BMC, 31 July 1952 showed:

Current assets £54.8 million
Current liabilities £28.0 million

Net current assets £26.8 million
Fixed assets £17.5 million
Issued capital and reserves £44.3 million

On 8 September 1952 the British Motor Corporation advertised that it included:

- Morris Motors Limited
- Morris Commercial Cars Limited
- Nuffield (Australia) Pty Limited
- Nuffield Exports Limited
- Nuffield Metal Products Limited
- Riley Motors Limited
- The M.G. Car Company Limited
- The S.U. Carburetter Company Limited
- Wolseley Motors Limited

as well as:

- The Austin Motor Company Limited
- Austin Motor Export Corporation Limited
- The Austin Finance Company Limited
- Vanden Plas (England) 1923 Limited
- The Austin Motor Company (Canada) Limited
- The Austin Motor Company Limited (England)
- The Austin Motor Company (Australia) Limited
- The Austin Motor Company (South Africa) (Proprietary) Limited
- The Austin Motor Company (Rhodesia) Limited

== Continuing identity ==
The Nuffield Organization and its members retained their individual identities until the formation of British Leyland.

== See also ==
- Nuffield Health
