= Morris Motors =

British automotive company

Morris Motors Limited
- Industry: Automotive
- Founded: 1912 W.R.M. Motors; 1919 renamed as Morris Motors
- Founder: William Richard Morris
- Defunct: Brand name used until 1984
- Fate: Individual identity retained until 1968; Ownership merged with Austin in 1952 as subsidiaries of The British Motor Corporation Limited
- Successor: The British Motor Corporation Limited
- Headquarters: Cowley, Oxford, Oxfordshire, later Longbridge England, UK
- Key people: Frank George Woollard; Leonard Lord
- Products: Cars
- Subsidiaries: Morris Commercial Cars Limited; Nuffield Acceptances Limited; Nuffield (Australia) Limited; Nuffield Exports Limited; Nuffield Mechanizations Limited; Nuffield Metal Products Limited; The Nuffield Press Limited; Nuffield Tools and Gauges Limited, Riley (Coventry) Limited; Riley Motors Limited; The M.G. Car Company Limited; The S.U. Carburetter Company Limited; Wolseley Motors Limited

Morris marque
- Product type: Automotive
- Current owner: SAIC
- Discontinued: 1984
- Previous owners: W. R. Morris (1912–1952); BMC (1952–1968); British Leyland (1968–1986); Rover Group (1986–1988); BAe (1988–1994); BMW (1994–2000); MG Rover Group (2000–2005); NAC (2005–2007)

Morris Motors Limited was a British motor vehicle manufacturing company formed in 1919 to take over the assets of William Morris's WRM Motors Limited and continue production of the same vehicles. By 1926, its production accounted for 42 per cent of British car manufacture—a remarkable rate of expansion attributed to William Morris's practice of buying in major as well as minor components and assembling them in his own factory.

Although it merged with Austin Motor Company to form the British Motor Corporation (Note: ... although nearly twenty-five years had elapsed since the BMC merger, not even Austin and Morris, the two volume car manufacturers that formed the core of the original merger, had integrated to a significant degree. Stokes illustrated the immensity of the problem posed by the merger in 1968 by referring to the former Austin and Morris companies as 'scarcely on speaking terms'. Sixteen years after the formation of BMC, like the other former Nuffield companies and Jaguar, each possessed its own management systems, approaches, and methods, and, like the other companies in the group, was 'running on their own'. H. C. Reports, Accounts and Papers, XXV, Fourteenth Report of the Expenditure Committee, Minutes of Evidence (1974–75), Vol. II, q. 2171 quoted in Historical foundations of Corporate culture: British Leyland, its predecessors and Ford. Roy Church. Business history and business culture. Edited by Andrew Godley, Oliver M. Westall, Manchester University Press, 1996) in 1952, the Morris name remained in use until 1984, when the by-then Austin Rover Group decided to concentrate on the more popular Austin brand as well as expanding the more upmarket Rover brand.

Until 2014, Morris Oxford vehicles (based on the 1954-59 Oxford) were manufactured in India by Hindustan Motors with periodic enhancements, and sold well there, even being imported to Britain in small numbers during the 1990s.

Part of Morris's manufacturing complex at Cowley, Oxford, is now BMW Group's Plant Oxford, factory of the Mini marque since its launch in 2001.

The Morris trademark is currently owned by the China-based automotive company SAIC, which acquired it from the bankrupt subsidiary Nanjing Automotive.

The Morris Commercial JE, an electric van with a 1940s design, was unveiled in November 2019 ahead of a planned 2021 launch under the re-launched Morris Commercial marque, well over 30 years after the Morris brand disappeared.

== History ==
=== Early history ===
WRM Motors Ltd began in 1912 when bicycle manufacturer William Morris moved on from the sale, hire, and repair of cars to car manufacturing. He planned a new light car assembled from bought-in components. In this way he was able to retain ownership by keeping within the bounds of his own capital resources.

A factory was opened in 1913 at former Oxford Military College at Cowley, Oxford, United Kingdom where Morris's first car, the 2-seat Morris Oxford "Bullnose", was assembled. Nearly all the major components were bought in.

In 1914, a coupé and van were added to the line-up, but the Bullnose chassis was too short and the 1018 cc engine too small to make a much-needed 4-seat version of the car. White and Poppe, who made the engine, were unable to supply the volume of units that Morris required, so Morris turned to Continental of Detroit, Michigan for the supply of a 1548 cc engine. Gearboxes and axles were also sourced in the US.

In spite of the outbreak of the First World War the orders were maintained and, from mid-1915 a new larger car, the 2-seat and 4-seat Morris Cowley was introduced.

=== Inter-war years ===
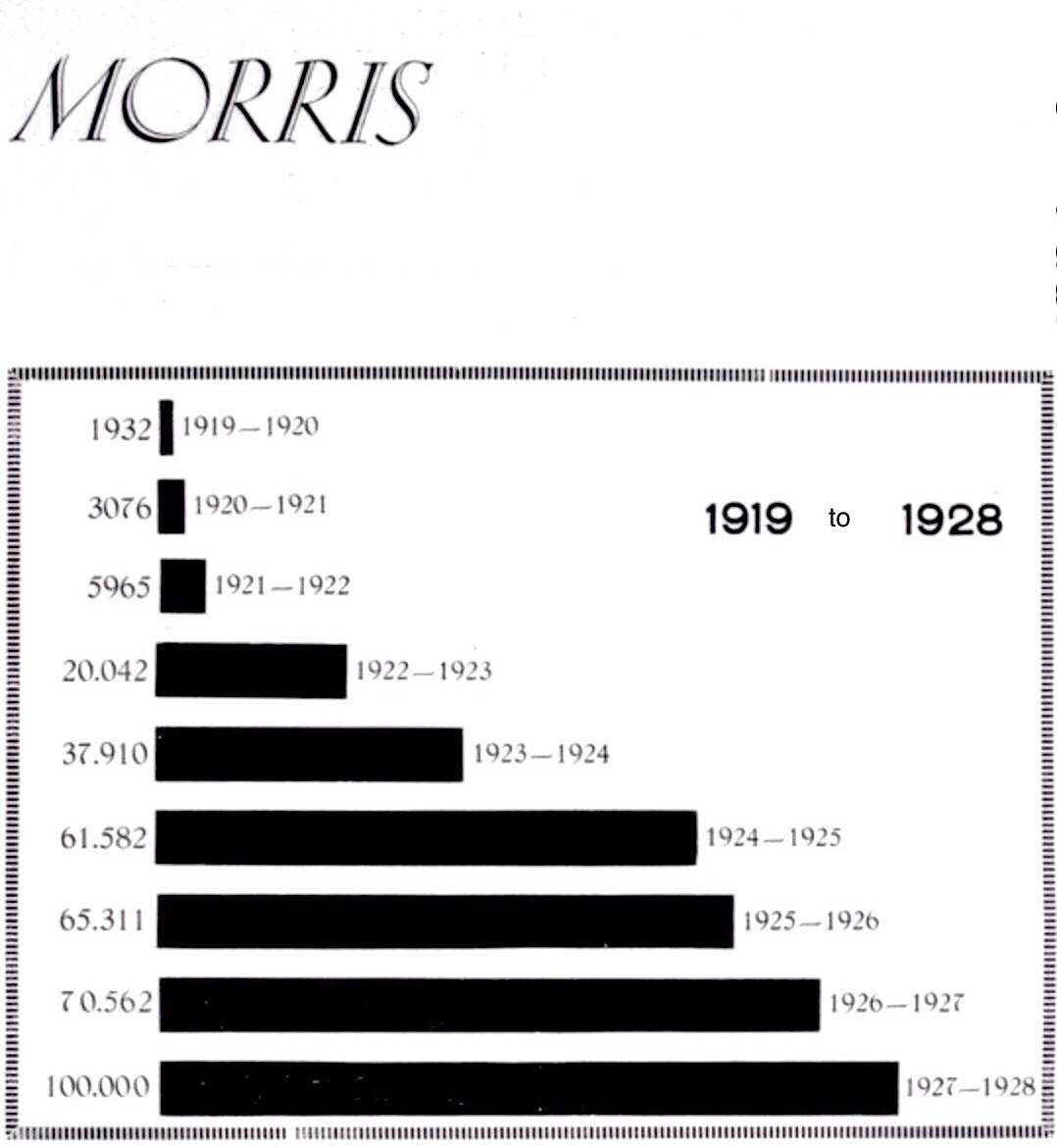
Morris production figures

After the war the Continental engine was no longer available so Morris arranged for Hotchkiss of France to make a near copy in their Coventry factory. This was used to power new versions of the basic Cowley and more up-market Morris Oxford cars.

With a reputation for producing high-quality cars and a policy of cutting prices, Morris's business continued to grow and increase its share of the British market overtaking Ford to become in 1924 the UK's biggest car manufacturer, holding a 51% share of the home market and remaining enormously profitable.

Possessed of a very large cash income Morris had a policy of personally buying up suppliers' businesses. For example, in 1923 he bought Hotchkiss's Coventry business which later became Morris Engines branch. He also brought in F G Woollard which became Morris Commercial Cars to lead the re-organization of their engine production from batch to flow, thus increasing output from less than 300 units per week to 1200. By 1924 the factory was making 2000 units a week with only a small increase in work space and labour force.

Cecil Kimber, head of Morris's own original 1909-founded Morris Garage sales hire and repair operation in Oxford, began building sporting versions of Morris cars in 1924 labelling them MG. They were so successful a separate MG factory was soon established south of Oxford in Abingdon-on-Thames, Berkshire.

Having admired Budd's all-steel bodies Morris founded The Pressed Steel Company of Great Britain Limited in 1926 as a joint venture with Edward G Budd Manufacturing Company - Budd International of Philadelphia, USA. Pressed Steel's factory was located over the road from Morris's factory at Cowley and supplied Morris and many other motor manufacturers. Morris withdrew from the venture in mid-1930. Budd sold their share to British interests at the beginning of 1936.

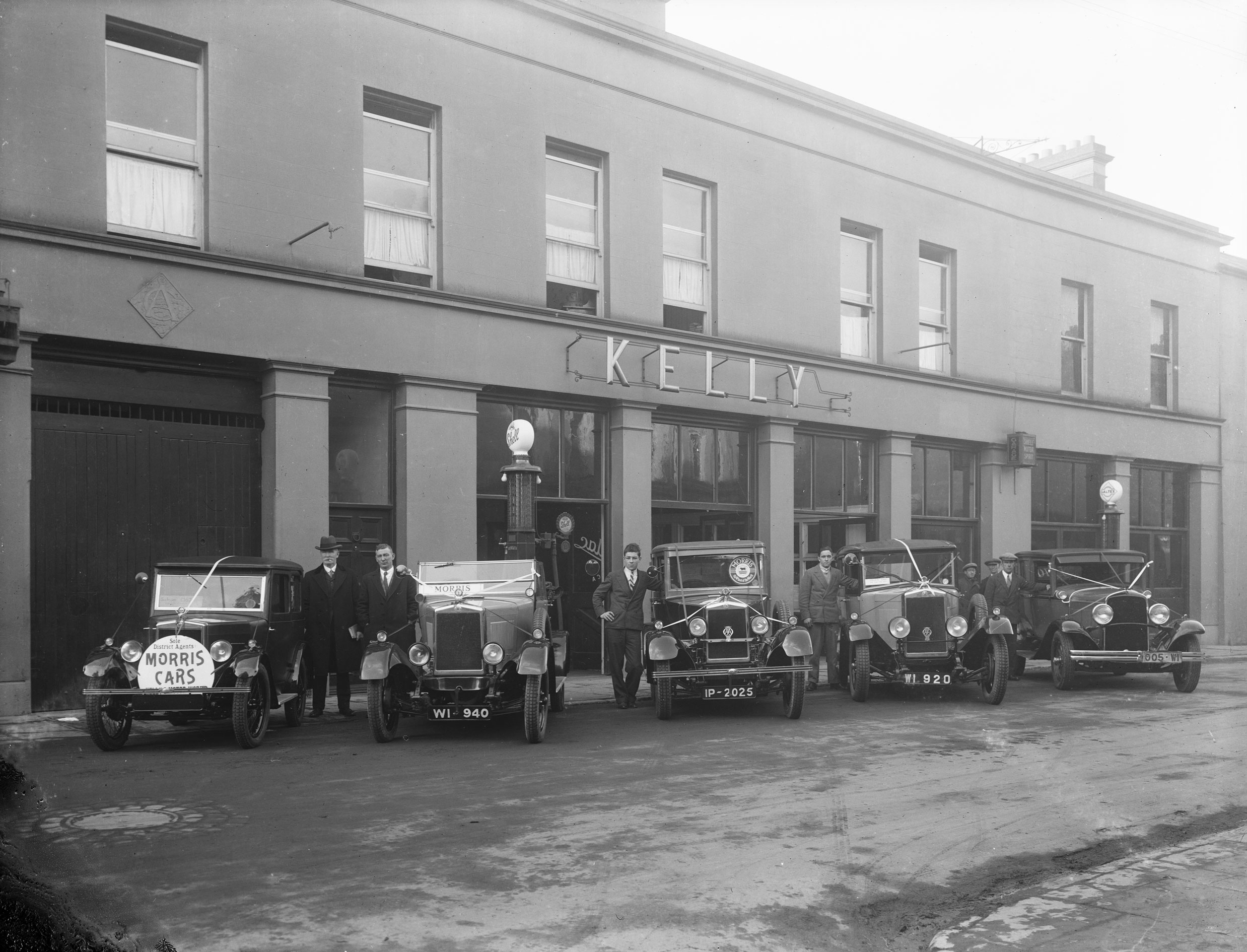
An array of Morris cars on the forecourt of Mr J. Kelly's garage at Catherine Street, Waterford, Ireland, 1928

The small car market was entered in 1928 with the Leonard Lord-designed Morris Minor, using an 847 cc engine from Morris's newly acquired Wolseley Motors. Lord had been sent there to modernise the works and Wolseley's products. The Minor was to provide the base for the MG Midgets. This timely spread into the small car market helped Morris through the economic depression of the 1930s. At the 1934 London Motor Show the Minor was replaced by the Morris Eight, a direct response to the Ford Model Y and, though Leonard Lord's handiwork, heavily based on it.

In 1932 W R Morris appointed Lord Managing Director of Morris Motors Limited and Lord swept through the Morris works, updating the production methods, introducing a proper moving assembly line and creating Europe's largest integrated car plant. But Morris and Lord fell out, and after 15 years Lord left in 1936—threatening to "take Cowley apart brick by brick". Lord moved to Austin and they were to meet again in BMC—Morris, as Lord Nuffield, its first chairman. Lord succeeded him.

As of 1 July 1935 Morris Motors acquired from W R Morris, now Lord Nuffield, in exchange for a further issue of ordinary shares to him, the car manufacturing businesses of Wolseley Motors Limited and The MG Car Company Limited. A separate private company, Wolseley Aero Engines Limited, was then formed to continue the development of his aviation interests. In 1936 Lord Nuffield sold Morris Commercial Cars Limited, his commercial vehicle enterprise, to Morris Motors.

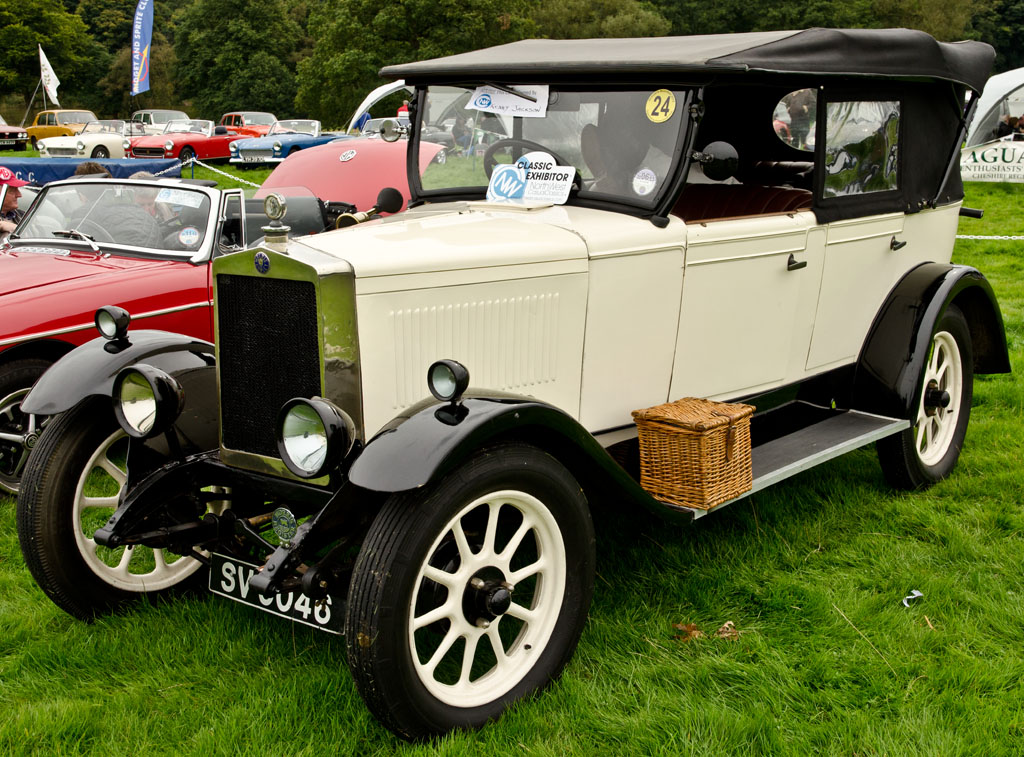
1925 Morris—42 per cent of production

Car production in Britain 1919–1938 (per cent)
	1919	1920	1921	1922	1923	1924	1925	1926	1927	1929	1932	1935	1938
Morris cars produced until August 31		357	2,927	5,156	17,286	27,551	48,717	~ 56,000	~ 60.000				
Morris	2		10		28		42		37	35	33	31	23
Austin			7		8		10		23	25	27	23	21
Ford			22		11		2		6	4	6	17	18
Rootes, Standard, Vauxhall										8	23	23	31

In 1938 William Morris, Baron Nuffield was raised to Viscount Nuffield. The same year he transferred his newly acquired Riley car business to Morris Motors Limited for £100.

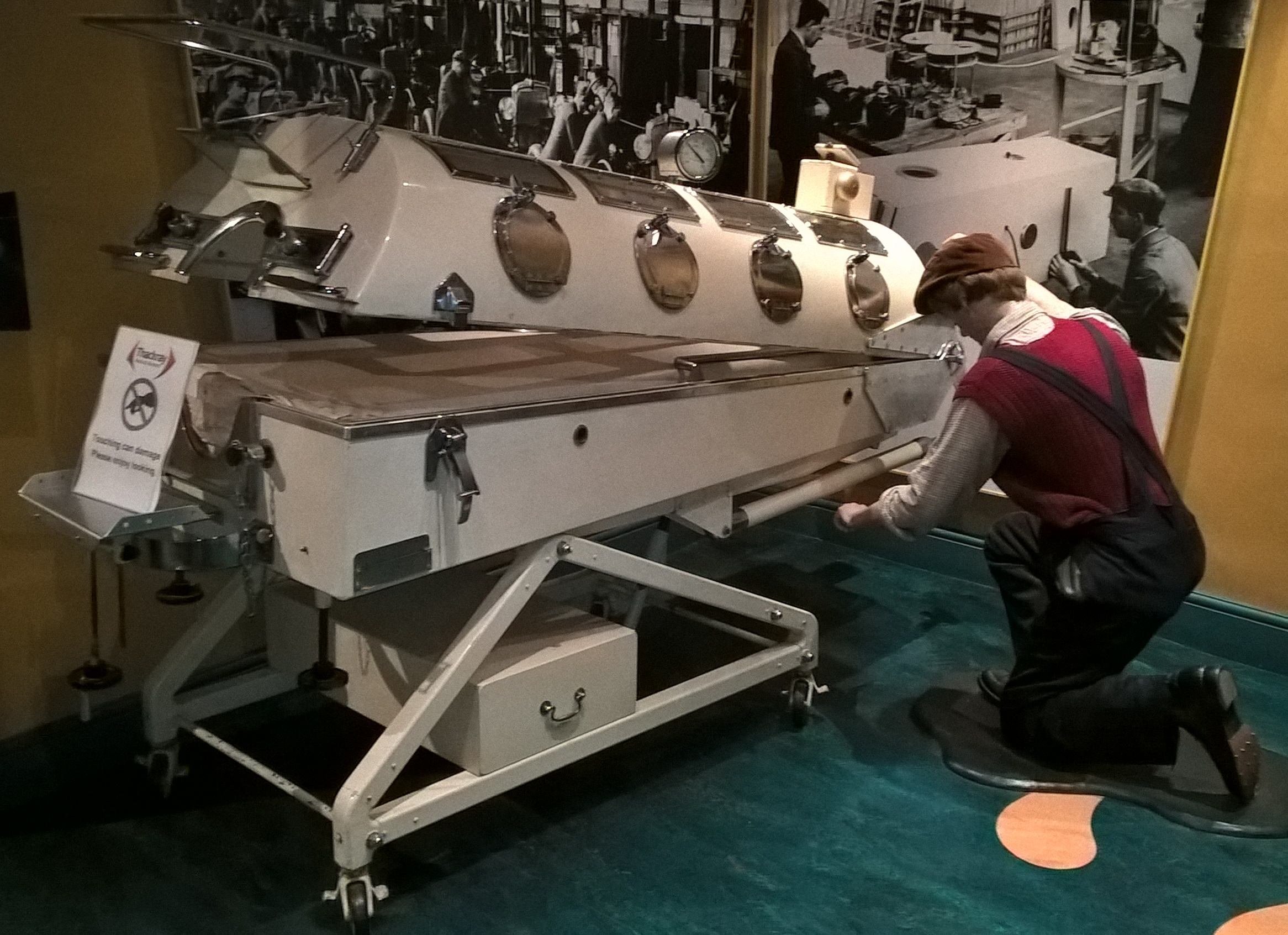
Diorama of Both-Nuffield iron lung assembly at Morris Motors Thackray Medical Museum, Leeds

=== Iron lung ===
Visiting London in 1938 during a polio epidemic Lord Nuffield saw a Both Iron Lung in use. He commissioned an improved design which could be produced using the techniques of car assembly and arranged production of approximately 1700 machines at the Cowley works, which he donated to hospitals throughout all parts of Britain and the British Empire.

Both-Nuffield respirators were able to be produced by the thousand at about one-thirteenth the cost of the American design.

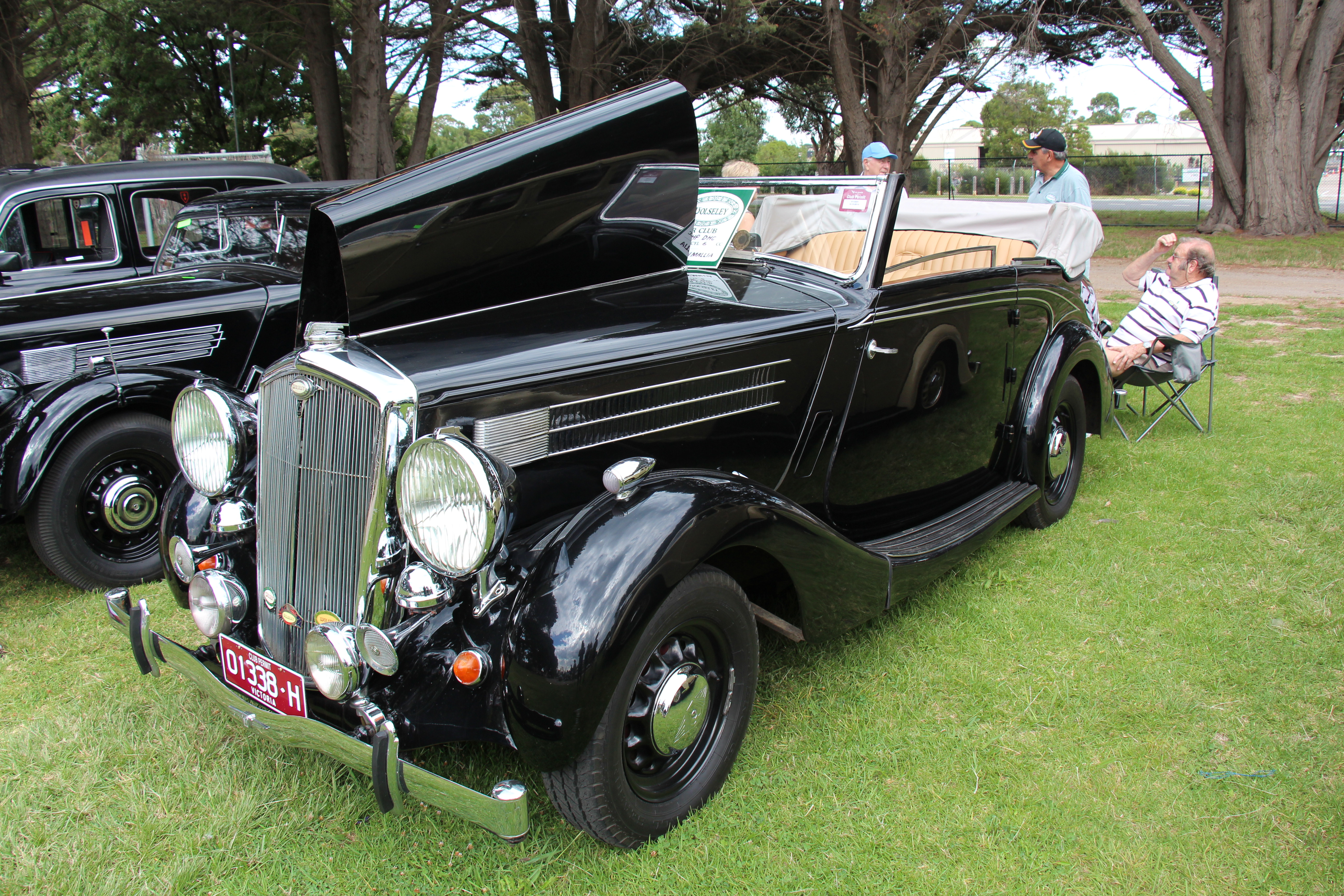
1936 Wolseley

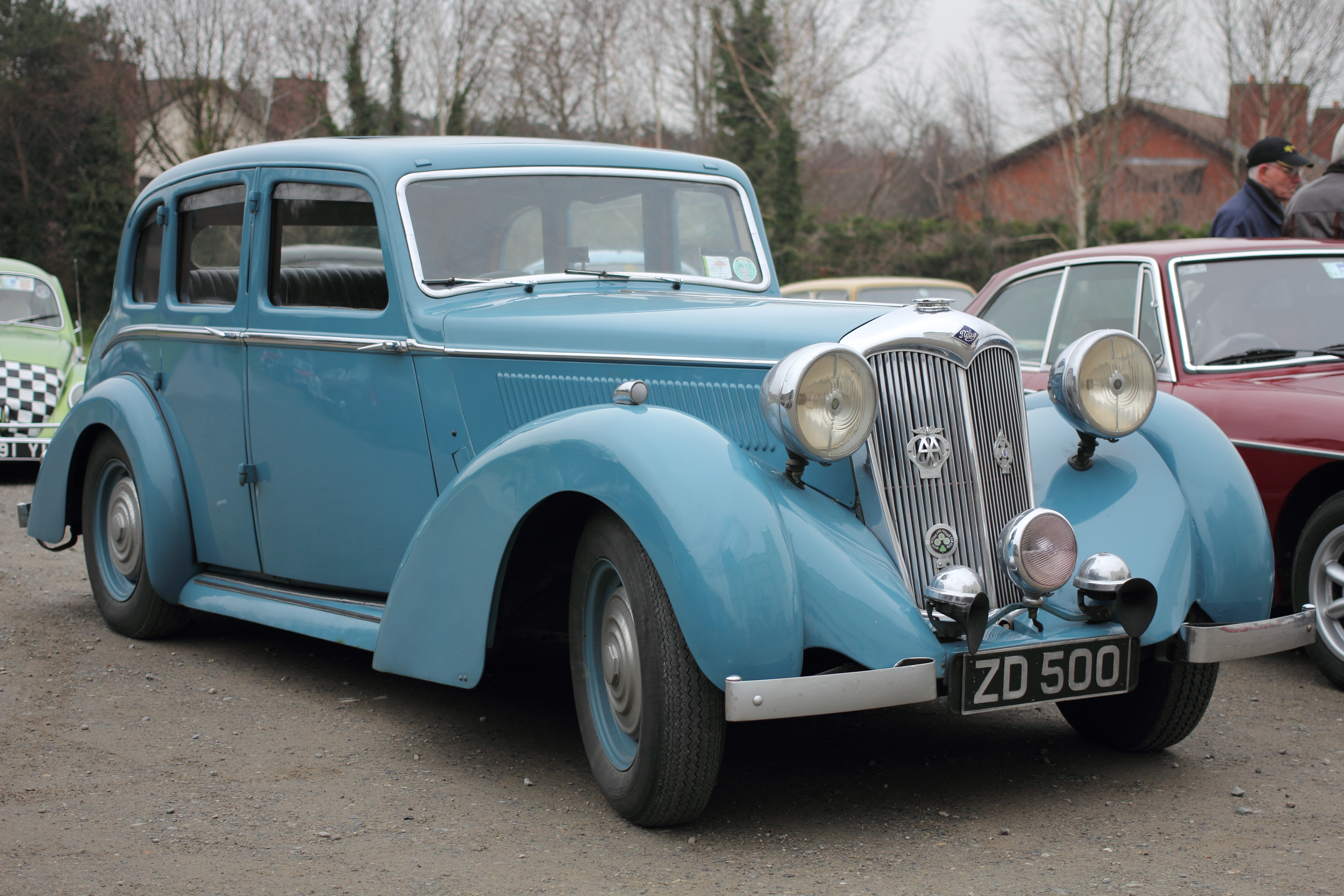
1939 Riley

=== Significant subsidiaries ===
Subsidiary	founded or acquired by W R Morris, Viscount Nuffield	acquired by Morris Motors Limited
W R Morris	1912	1926
Morris Engines	1923	1926
Morris Commercial	1923	1936
MG	1924	1935
Nuffield Press	1925	
Pressed Steel	1926	never, but acquired by BMC in 1965
SU	1926	1926
Wolseley	1927	1935
Nuffield Mechanizations	1935	WWII
Riley	1938	1938

=== Second World War ===
In the summer of 1938 Morris agreed to build, equip and manage at government expense a huge new factory at Castle Bromwich specifically to manufacture Supermarine Spitfires. with intention to build bombers later. Nuffield's management failed; no Spitfires were delivered by May 1940 despite expectation of 60 a day. The Ministry of Aircraft Production took over the plant putting in managers from Supermarine and placing it under Vickers-Armstrongs (of which Supermarine was a part) supervision. After a major air raid damaged the Morris Bodies factory, the premises switched to the production of jerry cans, producing millions of these versatile containers for use during the rest of the war and following the ending of hostilities. The Cowley plant was turned over to aircraft repair and production of Tiger Moth pilot trainers, as well as "mine sinkers" based on a design produced at the same plant during the First World War.

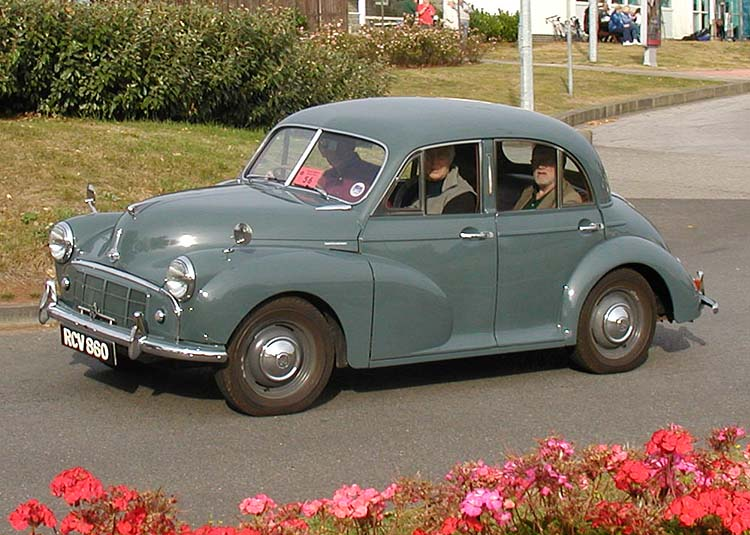
The Morris Minor was one of the most popular cars from Morris.

Morris produced the popular Morris C8 Quad artillery prime mover towing artillery (such as the 25-pounder) and anti-tank guns (such as the 17-pounder) with some 10,200 made. Morris also produced some 2200 Morris Light Reconnaissance Cars, 100 Morris CS9 armoured cars, 21,319 Morris CS8 15cwt light trucks, the Morris C4 truck, Morris ML ambulance, 500 Morris Commercial 8x8 GS Terrapin (amphibious vehicle)s, and the Morris Commercial CD series trucks.

=== Post-Second World War production ===
Production restarted after the Second World War, with the pre-war Eight and Ten designs. In 1948 the Eight was replaced by what is probably the most famous Morris car, the Morris Minor designed by Alec Issigonis (who later went on to design the Mini) and reusing the small car name from 1928. The Ten was replaced by a new 1948 Morris Oxford MO, styled like a larger version of the Minor. A later Morris Oxford (the 1956 Morris Oxford III) was the basis for the design of India's Hindustan Ambassador, which continued in production until 2014.

The nine different cars made by Morris Motors and its wholly owned subsidiaries at the time of the formation of BMC
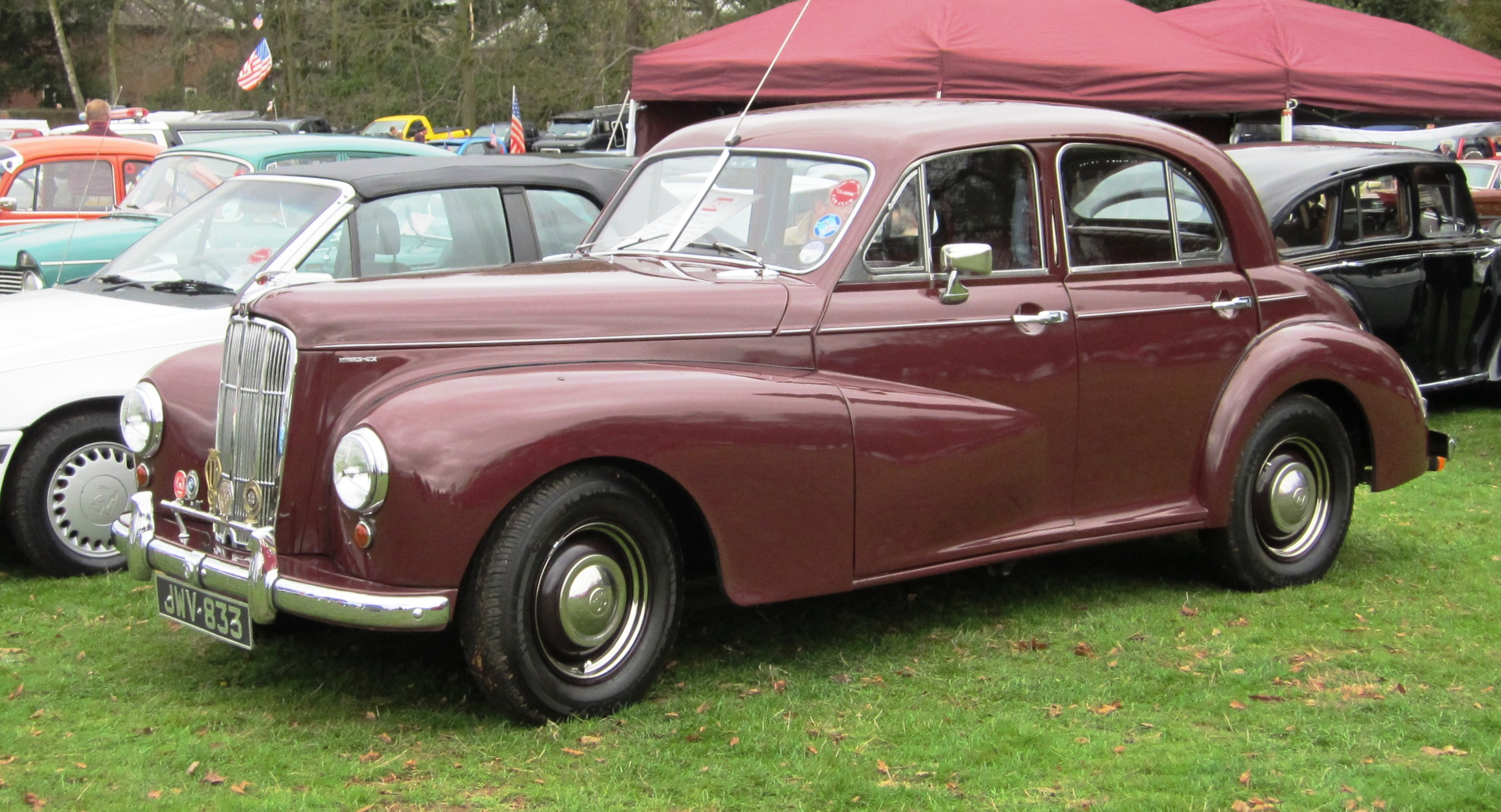
Morris Six
2215 cc

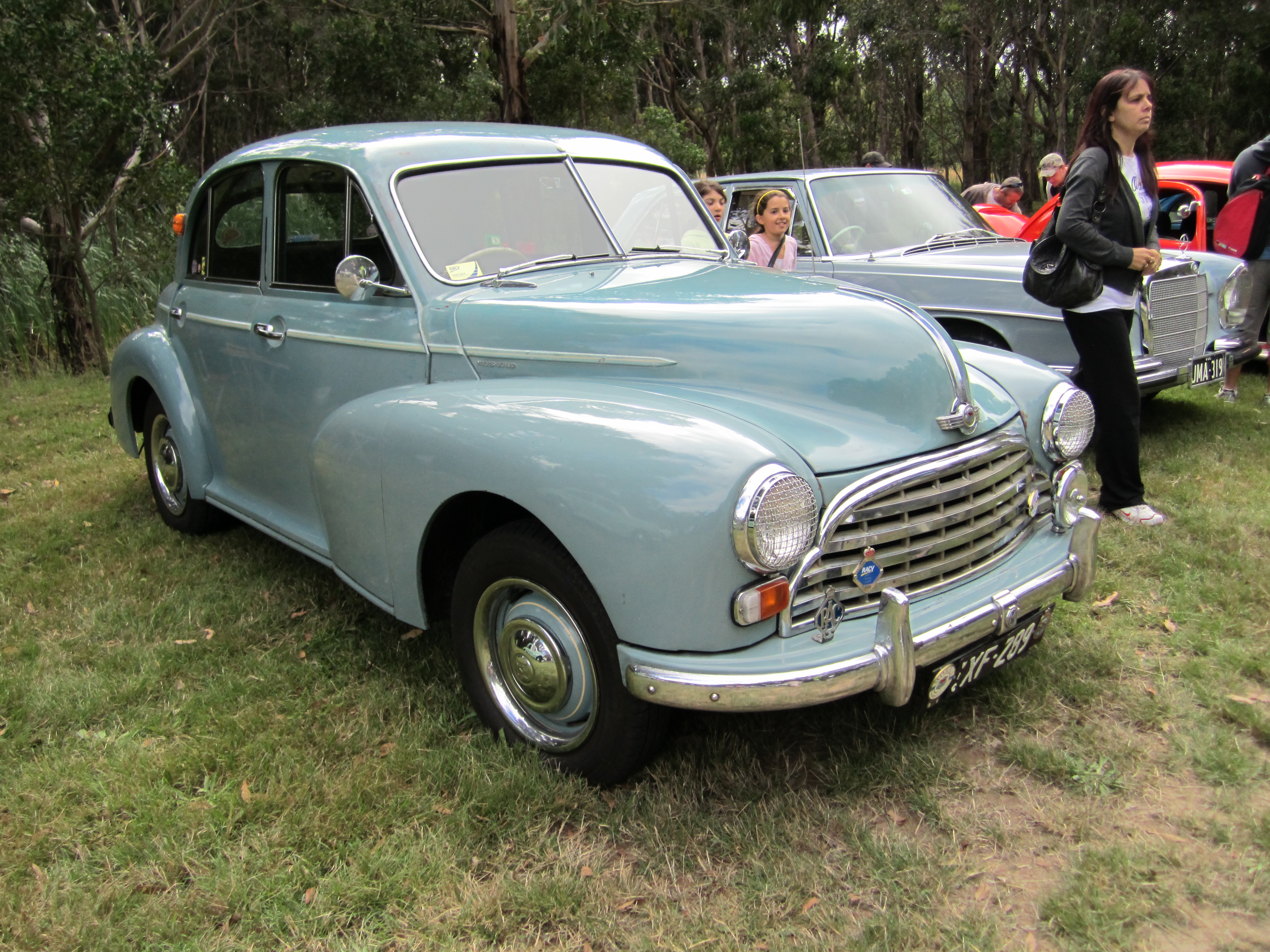
Morris Oxford
1476 cc

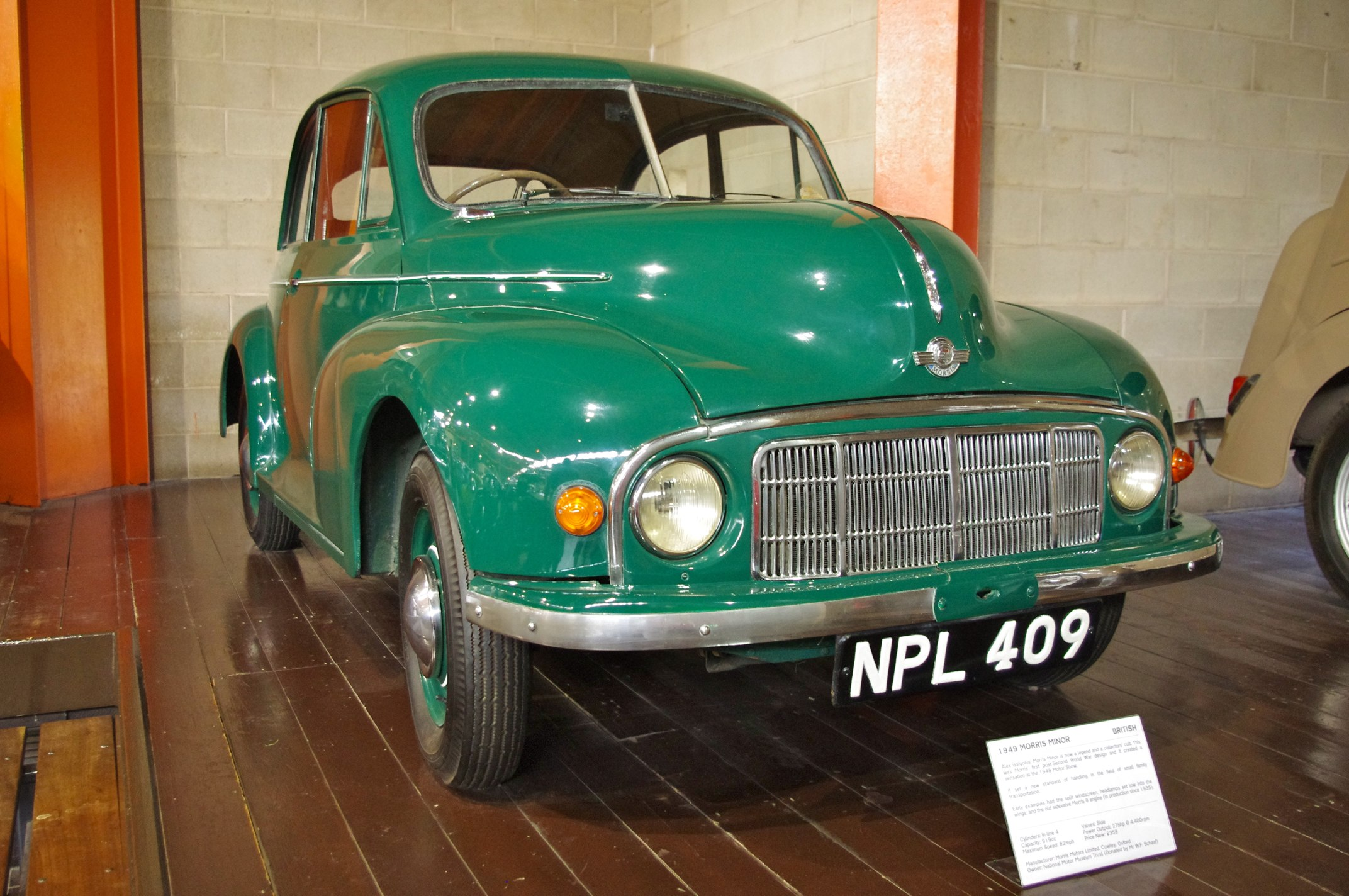
Morris Minor
918 cc

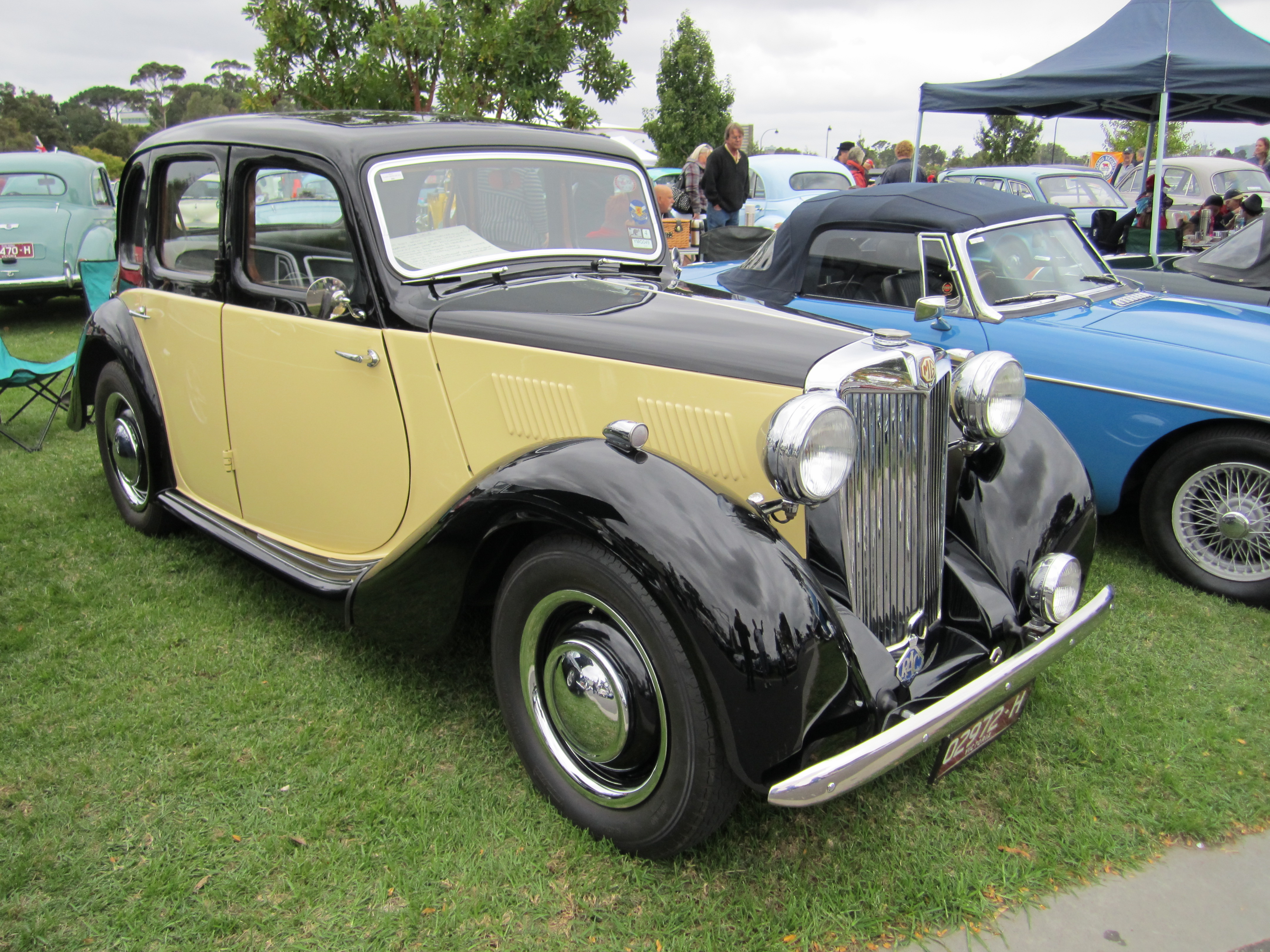
M.G. 1¼-litre
1250 cc

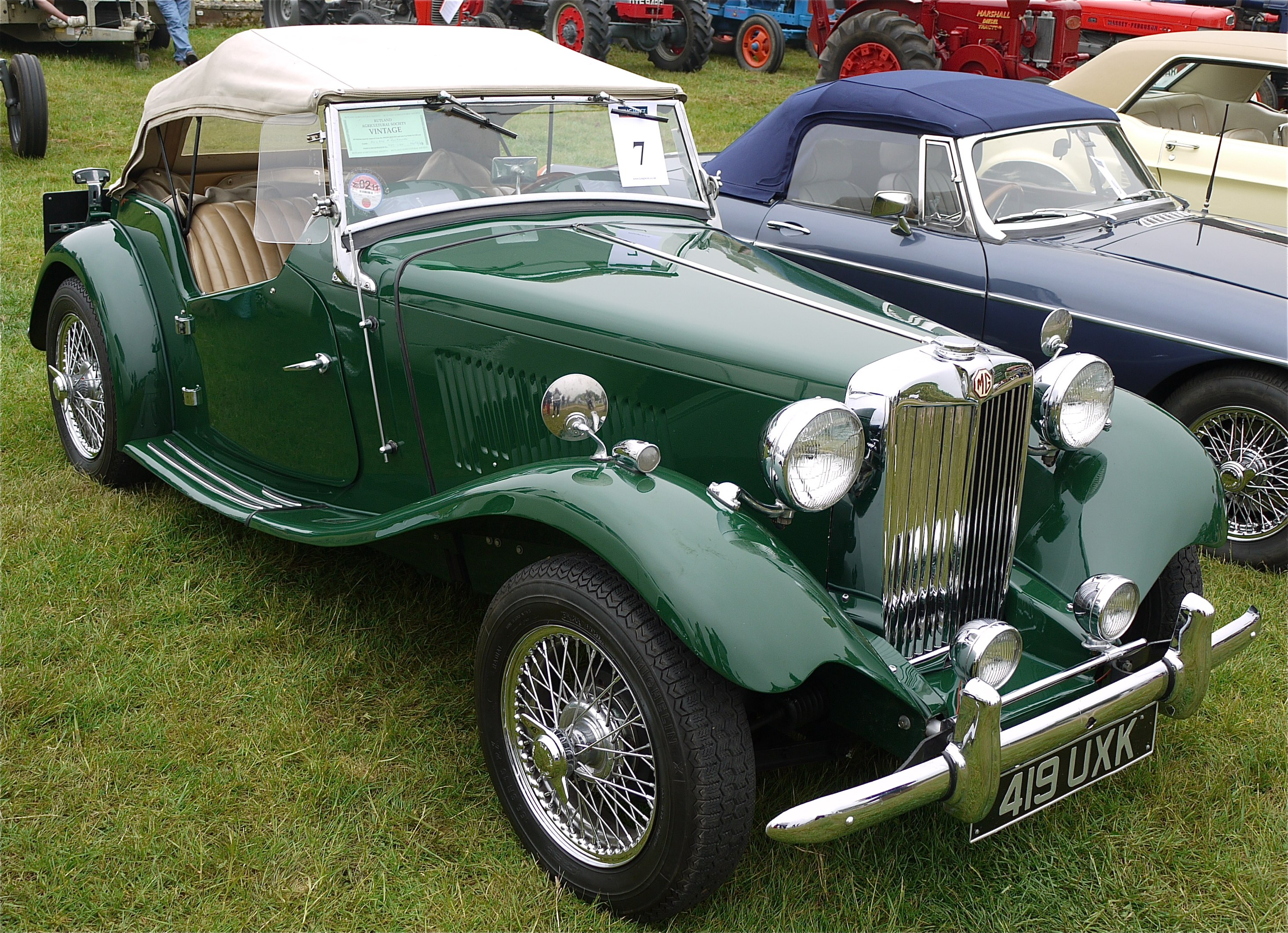
MG TD Midget
1250 cc
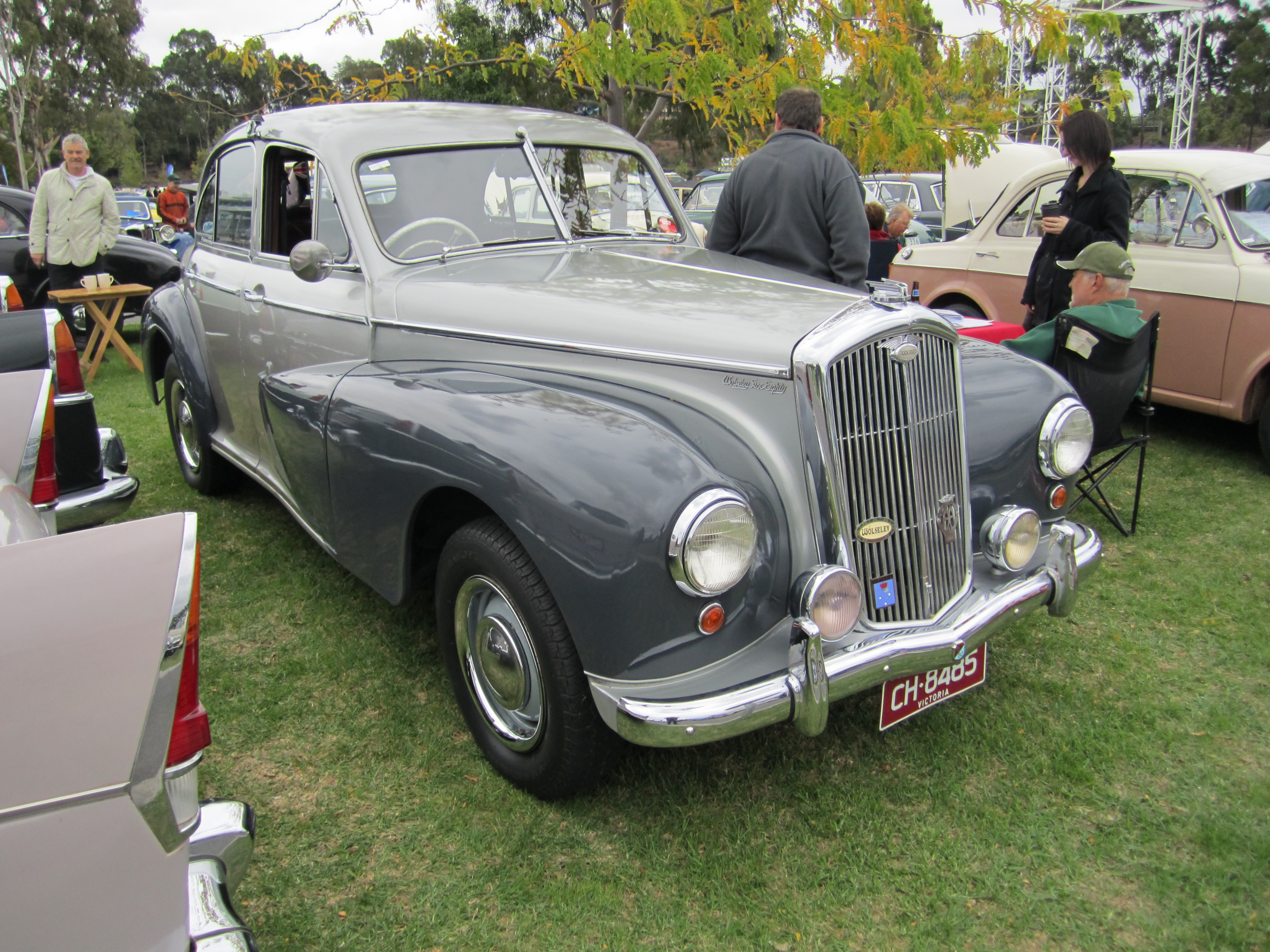
Wolseley 6/80
2215 cc

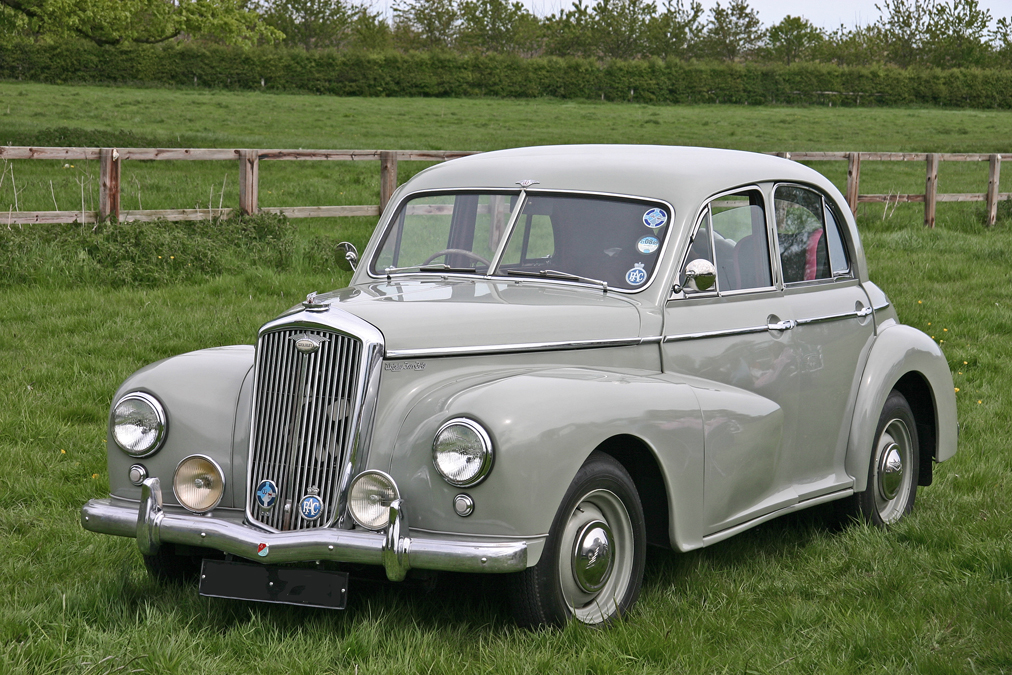
Wolseley 4/50
1476 cc
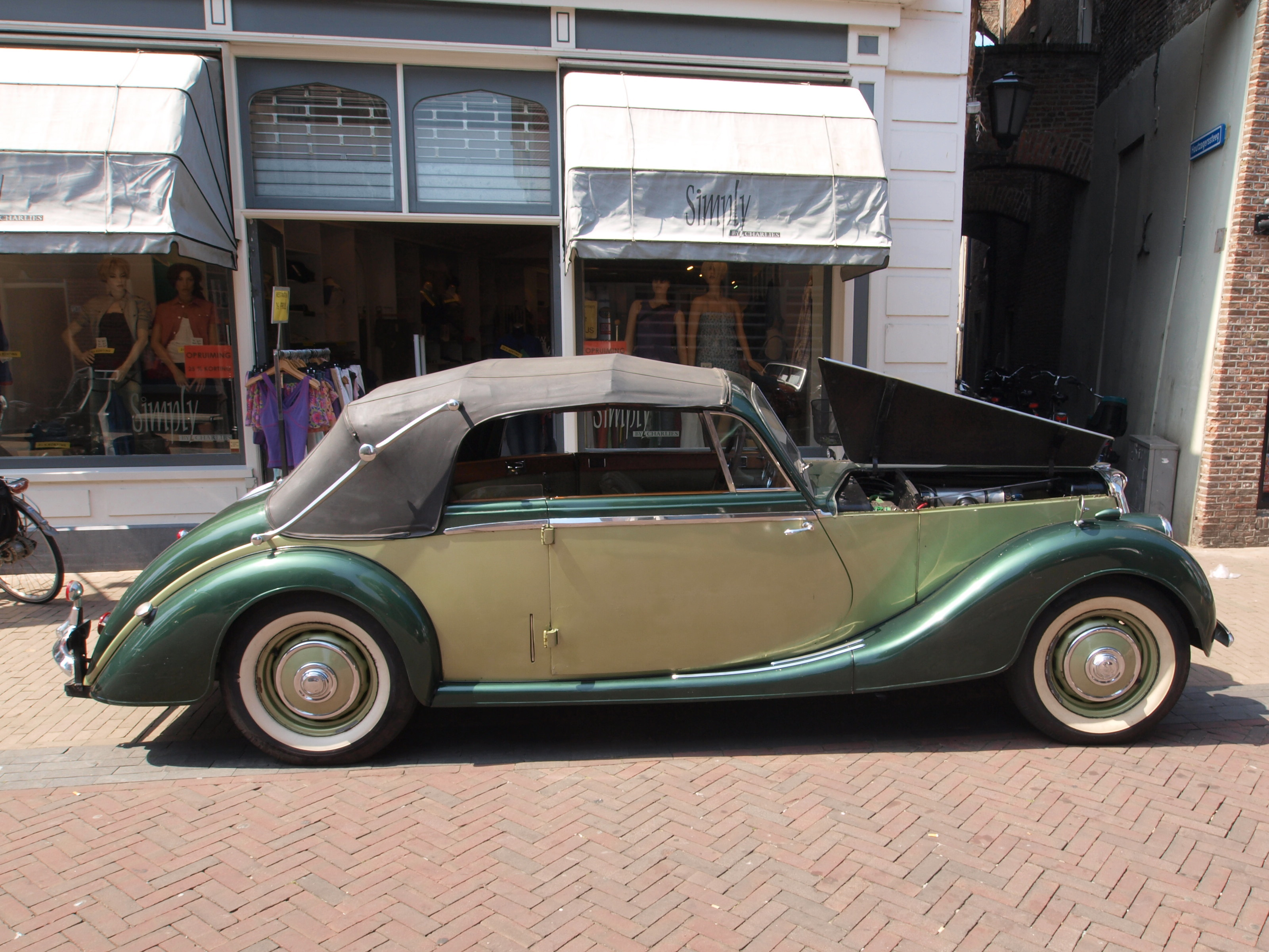
Riley 2½-litre
2443 cc

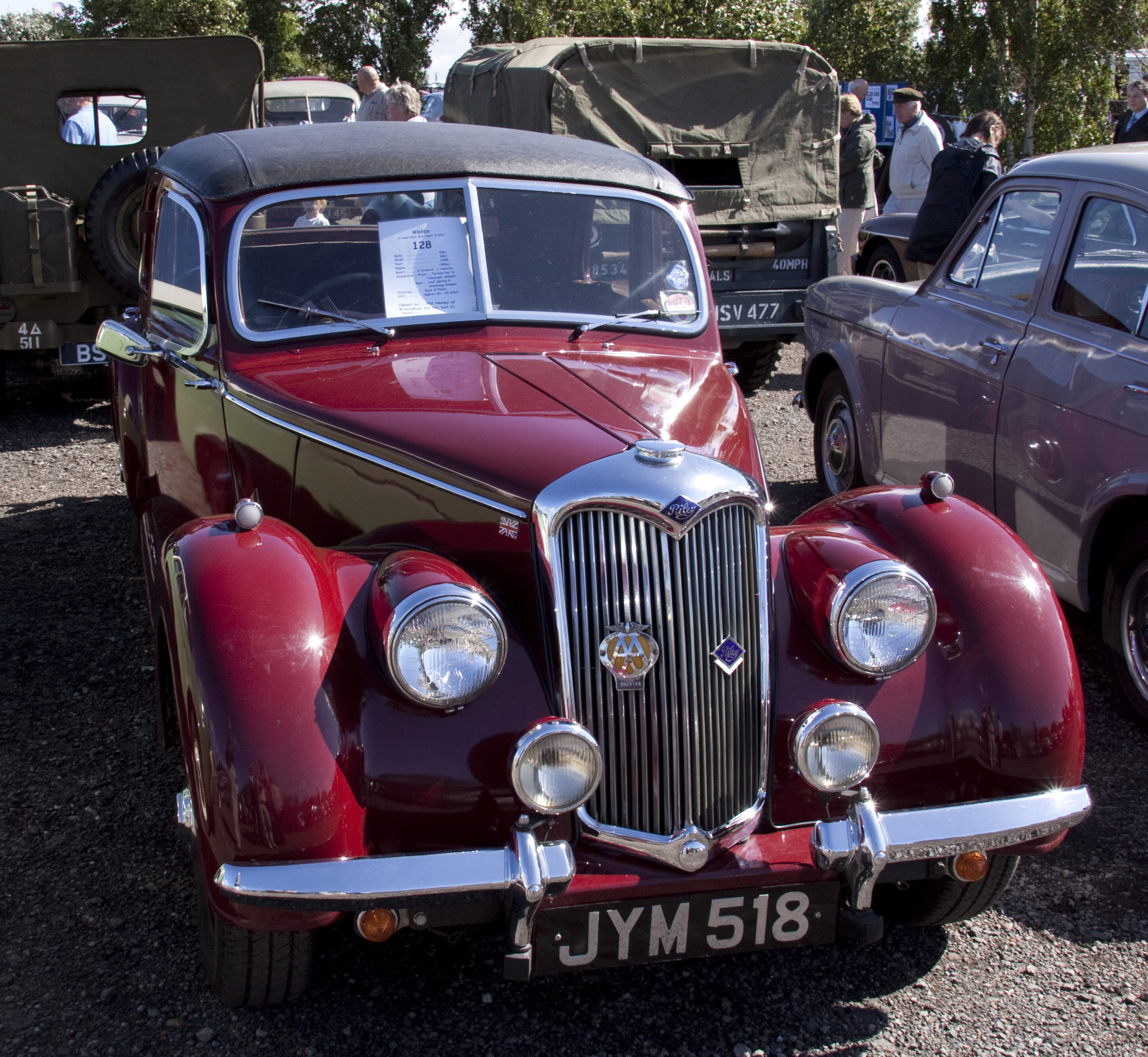
Riley 1½-litre
1496 cc

They used six engines and five (and a half) car bodies, of which the "specialist" three were obsolescent, the rest very closely related if not identical.

=== BMC ===
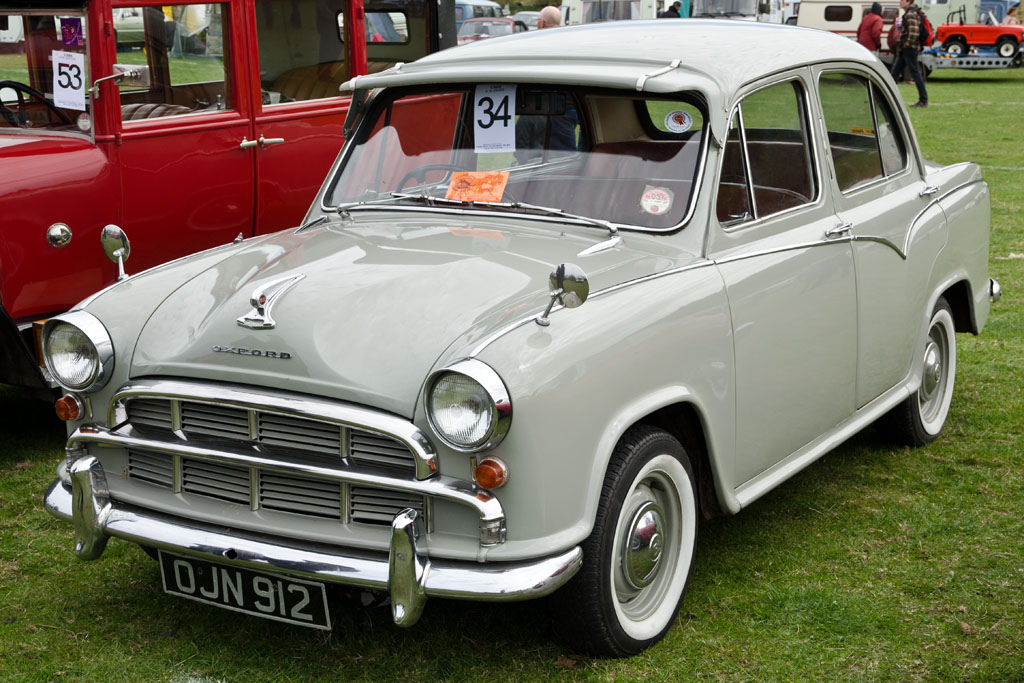
The Morris Oxford Series III, launched in 1955–56, only had a short production run in the UK, but it was manufactured in India as the Hindustan Ambassador by Hindustan Motors with periodic changes till 2014.

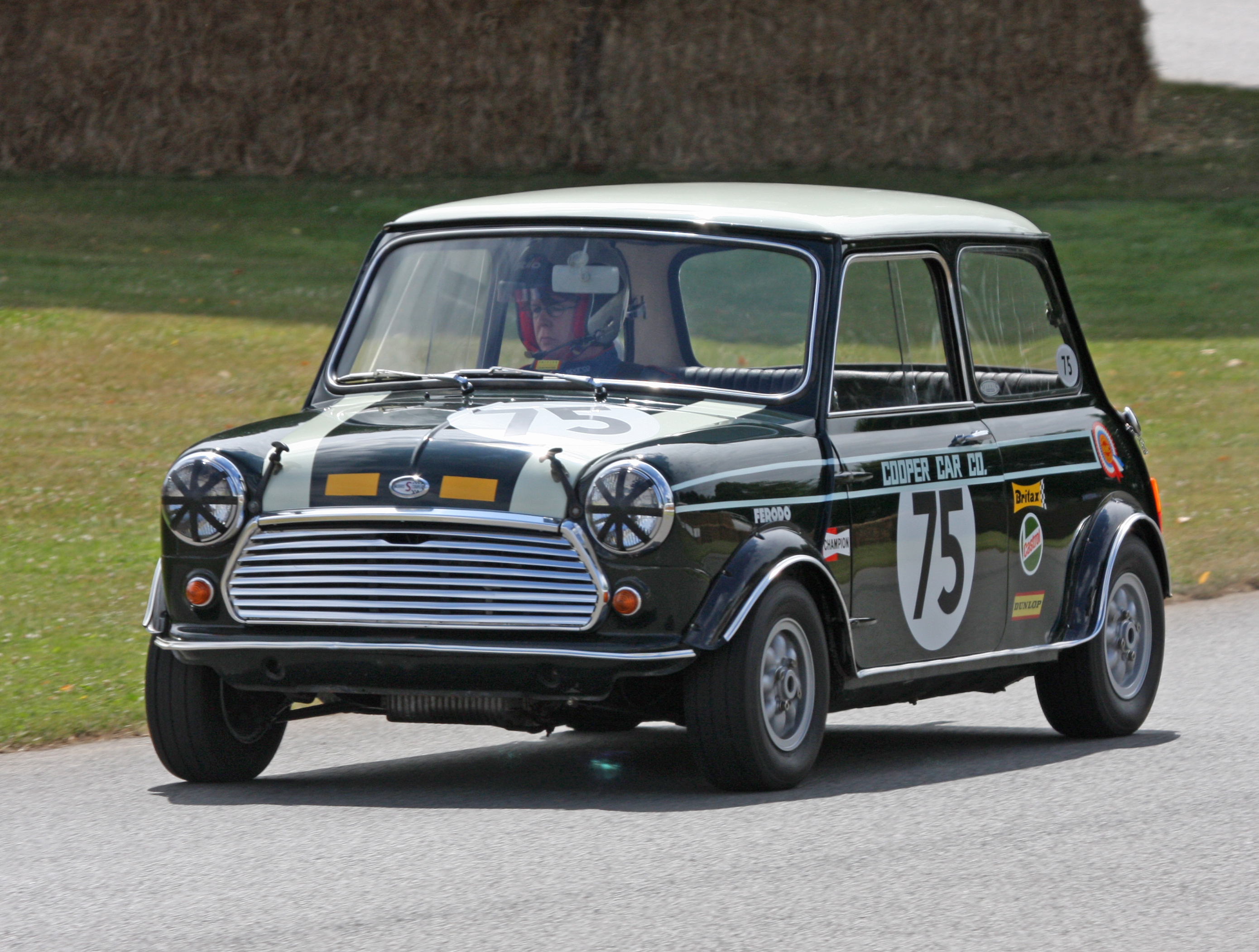
The Morris Mini launched in 1959 would influence a whole new generation into small cars. The Mini was produced until 2000.

In 1952 the Nuffield Organization merged with its old rival the Austin Motor Company to form the British Motor Corporation (BMC). Nuffield brought the Morris, MG, Riley and Wolseley marques into the merger. Leonard Lord was in charge, which led to Austin's domination of the organisation. Badge-engineering was important to BMC and for many years the various marques would be seen on several families of similar vehicles.

=== British Leyland ===
In 1966, BMC acquired Jaguar to create British Motor Holdings (BMH), which subsequently merged with Leyland Motors in 1968 to form the British Leyland Motor Corporation (BLMC), and subsequently, in 1975, the nationalised British Leyland Limited (BL). The Cowley complex remained the second largest single facility in the BL empire (after Longbridge), but BL's history was a turbulent one – BMC was close to financial ruin, and the newly installed Leyland management failed to turn its fortunes around.

With the replacement for the Morris Marina and Leyland Princess being delayed into the 1980s, the Marina was restyled in 1980 to become the Morris Ital, while the Princess was restyled for 1982 to become the Austin Ambassador. British Leyland later confirmed that the Morris brand would be discontinued on the all-new replacement for these two cars, which was finally launched in April 1984 as the Austin Montego.

The Morris Ital (essentially a facelifted Marina) was the last Morris-badged passenger car, with production ending in the summer of 1984. The last Morris of all was a van variant of the Austin Metro, before the Morris brand was finally completely abandoned in 1987.

After much restructuring of BL in the late 1970s and early 1980s, the former Morris plant at Cowley and its sister site the former Pressed Steel plant were turned over to the production of Austin and Rover-badged vehicles. They continued to be used by BL's Austin Rover Group and its successor the Rover Group, which was eventually bought by BMW, and then by a management consortium, leading to the creation of MG Rover.

None of the former Morris buildings now exist. British Aerospace sold the site in 1992; it was then demolished and replaced with the Oxford Business Park. The adjacent former Pressed Steel site (now known as Plant Oxford) is owned and operated by BMW, who use it to assemble the new MINI.

The history of William Morris's business is commemorated in the Morris Motors Museum at the Oxford Bus Museum.

Post-Morris cars to have been built at Cowley include the Austin/MG Maestro, Austin/MG Montego, Rover 600, Rover 800 and (for a short time) the Rover 75.

=== Cancelled revival ===
Following the bankruptcy of the MG Rover Group in 2005, three competing bids were launched aiming to acquire the company's assets. One of the bids, led by Maserati CEO Martin Leach alongside Chinese state-owned Shanghai Automotive Industries Corporation (SAIC), included plans for a Morris Minor revival. Despite this, the bid was lost to the Nanjing Automobile Corporation and the new Minor was not produced, although Nanjing Automobile Corporation later merged with SAIC, with all assets, including the Morris marque, being transferred to SAIC.

== Badge ==
The Morris badge shows an ox fording the River Isis, the traditional emblem of William Morris's home town of Oxford, used in the coat of arms of Oxford.

== Car models (excludes light vans) ==
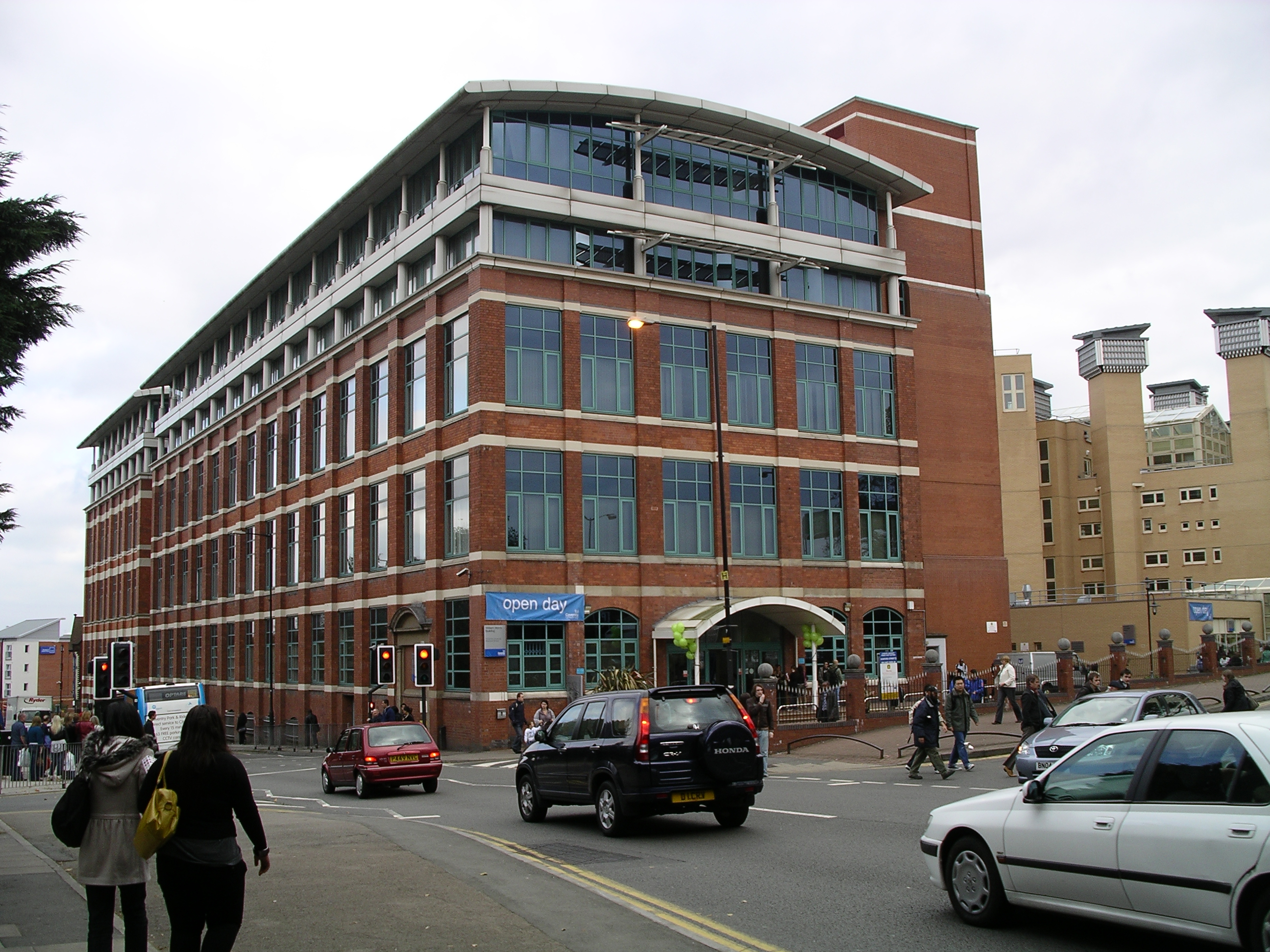
Part of the former Morris Engines works The William Morris Building Coventry University (photo 2007)

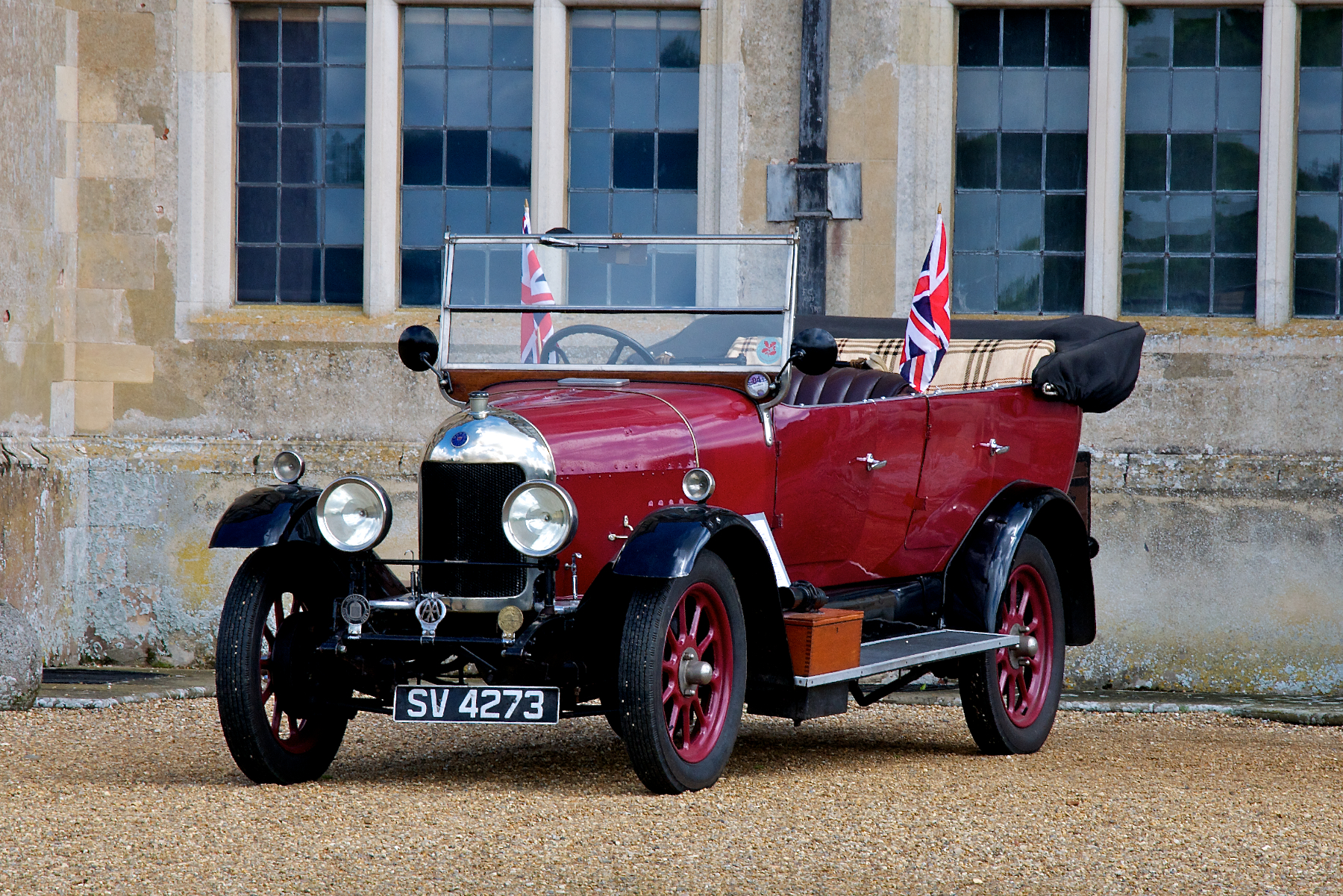
A bullnose Morris, the car that made Morris's name and fortune

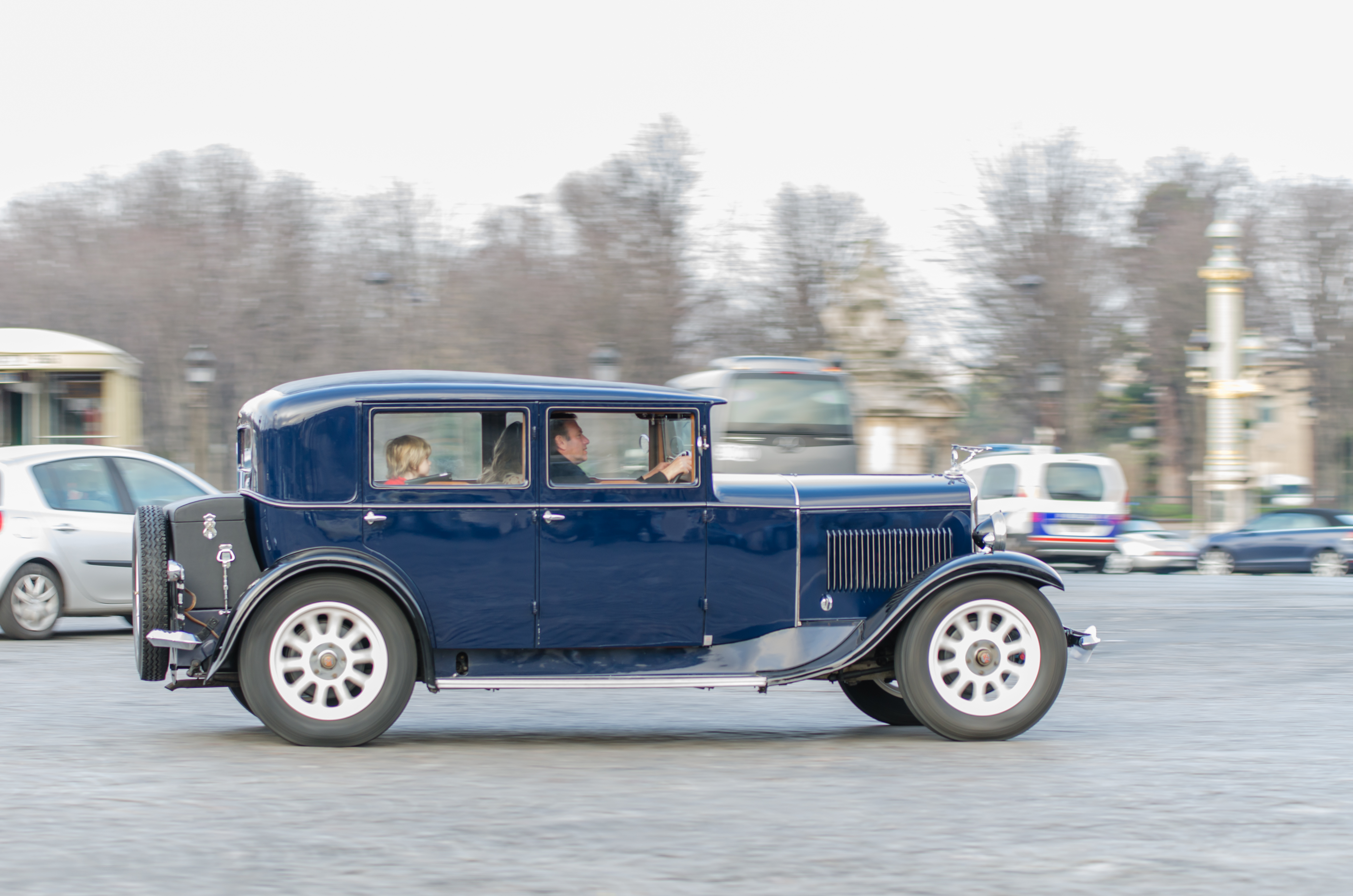
1932 Morris-Léon Bollée France

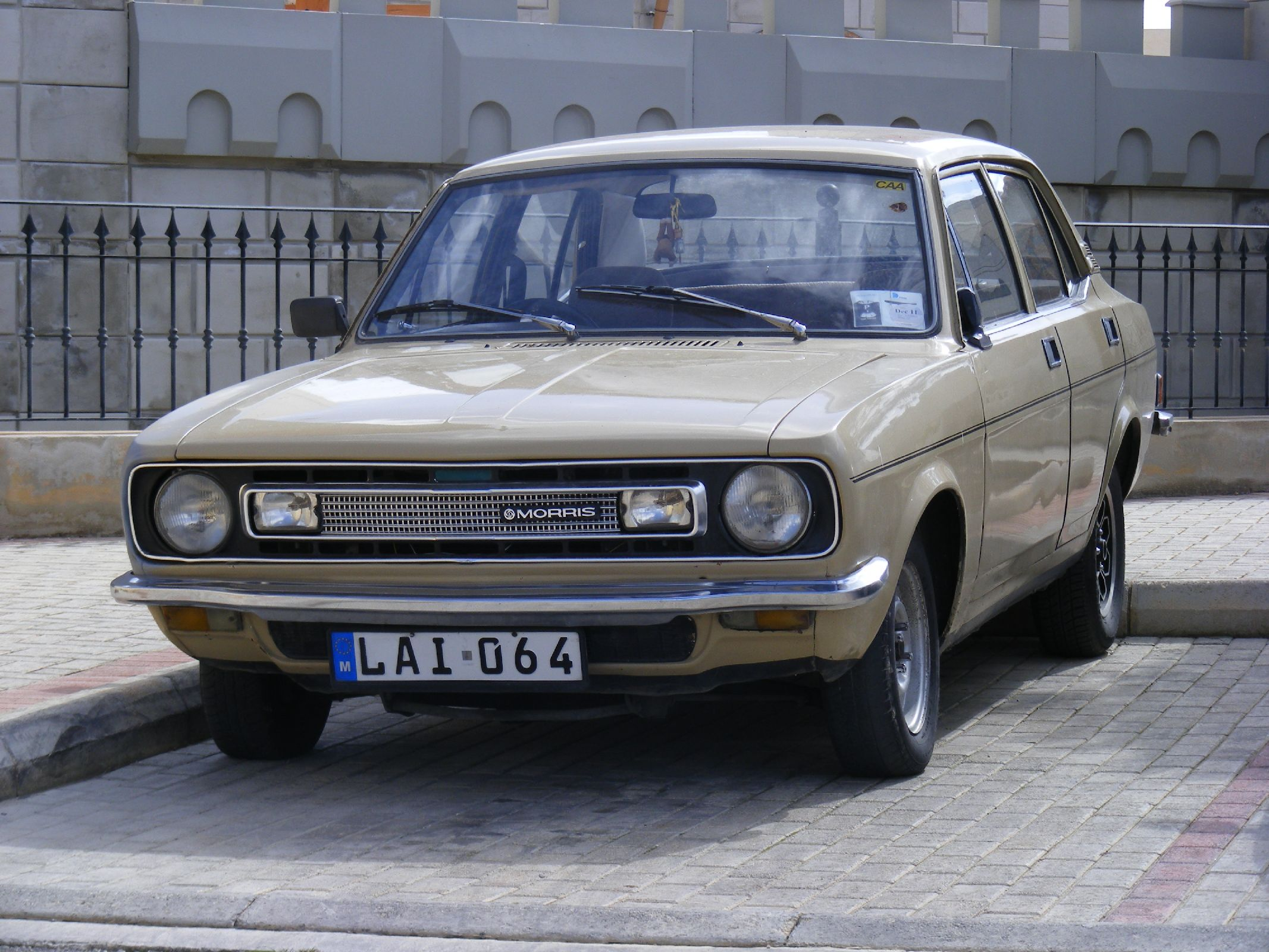
Morris Marina

Many of the model names are based on the tax horsepower rather than the actual horsepower. "Six" often indicates a 6-cylinder engine.

- 1913–1926 - Morris Oxford bullnose (12 or 14 hp)
- 1915–1931 - Morris Cowley bullnose and flatnose (12 or 14 hp)
- 1923–1924 - Morris Oxford Six F series (18 hp)
- 1926–1930 - Morris Oxford flatnose (12 or 14 hp)
- 1926–1929 - Morris Oxford 15.9 and 16/40 (16 hp)
- 1927–1929 - Morris Six (18 hp)
- 1929–1935 - Morris Isis (18 or 25 hp)
- 1928–1932 - Morris Minor (8 hp)
- 1929–1935 - Morris Oxford Six, Sixteen and Twenty (16 or 20 hp)
- 1931–1934 - Morris Cowley (12 or 14 hp)
- 1931–1933 - Morris Major (15 hp then 14 hp)
- 1932–1948 - Morris Ten (10 hp)
- 1933–1935 - Morris Ten Six (12 hp)
- 1933–1935 - Morris Cowley Six (14 hp)
- 1933–1939 - Morris "Big Six" Sixteen, Eighteen, Twenty-One, and Twenty-Five
- 1934–1939 - Morris Twelve (12 hp)
- 1935–1939 - Morris Fourteen (14 hp)
- 1935–1948 - Morris Eight (8 hp)
- 1948–1952 - Morris Minor MM (8 hp)
- 1952–1956 - Morris Minor Series II
- 1956–1971 - Morris Minor 1000
- 1948–1954 - Morris Oxford MO (14 hp)
- 1948–1953 - Morris Six MS
- 1954–1956 - Morris Oxford Series II
- 1954–1959 - Morris Cowley
- 1955–1958 - Morris Isis
- 1956–1959 - Morris Oxford Series III
- 1957–1960 - Morris Marshal (BMC Australia)
- 1958–1964 - Morris Major (BMC Australia)
- 1959–1971 - Morris Oxford Farina
- 1959–1969 - Morris Mini Minor
- 1964–1968 - Morris Mini Moke (United Kingdom)
- 1966–1973 - Morris Mini Moke (Australia)
- 1962–1971 - Morris 1100
- 1967–1971 - Morris 1300
- 1968–???? - Morris 11/55 (South African market variant of Morris 1100)
- 1969–1972 - Morris 1500 (Australia)
- 1966–1975 - Morris 1800
- 1972–1975 - Morris 2200
- 1969–1972 - Morris Nomad (Australia)
- 1971–1980 - Morris Marina
- 1980–1984 - Morris Ital

== Morris-badged tractors ==
Morris-badged tractors
Model	Year(s) of production	Horsepower	Engine type	Notes
Morris-Leyland 154		28 hp (21 kW)		built by BMC Sanayi in Turkey
Morris-Leyland 184				built by BMC Sanayi in Turkey
Nuffield Morris 10/60		60 hp (45 kW)		built by BMC Sanayi in Turkey

== See also ==
- MG Cars
- List of car manufacturers of the United Kingdom
