= Nuffield Tools and Gauges =

Nuffield Tools and Gauges Limited in England was a designer and manufacturer of specialised mass production plant for Morris Motors Limited and its subsidiaries. It also supplied outside customers.

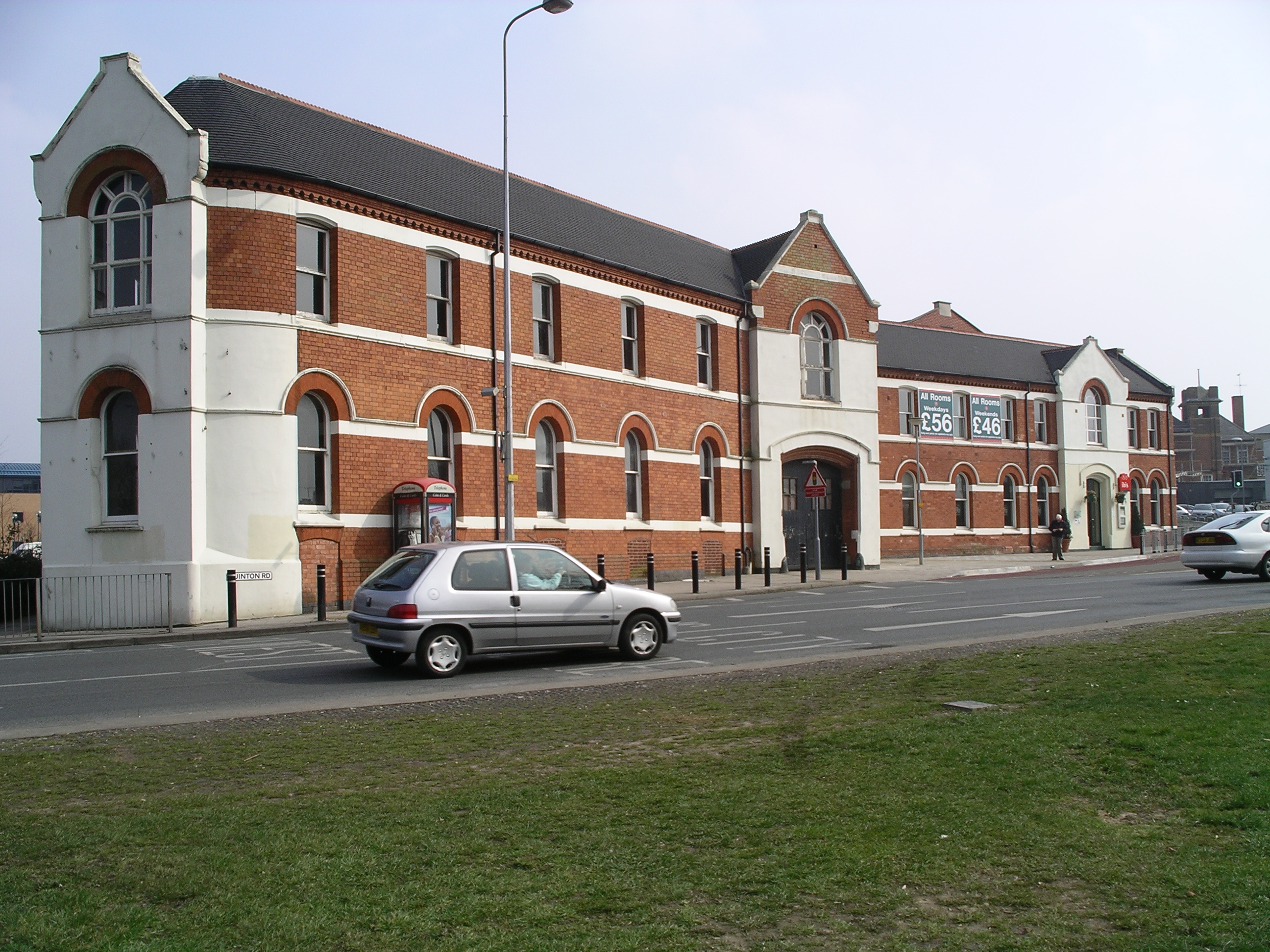
Remaining building, former cycle works, Cheylesmore, Coventry

== Morris Motors Tools and Gauges branch ==
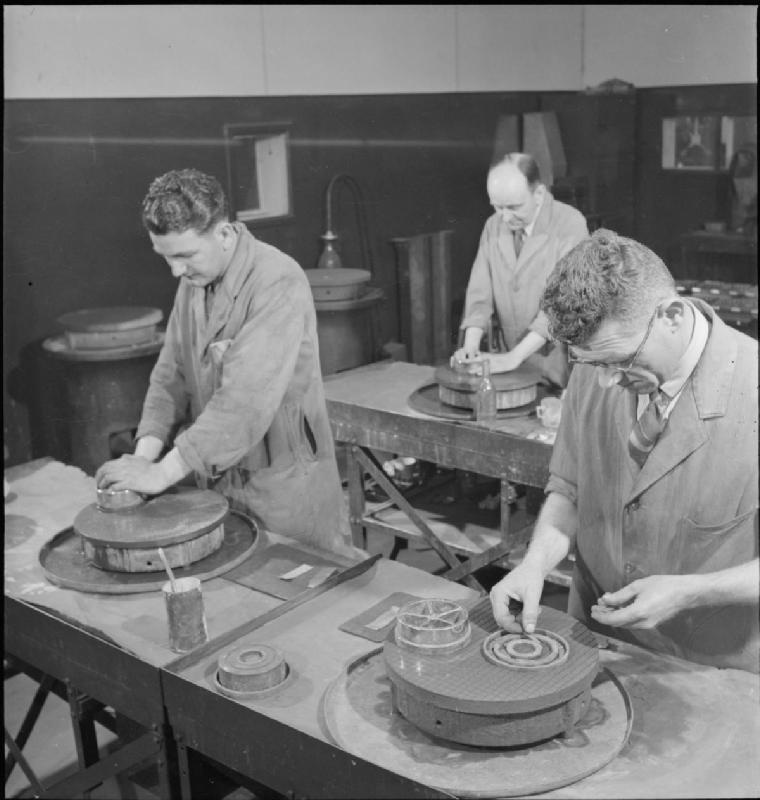
Manufacturing slip gauges, 1945

Formerly a branch activity within Morris Motors a separate company was incorporated and named Nuffield Tools and Gauges Limited to take over that branch business as of 31 December 1942. This followed acquisition of the Cheylesmore Coventry building. Once the home of the Swift Cycle Company and then in use as a factory making shells it had been badly damaged by repeated enemy action in 1940-1941.

== Operations ==
=== Design and manufacture of plant ===
Designer and manufacturer of special-purpose machine tools and follow-through press tools including fixtures and jigs as well as small tools and gauges

=== Manufacture of prototypes ===
They also made prototype parts for any mechanism required.

== Dissolution ==
Nuffield Tools and Gauges Limited was dissolved in 1974.

== See also ==
- Industrial engineering
