= Morris Minor (1928) =

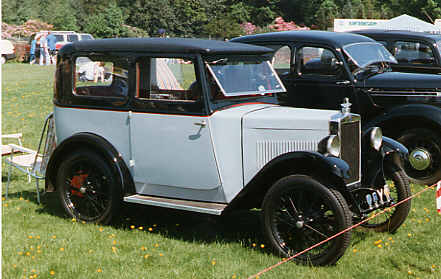
- 4-seat 2-door fabric saloon 1928

Overview
- Manufacturer: Morris Motors Limited
- Production: 1928–1934; 86,318 built
- Assembly: United Kingdom: Cowley, Oxford (Cowley plant)

Body and chassis
- Class: Small car
- Body style: 4-seat 2-door fabric saloon; 4-seat 2-door tourer; 4-seat 2-door coachbuilt saloon; 4-seat 4-door coachbuilt saloon; 2-seat semi-sports; 2-seat 2-door S.V.; Special Coupé; 5-cwt van
- Layout: front engine rear wheel drive
- Related: Wolseley Hornet, MG Midget

Powertrain
- Engine: Wolseley 847 cc single OHC; Morris 847 cc side-valve Straight-4; Engine clutch and gearbox mounted as a unit at four points on rubber washers.
- Transmission: three speed gearbox central gear change lever Clutch: single plate dry propeller shaft: inside torque tube Hardy disc joints final drive: spiral bevel; four speed gearbox Sept. 1932(not on base model)

Dimensions
- Wheelbase: standard; 78 in (2,000 mm) track 42 in (1,100 mm): 4-door saloon; 91 in (2,300 mm)
- Length: 120 in (3,000 mm); 13 in (330 mm)
- Width: 49.5 in (1,260 mm)
- Height: depending on coachwork
- Kerb weight: 700 kg (1,543 lb) 13¾ cwt (2-door saloon)

Chronology
- Successor: Morris Eight

Wolseley SOHC Morris SV
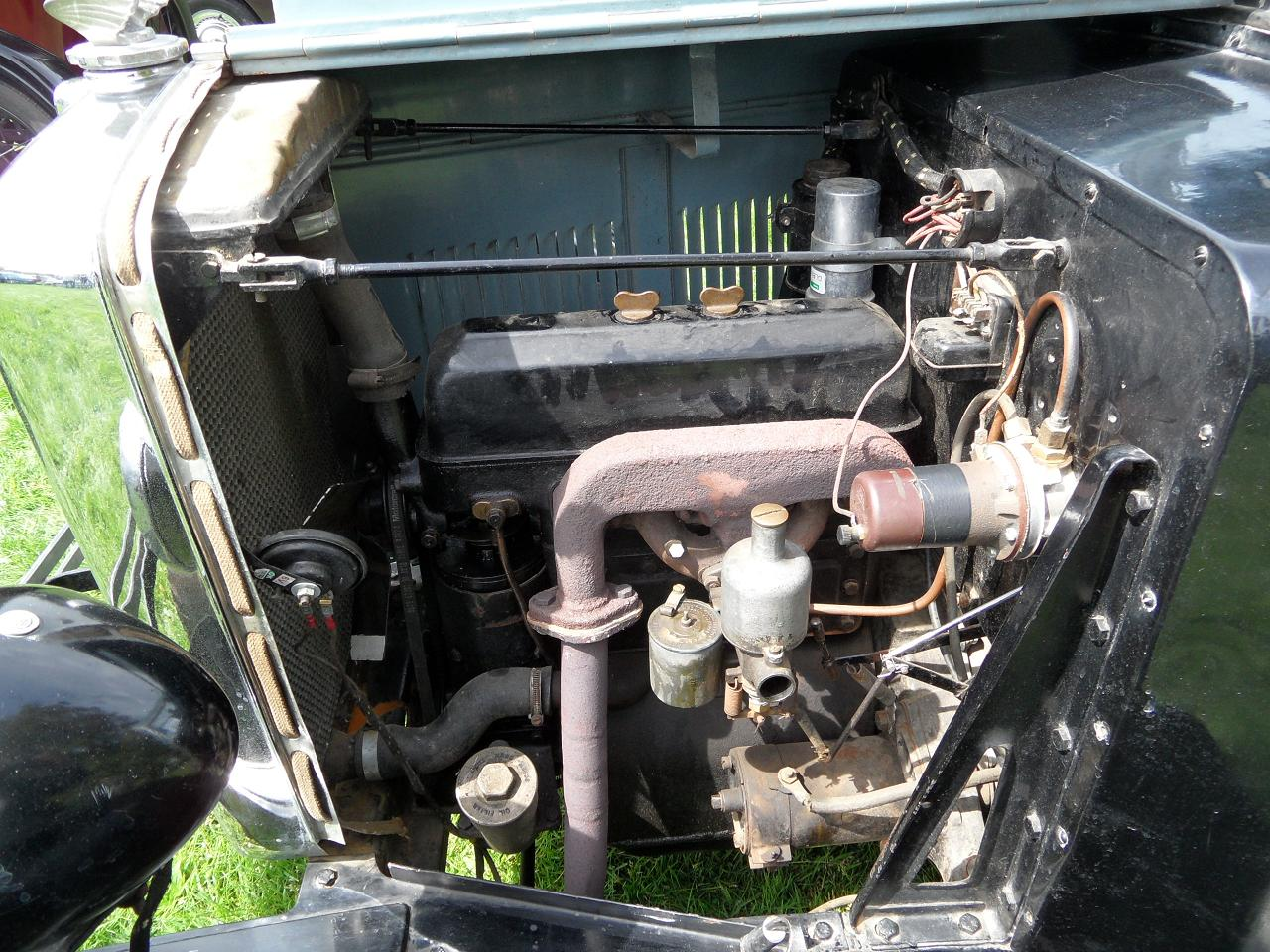
- SOHC engine under the bonnet of Family Eight Special Coupé 1932

Overview
- Manufacturer: Wolseley Motors (1927) Limited, Ward End works, Birmingham; Morris Engines Gosford Street, Coventry
- Production: SOHC 39,087; SV — 47,231

Layout
- Configuration: 4 in-line
- Displacement: 847 cc (52 cu in)
- Cylinder bore: 57 mm (2.2 in)
- Piston stroke: 83 mm (3.3 in)
- Cylinder block material: iron, cast en bloc detachable head pistons: aluminium connecting rods: steel crankshaft: main bearings: two, roller in front, plain behind
- Cylinder head material: detachable without disturbing camshaft or valve gear.
- Valvetrain: overhead valves single overhead camshaft camshaft driven by vertical drive at the front of the engine valves operated by fingers mounted in eccentric bushes.; side valves

Combustion
- Fuel system: S.U. carburettor
- Fuel type: petrol, tank in the scuttle
- Oil system: force-feed lubrication to all parts
- Cooling system: water circulated by thermo-siphon 2-bladed fan

Output
- Power output: 20 bhp (15 kW; 20 PS) @4,000 rpm; 19.25 bhp (14.35 kW; 19.52 PS) @4,000 rpm Tax horsepower 8.06

Chronology
- Predecessor: none
- Successor: 918 cc Morris Eight

The Morris Minor is a small 4-seater car with an 850 cc engine (2 variations) manufactured by Morris Motors Limited from 1928 until 1934. The name was resurrected for another newer car for the same market in 1948.

== History - motivation ==
Beginning in 1922 the tiny seven horsepower Austin had brought motoring to a new public and broadened the market. Against that Morris's Oxfords and Cowleys had taken 41 per cent of the entire 1925 British private car market. Morris sales had begun to slow in 1926. They were revived by a new face for the Morris Oxford and Cowley and an expansion of Morris's range both up and down the scale.

The same year William Morris realised millions from the sale and stock market listing of preference shares in his business and he privately bought Wolseley, founded by Herbert Austin, which until a few years earlier had been Britain's largest car manufacturer.

William Morris now had ample wherewithal to go after Herbert Austin's little car with his own small Morris. With a surplus of production facilities, and Wolseley's design engineers added to his own at Morris Commercial Cars, little time was taken for development of the Morris Minor. A more complex design than Austin's Seven, the all-new car was on the market before the middle of 1928.

== Mechanicals ==
=== Engine ===
The new Morris engine was designed by Wolseley, by this time also personally owned by William Morris. It was largely a new design but following a conventional Wolseley SOHC front camshaft drive concept if much smaller than any existing Wolseley unit. The overhead camshaft was driven by a vertical spiral bevel geared shaft that passed through the dynamo carrying the armature. A single SU carburettor was fitted and coil ignition used. The engine produced 20 bhp (15 kW) at 4000 rpm allowing a top speed of 55 mph (88 km/h). The electrical system was 6 volt.

The Morris Minor's engine was produced in two versions. From 1928 to 1930 all the cars had an 847 cc overhead-camshaft engine designed and made by Wolseley. It remained in production for the more expensive Minors until 1932.

Morris's in-house engineers at Morris Commercial Cars led by Percy Rose, (Note: Rose had been apprenticed to Royce in Cook Street Manchester, he joined Morris in 1922) who had designed the chassis, devised a simpler valve train for the same block. This more conventional side-valve unit of slightly lower power output entered production in late 1930 at Morris Commercial Cars' new premises in the former Wolseley works at Adderley Park, under the supervision of the young Leonard Lord. Initially for the lower-priced cars — first for the £100 car, later for others — it remained in production until 1934.

39,087 of the overhead-camshaft type and 47,231 of the side-valve version were made.

=== Chassis ===
Although the company's main assembly plant was at Cowley, outside Oxford, the chassis and running gear were designed at another of W R Morris's private investments, Birmingham-based Morris Commercial Cars. Previously E G Wrigley & Co it was a former component supplier to Morris. He had bought and renamed it after it had fallen into receivership. Wrigley's had invested heavily and re-equipped its works to make components for a major mass-produced motorcar project, which had collapsed at the last minute.

The chassis built of channel-section steel has cable-operated four-wheel brakes and it rides on half-elliptic springs. The 26-inch wire wheels take tyres of 3.50-inch section. (by December the car tested had 27 x 4.00-inch tyres) The car is to be complete with all accessories including an engine starter. The central brake lever works a transmission brake at the back of the gearbox. The bucket-type front seats are adjustable, the passenger's side folds and tips.

Equipment includes:

- automatic screen wiper – suction operated
- driving mirror
- shock-absorbers at both back and front
- full width bumpers at each end etc.
- safety glass by Triplex is available at extra cost
- petrol gauge
- electric horn
- speedometer

At first the only body types offered were a 2-door fabric-bodied saloon and a four-seat tourer, but during production up to a dozen different body styles were used. A big part of their success was that they were full-sized cars in miniature. The accommodation in the 2-door cars was described as "chummy" because of the unavoidable personal contact in the confined space.

From a cartoon of the day:
First urchin: (surveying a small car parked at the kerb) "Its an Austin, I tell yer."
Second urchin: "T'aint, its a Morris Minor."
Third urchin: "S'neither, it's got pedals."

== Morris Eight, Austin Seven ==
Said W R Morris, "Some people think that my idea is to try to crush the Austin Seven off the market, which is absurd. But I can say this, my price will not be higher than that of the Austin Seven." Sir Herbert rejoined, "Personally, and as firms, we are on the best of terms with the Morris Company. The public will decide whose car they like best. Mr Morris's decision (to enter this sector) is no surprise to me ... I knew what was going on weeks ago."

There were no pictures, but the public's first detailed description of the new 8 hp Morris was released on Saturday 26 May 1928. The press release did say the engine's dimensions were 56 x 76 = 748 cc – presumably for Sir Herbert Austin The press had been told (they claimed by someone at Morris) these names were being considered: Morris-Oxley, -Bully, -Carfax, -Magdalen, -Calfley, -ette, -Iffley, -Dancer, -Moxley and -Cox.
The Motoring weeklies published better descriptions and photographs in the last week of August.

Next, on Saturday 1 September 1928, prices were advertised:

- Tourer with leather, £125, (actual cars had Rexine) with Triplex Safety Glass screen £127.
- Two-door fabric saloon in blue or brown with sliding windows £135, with Triplex all round £141.10.0.
- Chassis only £100.

The launch was on 11 October 1928 at the opening of London's 22nd Olympia Motor Show. A 4-seated tourer was displayed and a 4-seated saloon with sliding windows. Both had two doors. The Times motoring correspondent tested the fabric saloon and reported at length in December finishing with "I liked the general control and one does not get the impression that one is driving a very small car".

The fabric covered bodies used so much wadding to smooth their corners birds learned to peck through the fabric for the felt to build their nests.

Coachbuilt, steel-panelled cars with a folding "sunshine" roof, i.e. "an opening head", for £9 more than the fabric car, were announced in August 1929 and all three cars were given rear-hinged doors with their forward ends sloping towards the front at the bottom. "This gives the required foot room for entering or leaving a light car". The two saloons shown at Olympia had buffers. A 5-cwt van was added to the Minor range for 1930. It was displayed as Morris's smallest van offering at the 1929 Motor Transport Show.

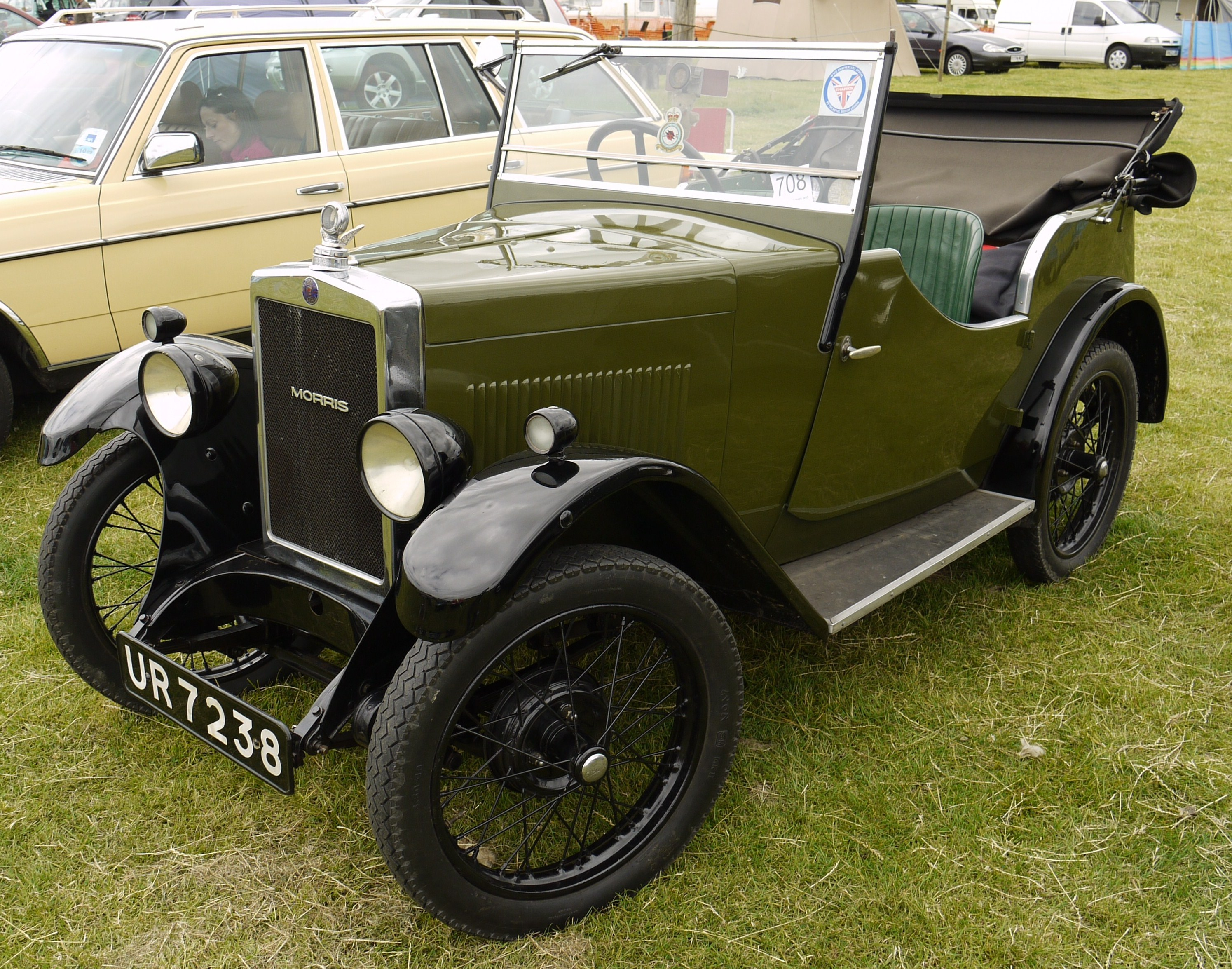
tourer registered July 1930

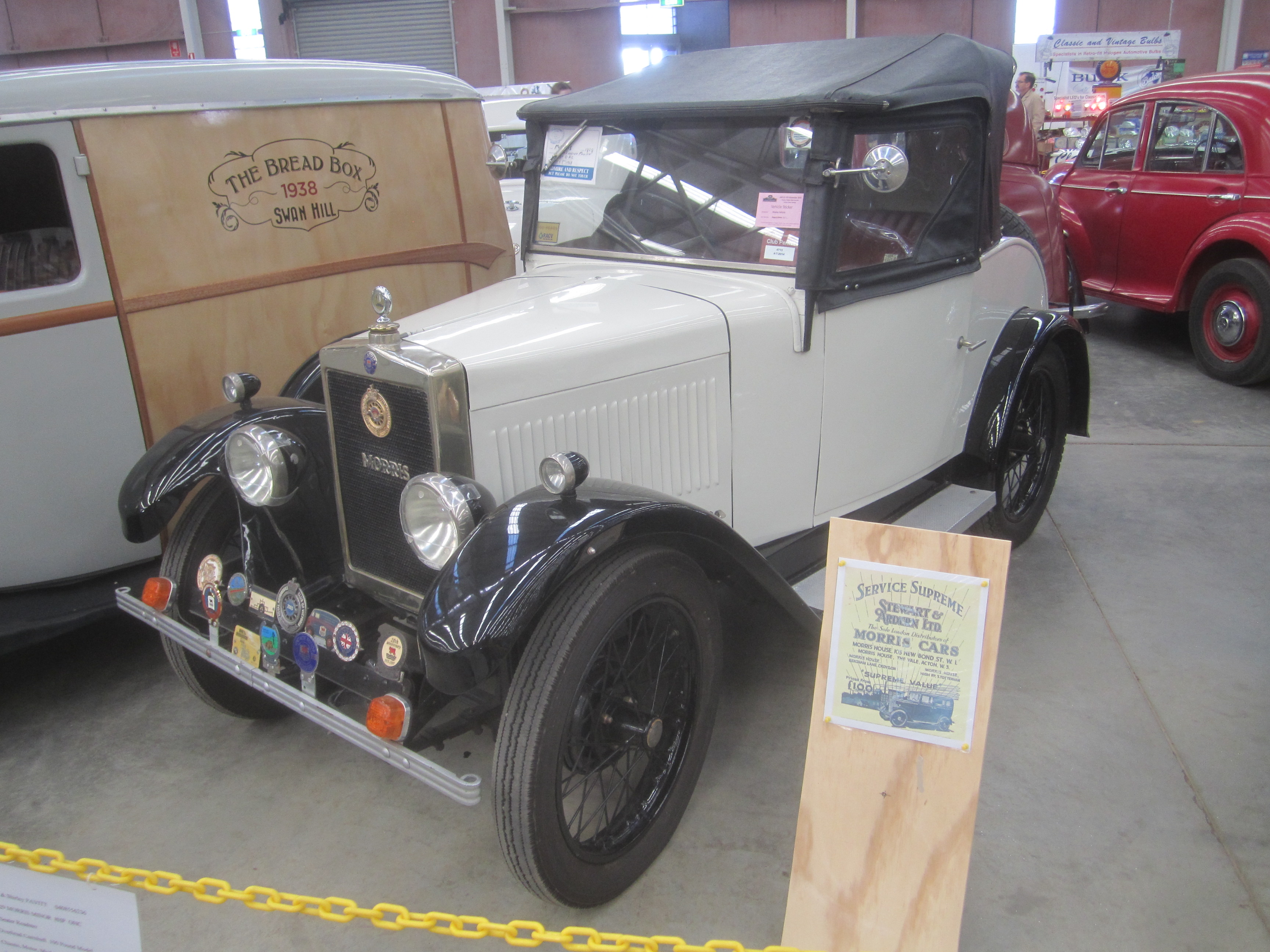
2-seater displaying buffer

The following year, in August 1930, a new 2-seater semi-sports joined the range with a hood and side screens. It was designed for two adults and their luggage and was cheapest in the range by £5. The tourer and two saloons, fabric and steel-panelled, remained in production. Advertisements referred to improved coachwork comfort and finish and improved lubrication and electrical systems. Tyres were now 19 x 4.00-inches. The coachbuilt saloon might now be had in black as well as blue. This last saloon came with automatic windscreen wiper, rear-vision mirror, safety glass and the new chromium finish. Morris's stand at Olympia displayed just a chassis of the Minor.

== A £100 motor-car ==
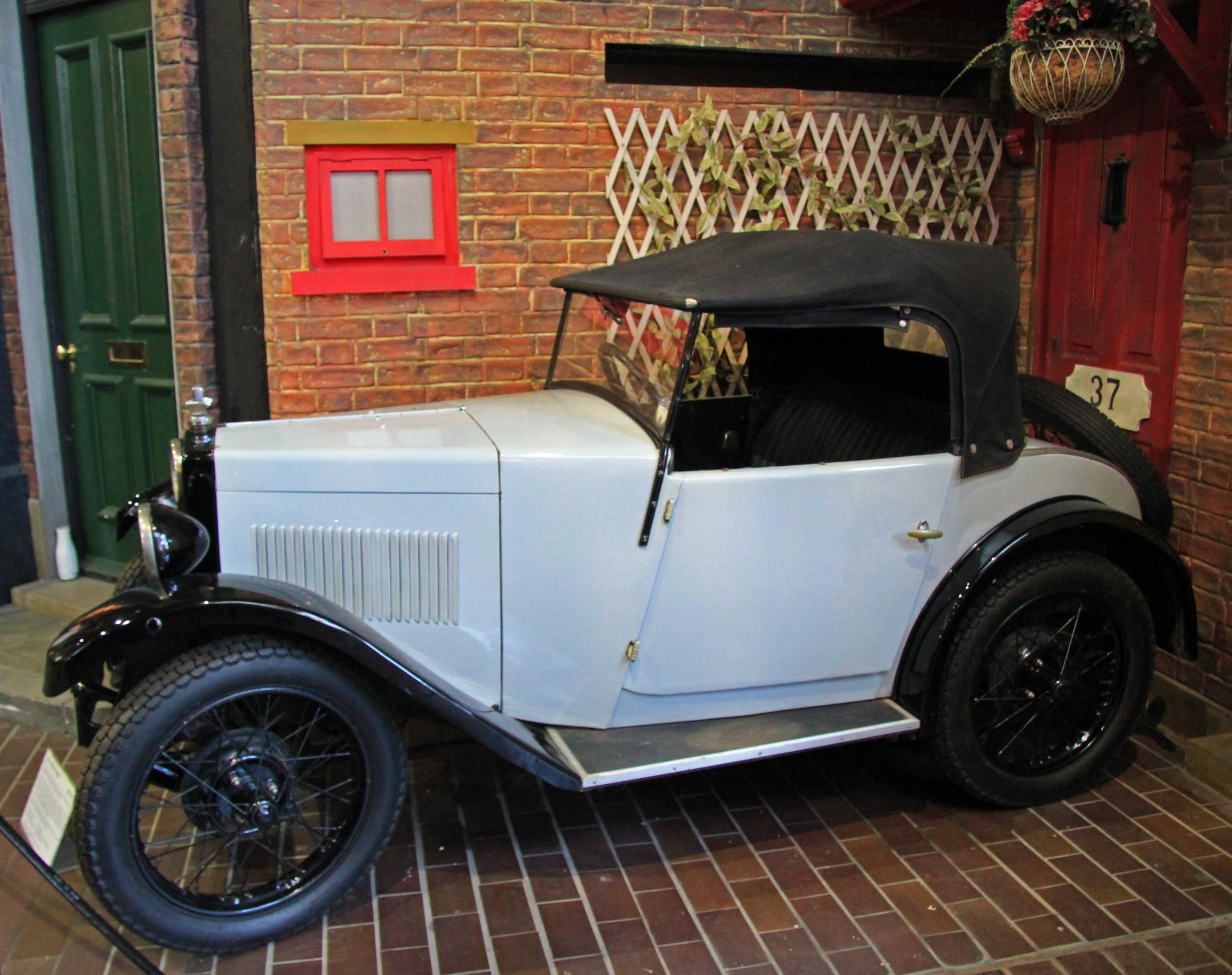
seventh £100 car — chassis SV107 Beaulieu National Motor Museum

Just before Christmas 1930 Sir William Morris Bt. released a statement saying that he would put on the market very soon a new car to sell at £100 and it would be known as the Morris Minor S.V. two-seater. The body, he said, is to be coach built—steel panels on a wood frame—has as few bright parts as possible "to reduce polishing" and is finished in naval grey with red upholstery. Decarbonisation and valve adjustment were very simple and contributed to the new car's low running costs. Within a few months 2-door saloon models with the S.V. type engine were also in production. A 4-seater S.V. tourer was announced in April.

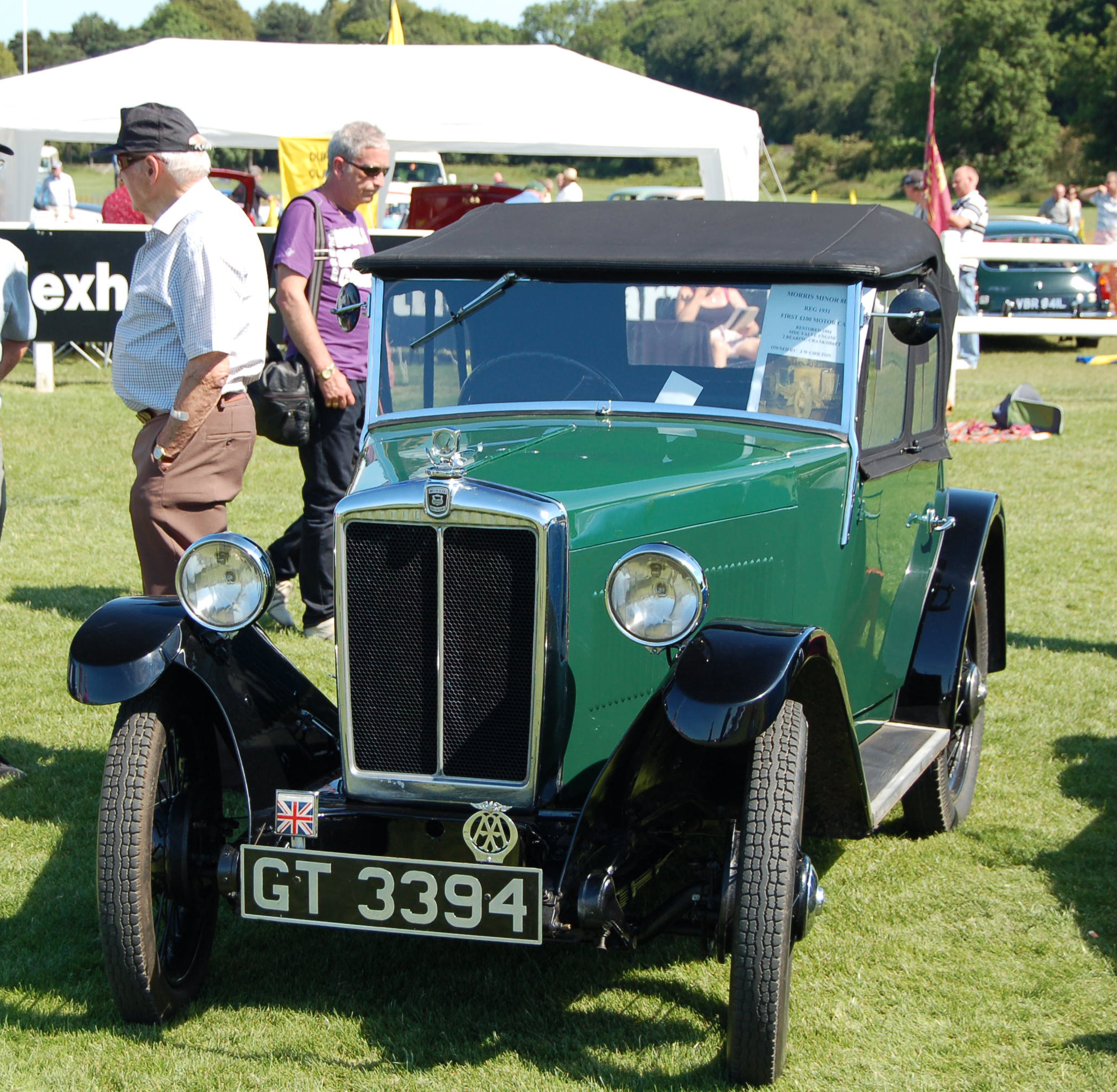
The £100 car 1932 model 2-seater, radiator shell now chromed again, registered December 1931, Magna wire wheels

The overhead valve engine was proving to be expensive to make and Wolseley's design—the six-cylinder version powered their successful Hornet saloon, and racing MGs (Note: MG F-type and MG L-type Magnas, and MG K-type and MG N-type Magnettes)—suffered from oil getting into the dynamo. So in 1931 a version with valve gear re-designed by staff of Morris Engines using side-valves and giving nearly the same power output, 19 bhp (14 kW) at 4000 rpm, was introduced.

On the road, the tester advised, the new Morris Minor S.V. exceeded 50 mph. A certain amount of wheel-bounce consumed a lot of power when testing standing-start times. The tappets could have been adjusted more finely, the accelerator needs a steadier spring and there should be a rest pedal beside it. Speed and brake levers were rather distant, top speed was apt to jump out when the load came off, some wheel bounce and movement with such a short wheelbase is acceptable, the foot brakes pulled to the near-side.

The lower cost of the new engine allowed the Minor to be sold for the magic £100 as a stripped-down two-seater. The S.V. 2-seater cars were priced exactly 25 per cent cheaper than the SOHC cars had been. For a while both overhead and side valve versions were produced. The overhead-camshaft unit survived until 1932 in the four-door model, which also gained hydraulic brakes.

== A four-door saloon ==
In August 1931 a new radiator shape was revealed. The overhead valve version was renamed Morris Family Eight and was given a 7 ft 7 inches wheelbase, an extra 13 inches. The Family Eight was placed within the range between the Minor and Cowley. This saloon has four doors and has enough room for four grown persons. 17 x 4.50-inch tyres were fitted to the new Magna type wire wheels. Magna wheels were now fitted throughout the entire Morris range. The saloon bodies were slightly restyled with a more rounded look being given an "eddyfree" front, the standard size was roomier, their front seats could be adjusted and their doors were widened and fitted with safety glass winding instead of sliding windows. New colour schemes were made available. The fuel tank moved from the scuttle area below the windscreen to the rear of the car. An electric fuel pump or "automatic petrol-lift" was fitted.

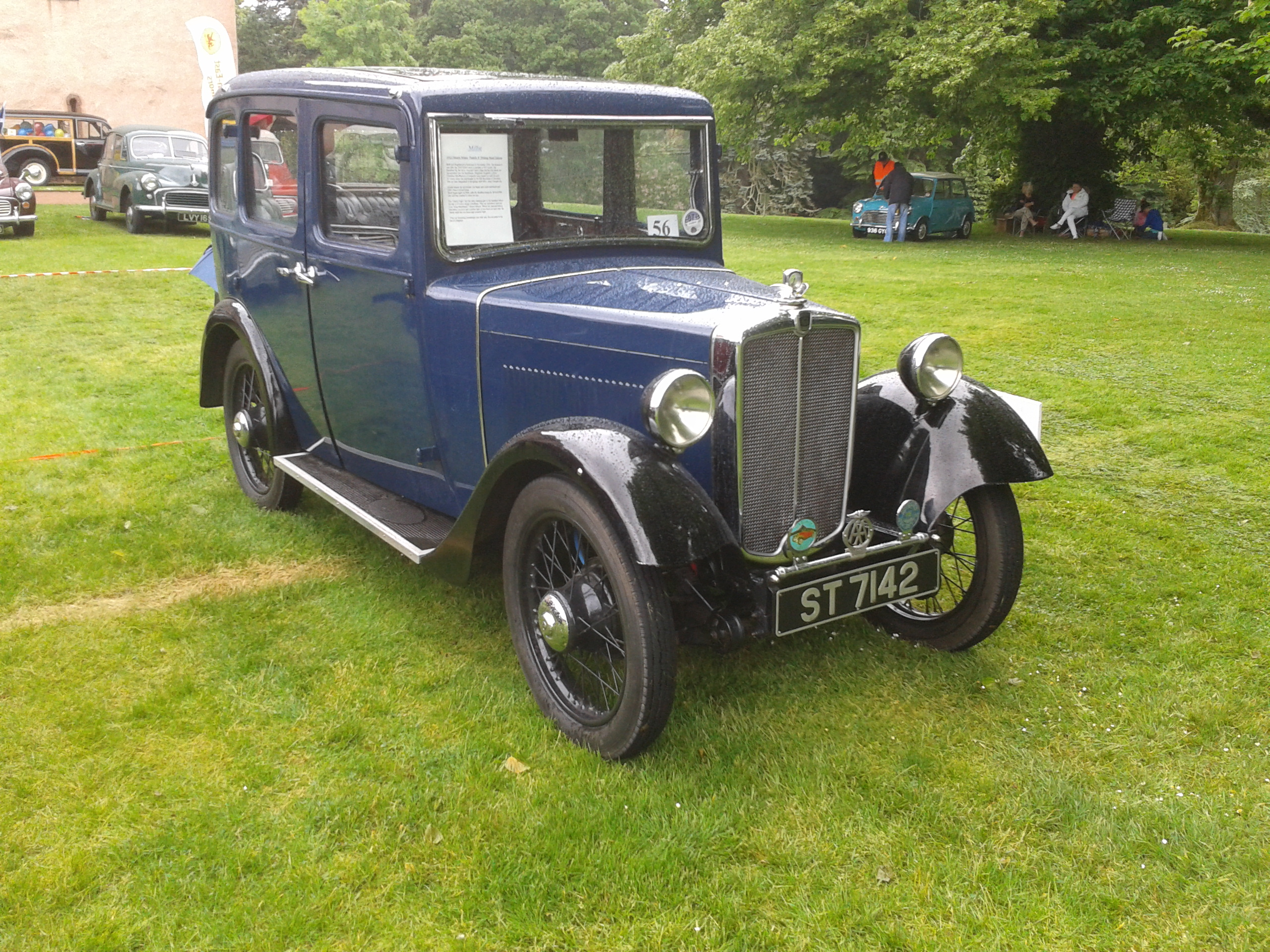
Family Eight saloon long wheelbase not registered until November 1932 Magna wire wheels

Morris Family Eight SOHC prices:

- 4-door 4-seat Saloon with sliding head £152.10.0
- Sports coupé with sliding head £175 later named Special Coupé
- chassis £115

These Morris Family Eight cars were fitted with hydraulic brakes. Their new smooth sloping screen and rounded front allowed smooth passage of air and less resistance. The use of hydraulics distinguished the Morris from the competing Austin 7 with its less reliable cable brakes.

The S.V. cars continued now known as Morris Minors in contrast to the Morris Family Eight cars.

Morris Minor S.V. prices:

- 2-seater £100
- tourer £115
- saloon £112.10.0 (with sliding head £125)
- Chassis only £90

All Morris cars were given anti-splash side-shields to their front wings. The Minor was given a new better-looking radiator and longer bonnet, better steering by Bishop Cam, and a four-speed gearbox. The £100 2-seater kept the old radiator, three-speed gearbox, worm and wheel steering and windscreen of a single panel.

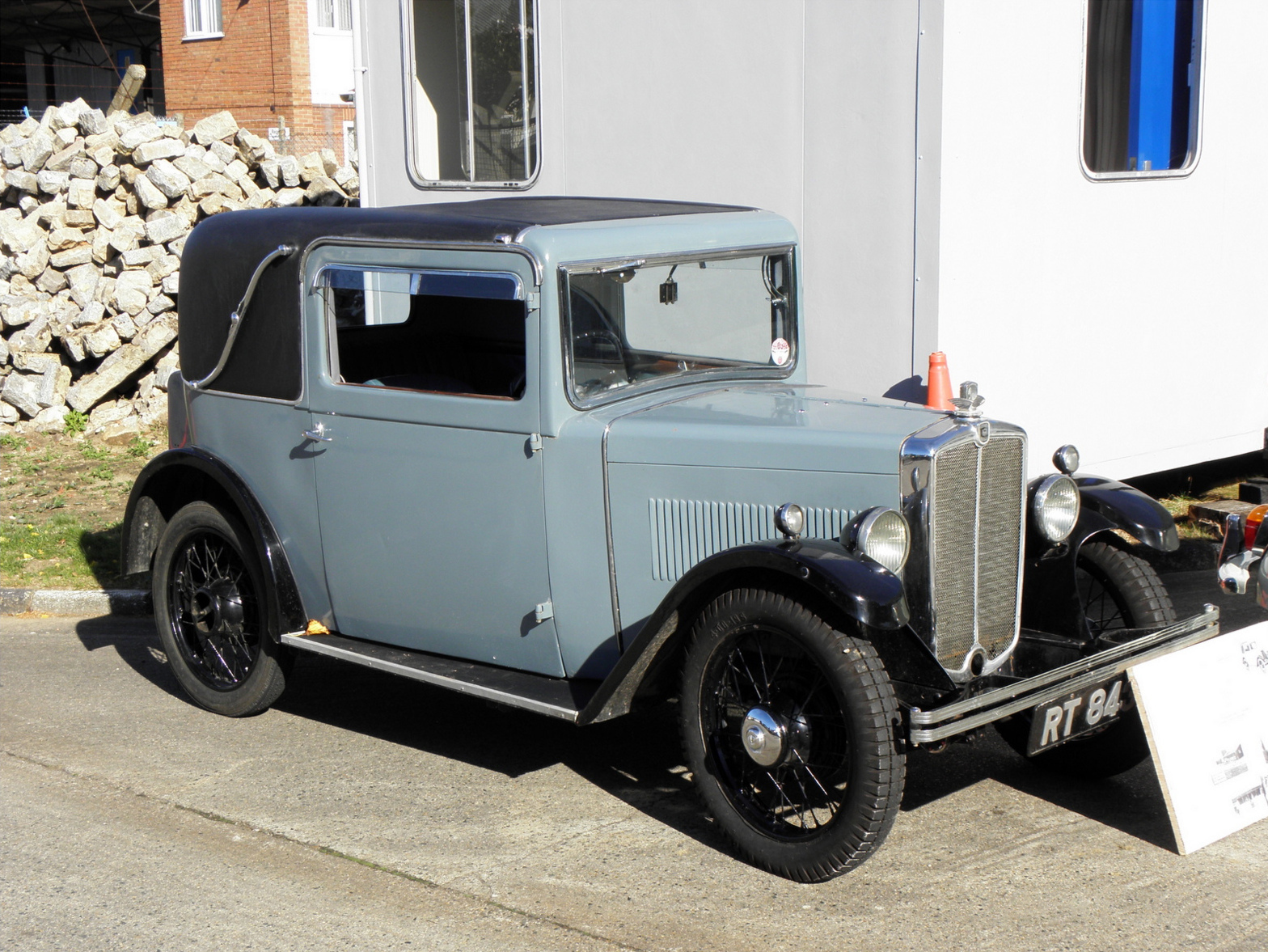
Special Coupé registered January 1932

Morris displayed at the next Motor Show in October 1932 a Minor chassis for £87.10.0. For £90 the same chassis came equipped with a four-speed twin-top gearbox ("silent" third), cam steering and deep radiator. The 2-door Minor coachbuilt saloon is £125 or with fixed head £122.10.0

Also displayed was the new side valve Family Saloon, a long wheelbase car previously named Family Eight when equipped with the SOHC engine. There is now a Special Coupé for £165. The complete Family Saloon is £145 and the chassis alone £100.

By the end of August 1933 all Morris cars had synchromesh four-speed gearboxes, dipping headlights, hydraulic shock absorbers, leather upholstery, hydraulic brakes, rear petrol tank, direction indicators and safety glass. The Family Saloon and Minor added to that illuminated direction indicators and pneumatic upholstery.

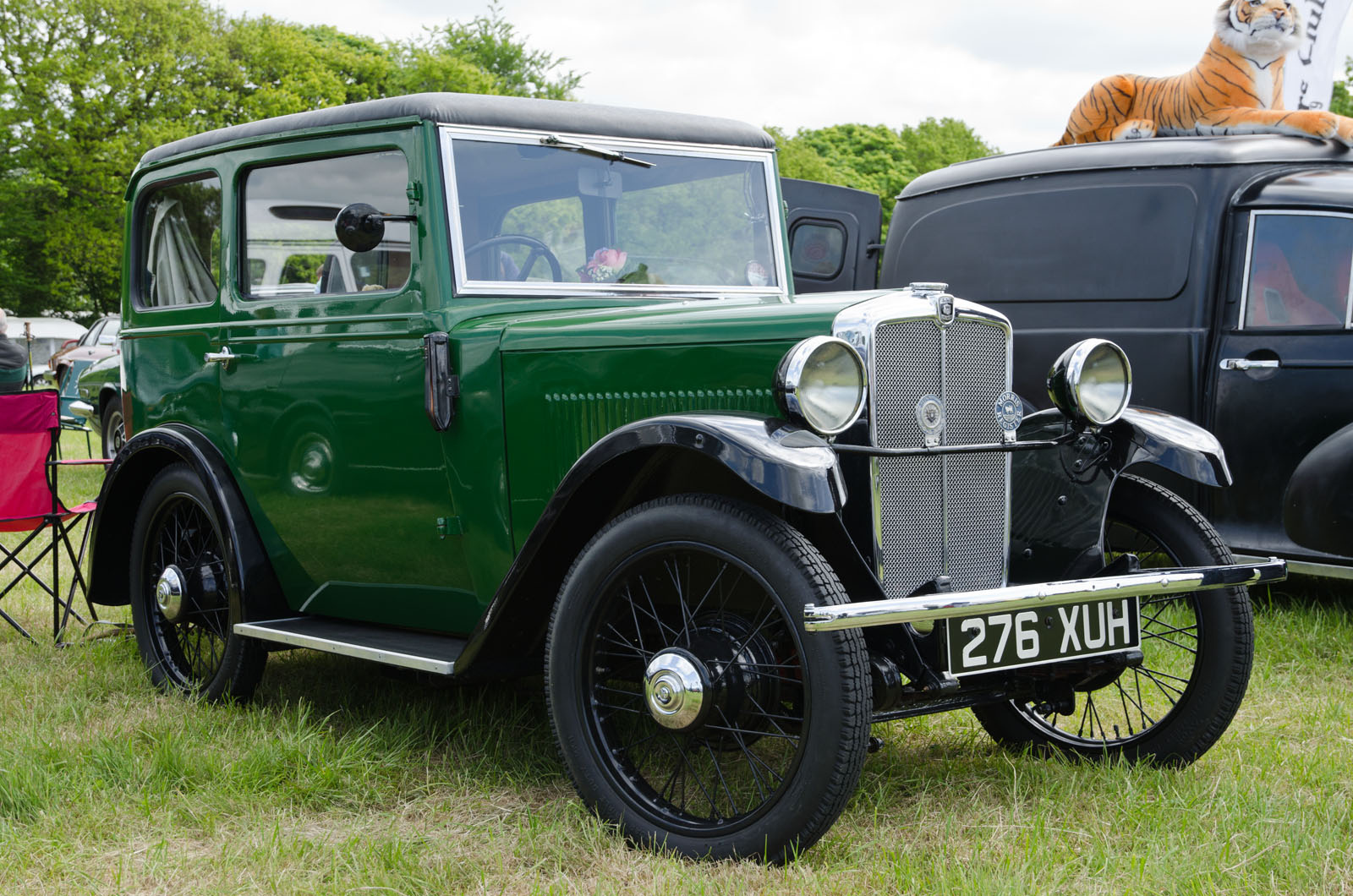
2-door saloon on the original wheelbase 1933

The £100 car suffered a price rise in August 1933.

The 2-door saloon on the original wheelbase was tested and the result published in November 1933. The tester was pleased enough but made much of the fact that this car was designed to carry three adults or two adults and two children. He described the car as narrow in the beam but with room enough and added that the seats are "reasonably comfortable".

The Minor and Family Saloon were replaced by the Morris Eight in August 1934 with an entirely new body and a slightly larger 918 cc engine. It continued to be a sales success.

== Quantity produced ==
| Morris Minor | 1929 | 1930 | 1931 | 1932 | 1933 | 1934 | Total |
|---|---|---|---|---|---|---|---|
| OHC cars and vans | 12638 | 14264 | 7697 | 4488 | | | 39087 |
| CV cars and vans | | | 5435 | 14765 | 13478 | 13555 | 47231 |
| Total | 12638 | 14264 | 13132 | 19253 | 13478 | 13555 | 86320 |

OHC cars exceeded the number of SV cars

== Percentage of production by body style ==
| Body style | saloon short wheelbase | van | saloon long wheelbase | two seater | tourer | chassis only | special coupé |
|---|---|---|---|---|---|---|---|
| per cent | 57 | 11 | 10 | 10 | 6 | 5 | 1 |

The Morris Minor name was revived in 1948 for the Issigonis-designed car.
