= Morris Oxford bullnose =

Morris Oxford
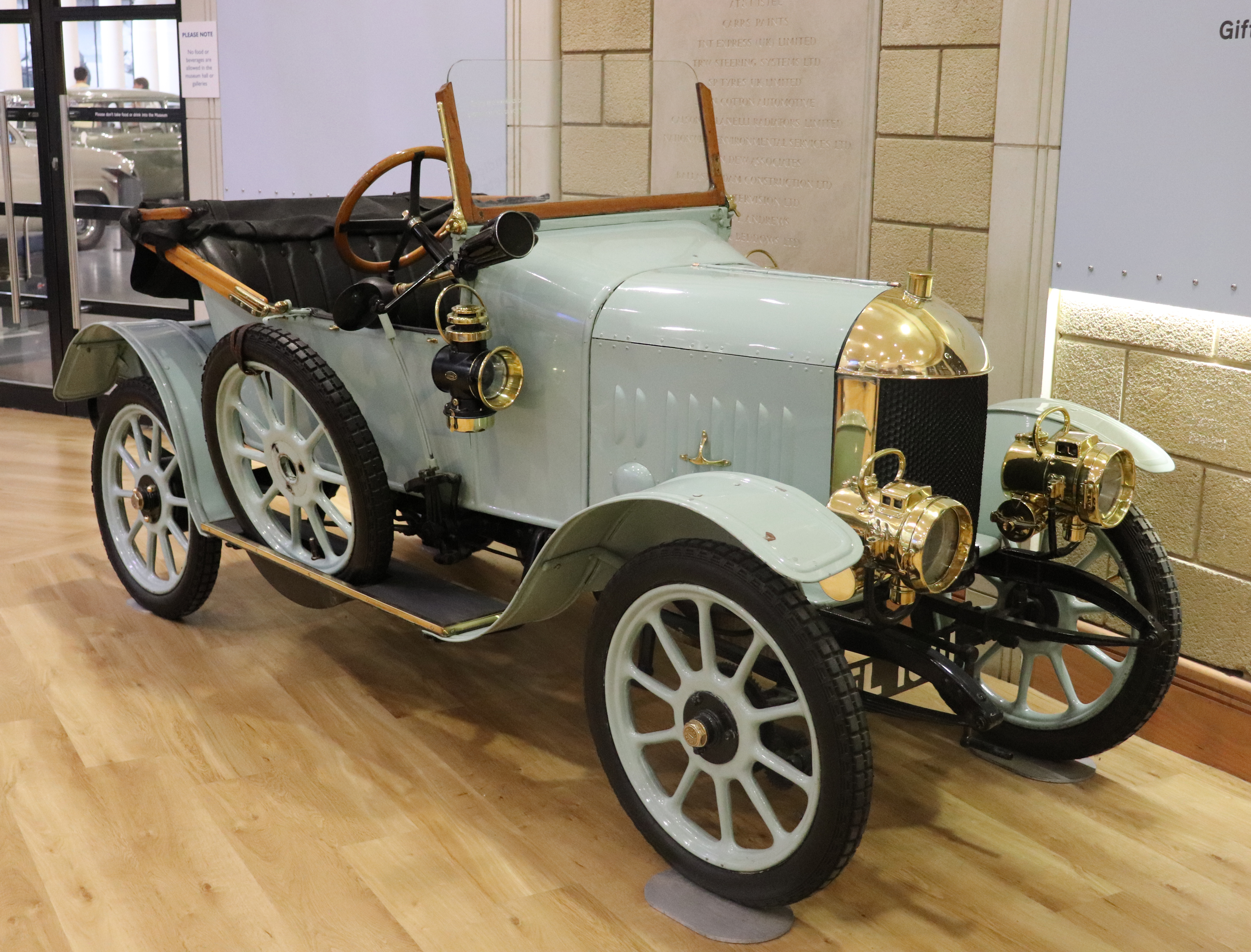
- Oxford 2-seater 1913

Overview
- Manufacturer: Morris Motors
- Production: 1913–1926
- Assembly: United Kingdom: Oxford, Oxfordshire, England

Body and chassis
- Class: Small car

The "bullnose" Morris Oxford is a series of motor car models produced by British manufacturer Morris from 1913 to 1926. It was named by W R Morris after the city in which he grew up and which his cars were to industrialise.

== Oxford bullnose (1913–1916) ==
Oxford bullnose two-seater
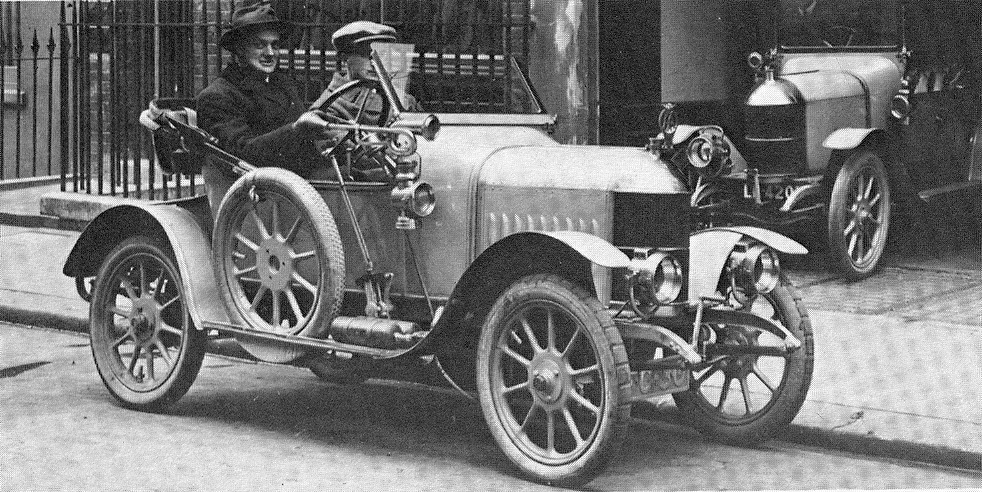
- Oxford 2-seater 1913; W R Morris and passenger

Overview
- Manufacturer: W R M Motors Limited
- Production: 1913–1916
- Designer: W R Morris

Body and chassis
- Body style: open 2-seater torpedo; open 2-seater torpedo de luxe; coupé cabriolet; limousine; Commercial variant; no windscreen or door was fitted to: sporting car; delivery van
- Layout: FR layout
- Related: Cowley

Powertrain
- Engine: W&P 1,018 cc (62.1 cu in) I4
- Transmission: 3-speeds and reverse manual W&P; gearbox control lever outside body; multiplate clutch in oil also by W&P; universal joint behind gearbox; propeller shaft in a torque tube; back axle — overhead Wrigley worm

Dimensions
- Wheelbase: 84 in (2,134 mm) standard; track 40 in (1,016 mm) standard; ( increased to 42 in (1,067 mm) ); 90 in (2,286 mm) de luxe; track 45 in (1,143 mm) de luxe
- Length: standard: 126 in (3,200 mm); de luxe: 132 in (3,353 mm)
- Width: standard: 47 in (1,194 mm); de luxe: 50 in (1,270 mm)
- Kerb weight: standard: 558 kg (1,230 lb); de luxe: 635 kg (1,400 lb)

Chronology
- Successor: Hotchkiss engined car

Engine White & Poppe 60 X 90 X 4

Overview
- Manufacturer: White & Poppe Limited, Lockhurst Lane, Coventry
- Designer: Paul August Poppe
- Production: 1913: 393; 1914: 909; 1915: 173; total: 1,475

Layout
- Configuration: 4 in-line
- Displacement: 1,017.8 cc (62 cu in)
- Cylinder bore: 60 mm (2.4 in)
- Piston stroke: 90 mm (3.5 in)
- Cylinder block material: iron, cast en bloc, fixed head pistons: cast iron crankshaft: carbon steel main bearings: three white metal in bronze shells
- Cylinder head material: fixed, iron, cast en bloc with block, detachable valve caps
- Valvetrain: side valve T-head camshafts each side crankcase adjustable tappets

Combustion
- Fuel system: carburettor W&P No. 25 magneto: Bosch type ZF4 later cars Mea plugs: Bosch
- Fuel type: petrol
- Oil system: main bearings: by galleries from oil flung off the flywheel big-ends: splash
- Cooling system: water circulated by thermo-siphon no fan

Output
- Power output: 16.4 bhp (12.2 kW; 16.6 PS) @2,400 rpm (observed, not a maximum); Tax horsepower 9
- Torque output: 35.7 pound force-feet (48 N⋅m) @2,400 rpm

Chronology
- Successor: Hotchkiss

William Morris's first car was called Oxford in recognition of its home city. It was announced in The Autocar magazine in October 1912 and production began in March 1913. Because he had a limited amount of capital and was unwilling to share ownership of his business little was made in-house. Virtually all components were bought-in and assembled by Morris. It was a small car with a 1018 cc four-cylinder side-valve engine with fixed cylinder head from White & Poppe. Ignition was by a Bosch magneto.

The chassis made by Rubery Owen was of pressed-steel construction and suspension was by leaf springs, semi-elliptic at the front and longer three-quarter elliptic at the rear slung above the axle. The welded single piece banjo rear axle with splined half shafts was driven by a Wrigley Worm. The front axle was of forged steel and, like the back axle assembly and the steering, was made by Wrigley. The brakes, on the rear wheels only, were the external contracting type, metal to metal, using four shoes in each drum. A White & Poppe three-forward and reverse gearbox was fitted. The Powell & Hanmer headlamps were acetylene and the side and tail lamps oil. The windscreen, by Auster Limited of Barford Street, Birmingham, like the lamps was classed as an accessory.

The car got its popular name, Bullnose, from its distinctive round-topped radiator at first called the bullet nose. Most bodies, made by Raworth of Oxford, were of the two-seat open-tourer type. There was also a van version, but the chassis did not allow four-seat bodies to be fitted, as it was not strong enough and too short.

=== Bullnose de luxe ===
It was first displayed at the Olympia Motor Show which opened 7 November 1913. The standard model remained in production unchanged. The new de luxe had a longer wheelbase, 90 in (2,300 mm), and track was now 45 in (1,100 mm).

The range of bodies was now expanded from the simple two-seater to include even a limousine and a sporting car which, like the vans, had no windscreen or doors but was provided with a speedometer as a standard fitting.

Its front axle and steering had been re-designed to reduce "bump-steer"and its radiator capacity increased. Grooved tyres were now supplied at the rear. The banjo back axle was no longer welded but built up from three pieces and its springs were now slung below it.

The new de luxe Morris-Oxford Light Car announced at the 1913 Motor Show

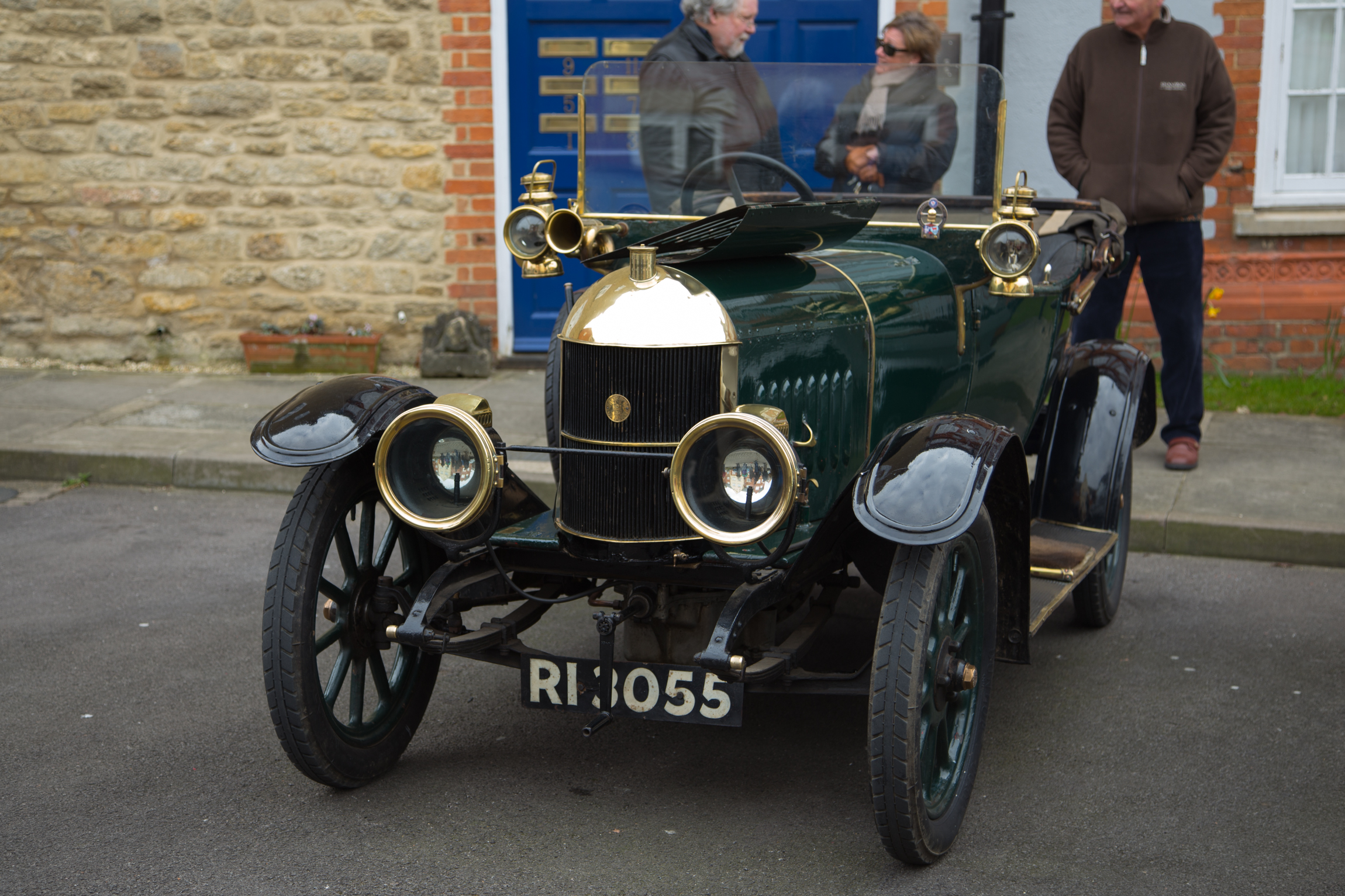

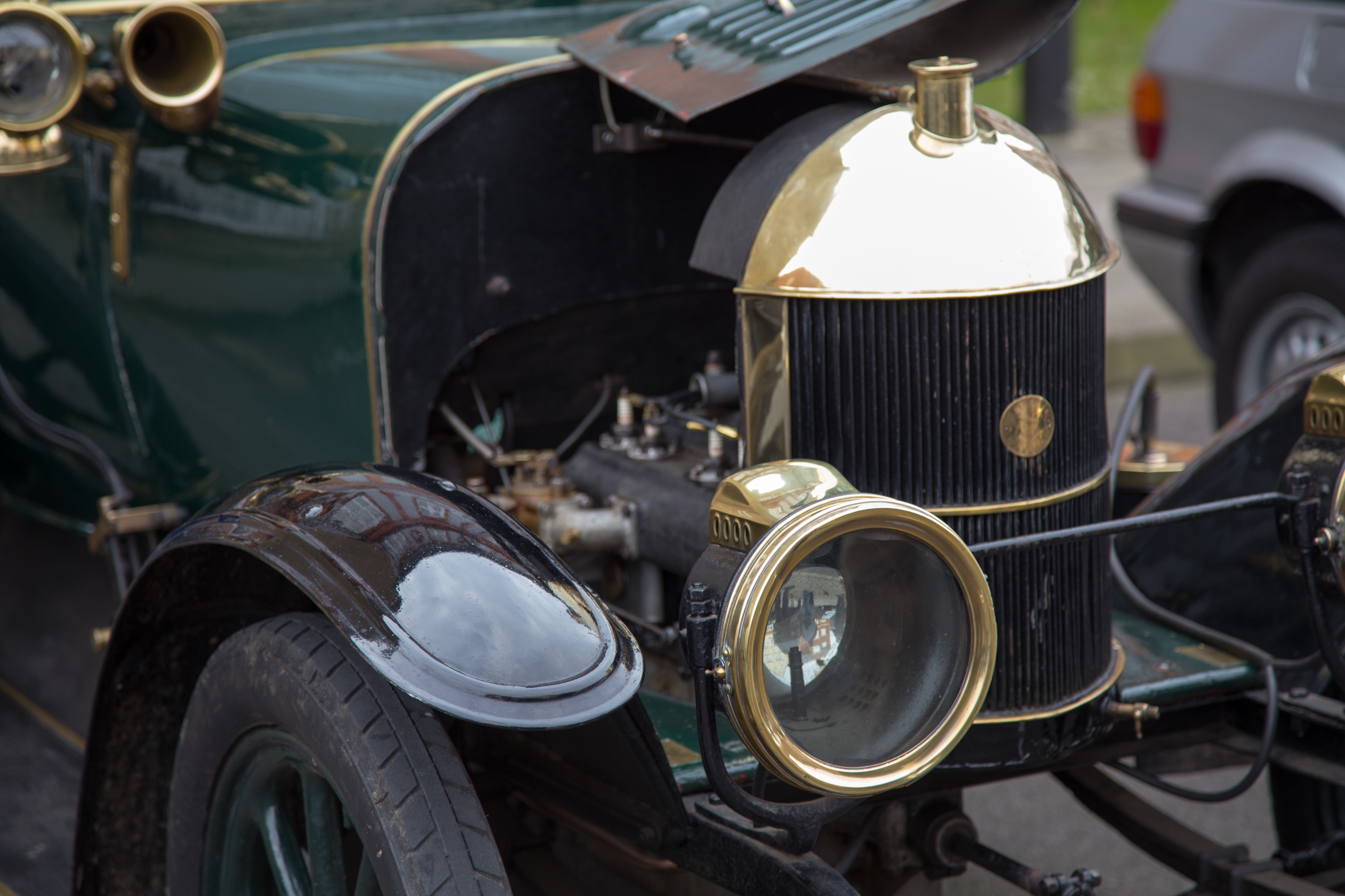

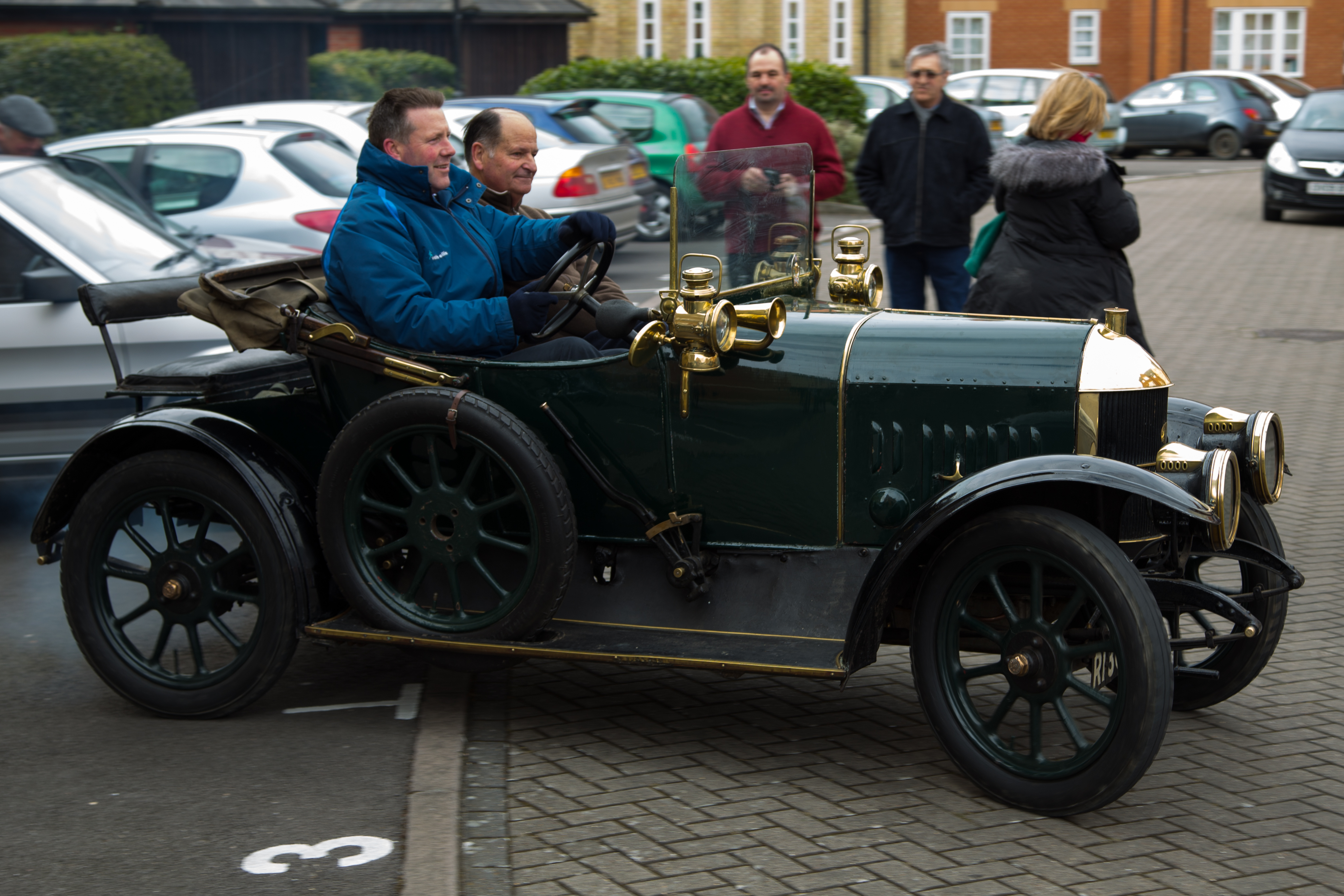

=== Trial of the Morris-Oxford Light Car ===
In April 1914 readers of The Times were asked to remember the suggested solution to concern amongst British manufacturers brought about by the influx of cheaper American vehicles. The suggestion was to have British firms co-operate producing a certain part or parts of the complete mechanism later assembled and sold by a joint undertaking. The Morris-Oxford Light Car, it was explained to readers, was produced on a similar principle. The engine clutch and gearbox were from the works of White & Poppe, the rear axle and the rest of the transmission from Wrigley's.

Of his trial The Times's correspondent reported happy results. Everything was characterised by extreme "up-to-dateness" and the vehicle lacked scarcely any amenity of the largest and most expensive car.

"In general the Morris-Oxford car showed itself to be a speedy and sweet running little car with good hill-climbing powers and an unusual quality of engine flexibility. It is free from any trickiness in handling and is characterised by a general robustness of construction which is very commendable."

Because of this car's significance to Britain's new motor industry the points made by The Times's correspondent are summarised below:

- engine: "runs reasonably sweetly at all speeds" despite its small size requiring extremely high r.p.m. to provide full power
- flexibility: as little as 4 mph could be handled in top direct gear. When the throttle is opened the engine gives better acceleration than might be expected
- speed: the greatest speed on level ground was little short of 50 mph.
- roadholding: it holds the road very comfortably when travelling fast
- frame distortion due to rough roads: is not communicated to the single unit of the engine, multiple-disc clutch mechanism and gearbox
- gearbox: gear changes were easy and quiet at all speeds but the gears themselves were noisy on all but top gear
- clutch: free of chatter or jar it worked easily and sweetly
- worm-driven rear axle: makes the transmission when in top gear "as noiseless as in the largest and most luxurious vehicles"
- brakes: both hand and foot brakes applied directly to the rear wheels. The car pulled up swiftly, completely free of harshness
- accelerator pedal: controls the engine speed. An ingenious device allows the setting of slow running by screwing the head of the pedal on its stem
- comfort: well sprung it leaves little to be desired by driver or passenger when compared to others of its class despite the short wheelbase
- steering: is easy
- body: seats two people comfortably, the makers have "realised the importance of an eyeable and practical neatness"
- windscreen: single folding. Windscreen brackets support the side lamps and anchor the hood straps
- equipment: Two acetylene head lights, three oil lamps (side and tail), horn, pump, jack, tools and a spare detachable wheel.
- wheels: Sankey steel

=== Cowley ===
The American engined Continental Cowley, with most other significant components US sourced, shown to the press in April 1915, was a 50 percent larger engined (1495 cc against 1018 cc), longer, wider and better equipped version of this Morris Oxford with the same "Bullnose" radiator.

The Cowley's stronger and larger construction could carry a four-passenger body.

== Oxford bullnose (1919–1926) ==
Oxford bullnose 1919–26
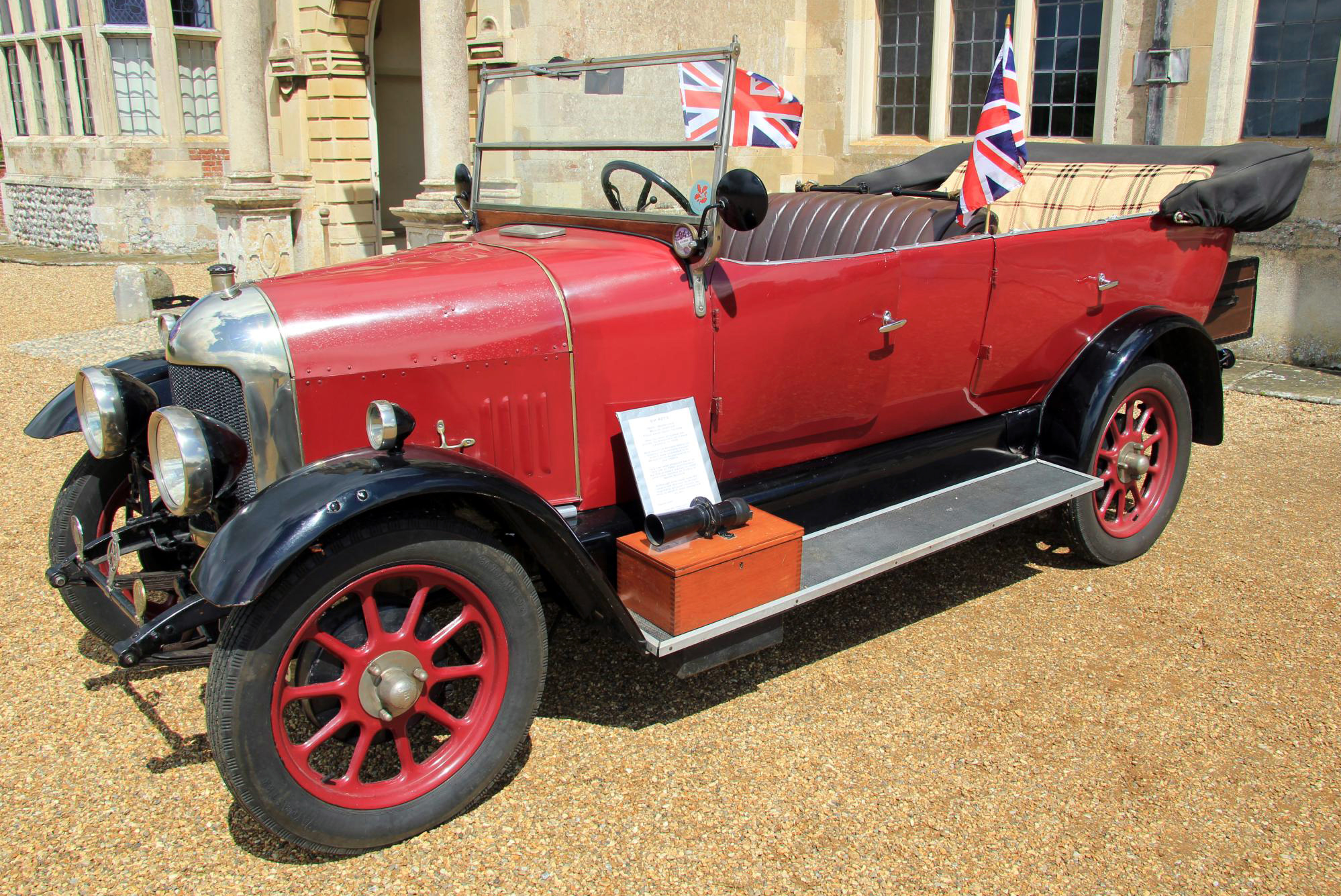
- 1925 Four-seater tourer on the new for 1925 long wheelbase chassis

Overview
- Manufacturer: W R Morris Limited
- Production: 1919–1926

Body and chassis
- Body style: open 2-seater; open 4-seater tourer; coupé; cabriolet from 1923; saloon from 1924; landaulet from 1926; ¾ coupé from 1926; saloon landaulet from 1926
- Layout: FR layout

Powertrain
- Engine: side valve straight-4; 1,548 cc (94.5 cu in) 11.9 hp; - standard until September 1924; 1,802 cc (110.0 cu in) 13.9 hp 14/28 - optional from January 1923 to September 1924 then standard
- Transmission: 3-speeds and reverse manual; gearbox two plate cork-lined clutch; universal joint behind gearbox; propeller shaft in a torque tube; back axle: ¾ floating, spiral bevel

Dimensions
- Wheelbase: 102 in (2,591 mm) 1919-24; 108 in (2,743 mm) 1925-26; 106.5 in (2,705 mm) 1927; track 48 in (1,219 mm)
- Length: 150 in (3,810 mm) 2-seater 153 in (3,886 mm) 4-seater
- Width: 58 in (1,473 mm)
- Kerb weight: open 4-seater tourer; 1,876 lb (851 kg) 1921; 1,960 lb (889 kg) 1922; 2,044 lb (927 kg) 1923; 2,128 lb (965 kg) 1924; 2,352 lb (1,067 kg) 1925; 2,268 lb (1,029 kg) 1926

Chronology
- Successor: Morris Oxford flatnose

The 1919 Oxford (advertised as early as September 1918) was assembled from locally made components and now took on the rather more substantial aspect of 1915's Cowley. Longer and stronger than the old Oxford, enough to carry five passengers, the new Oxford retained the pre-war Bullnose radiator style in its larger version.

From August 1919, the Cowley became the downmarket "no frills" variant with only a 2-seater body and lighter smaller tyres. The Oxford had a self-starter (an extra for the Cowley) and a better electrical system and the Oxford took and kept the Cowley's leather upholstery.

The new car's 11.9 fiscal horsepower 1548 cc engine was made under licence in Coventry for Morris by a British branch of Hotchkiss the French ordnance company which was turning away from guns to the motor industry. The Hotchkiss engine used the Cowley's Detroit USA Continental Motors Company design. Hotchkiss prices well undercut White and Poppe who had made Oxford engines up to that time. Morris bought Hotchkiss's British factory in May 1923 and named it Morris Engines.

When it was shown at the Scottish Motor Show in January 1920 it drew large crowds of enthusiasts all day. The chassis alone was shown and was admired for the way all transmission, everything revolving, was fully enclosed in what amounts to an oil bath, everything but the fan belt. A few weeks later after a lengthy trial of the new car The Times' motoring reporter wrote that the car represents "a very decided advance in light car construction". The common sense of the designers is shown in many small details but "its greatest charm is in the engine's steam-like flexibility" and liveliness. In these respects it was the best engine the writer had ever encountered.

=== MG version ===
The bodies were made by Carbodies Limited of Coventry. At first panelled entirely in aluminium in 1925 and 1926 aluminium was reserved for the lower part of the body and mudguards and scuttle were then steel.

Engines Hotchkiss / Morris 11.9 (CA and CB) Morris 14/28 (CE)

Overview
- Manufacturer: Hotchkiss & Cie. Gosford Street Coventry until May 1923, works thereafter under the ownership of Morris Engines Limited
- Production: (for Morris Oxford); 11.9 hp: 1919 to 1926; 14/28 hp: 1923 to 1930

Layout
- Configuration: straight-4 cast en bloc with upper crankcase
- Displacement: 1.548 L (94.5 cu in); 1.802 L (110.0 cu in) (14/28)
- Cylinder bore: 75 mm (3.0 in) (14/28); 69.5 mm (2.74 in)
- Piston stroke: 102 mm (4.0 in)
- Cylinder block material: cast-iron 3-bearing crankshaft pistons: cast-iron crankshaft: steel stamping, bronze backed white metal bearings, sump cast aluminium
- Cylinder head material: cast-iron detachable copper asbestos sandwich gasket
- Valvetrain: side valve L-head, helical timing gears, camshaft in two plain bearings operating valves by mushroom head tappets, single valve springs

Combustion
- Fuel system: carburettor; 1919-1921 Zenith; 1922 S.U.; 1923-1926 Smith (various); exhaust; 3-port; 4-port from February 1922; magneto: helical bevel drive; 1919 Thomson-Bennett G4*; 1920 B T-H; 1921-23 Lucas E4; 1924-26 Lucas GA4
- Fuel type: petrol
- Oil system: main bearings and camshaft; pressure lubricated by plunger pump from camshaft; big ends: splash
- Cooling system: water thermosyphon, fan assisted radiator 1919 by Randle, thereafter by Osberton

Output
- Power output: not published: tax rating 11.9hp; tax rating 13.9hp (14/28)

Chronology
- Predecessor: White & Poppe 60 X 90 X 4

=== Engine ===
In July 1921 The Times stated that the 11.9 hp Morris Oxford could attain a speed of around 45 miles an hour on the level, being capable of running up Arms Hill, a gradient of about 1 in 4.

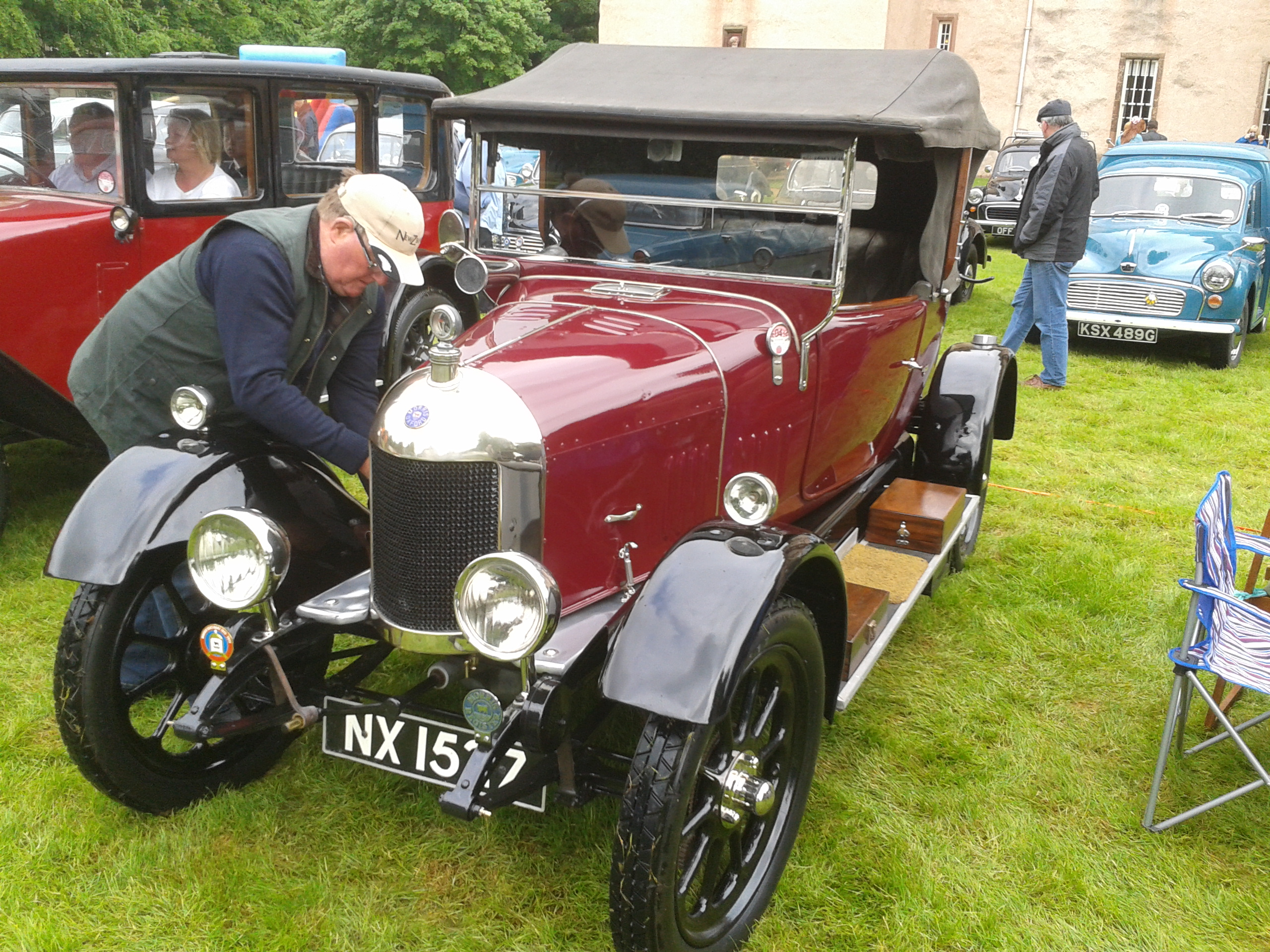
Oxford two-seater

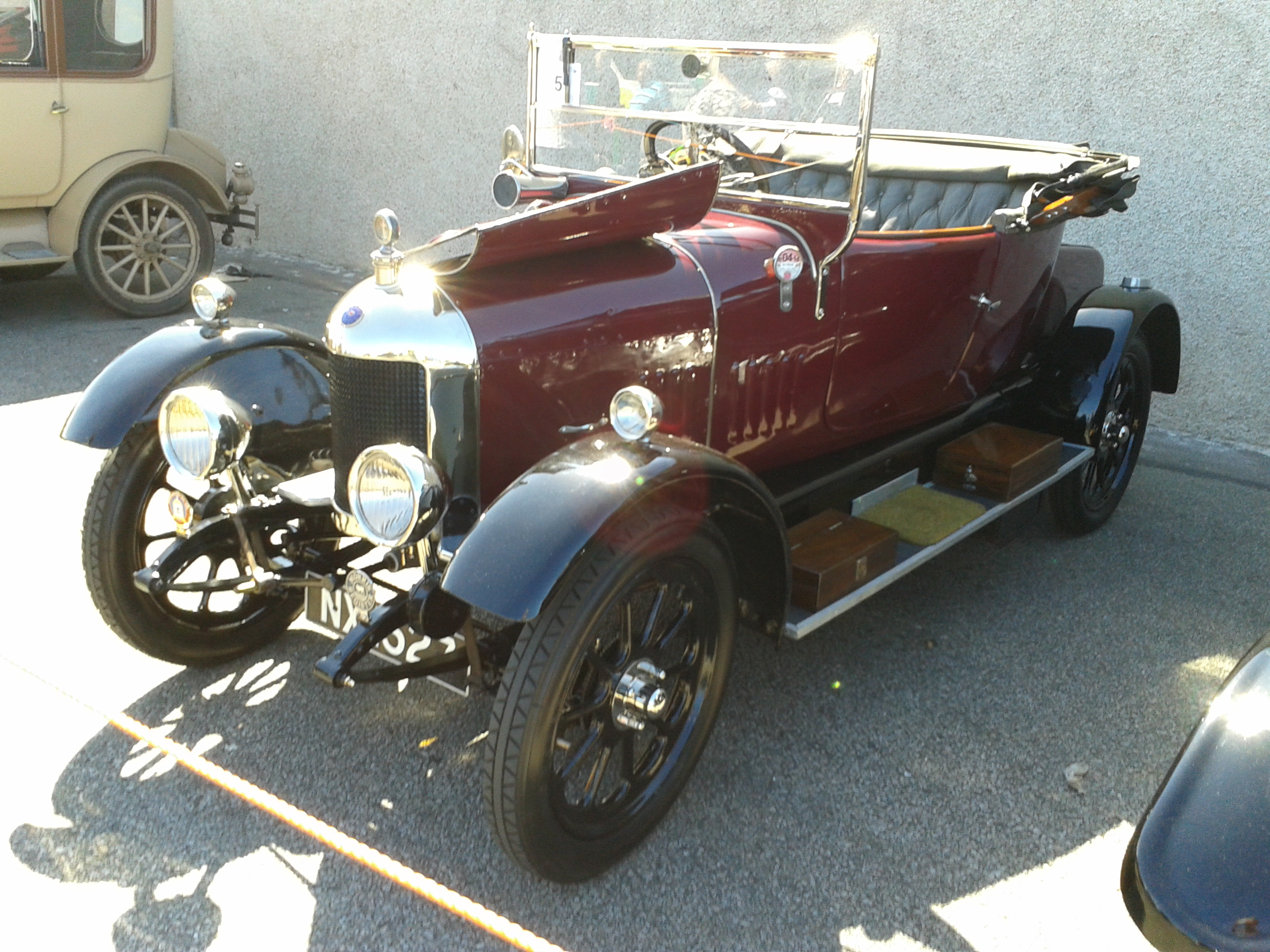
first registered March 1923

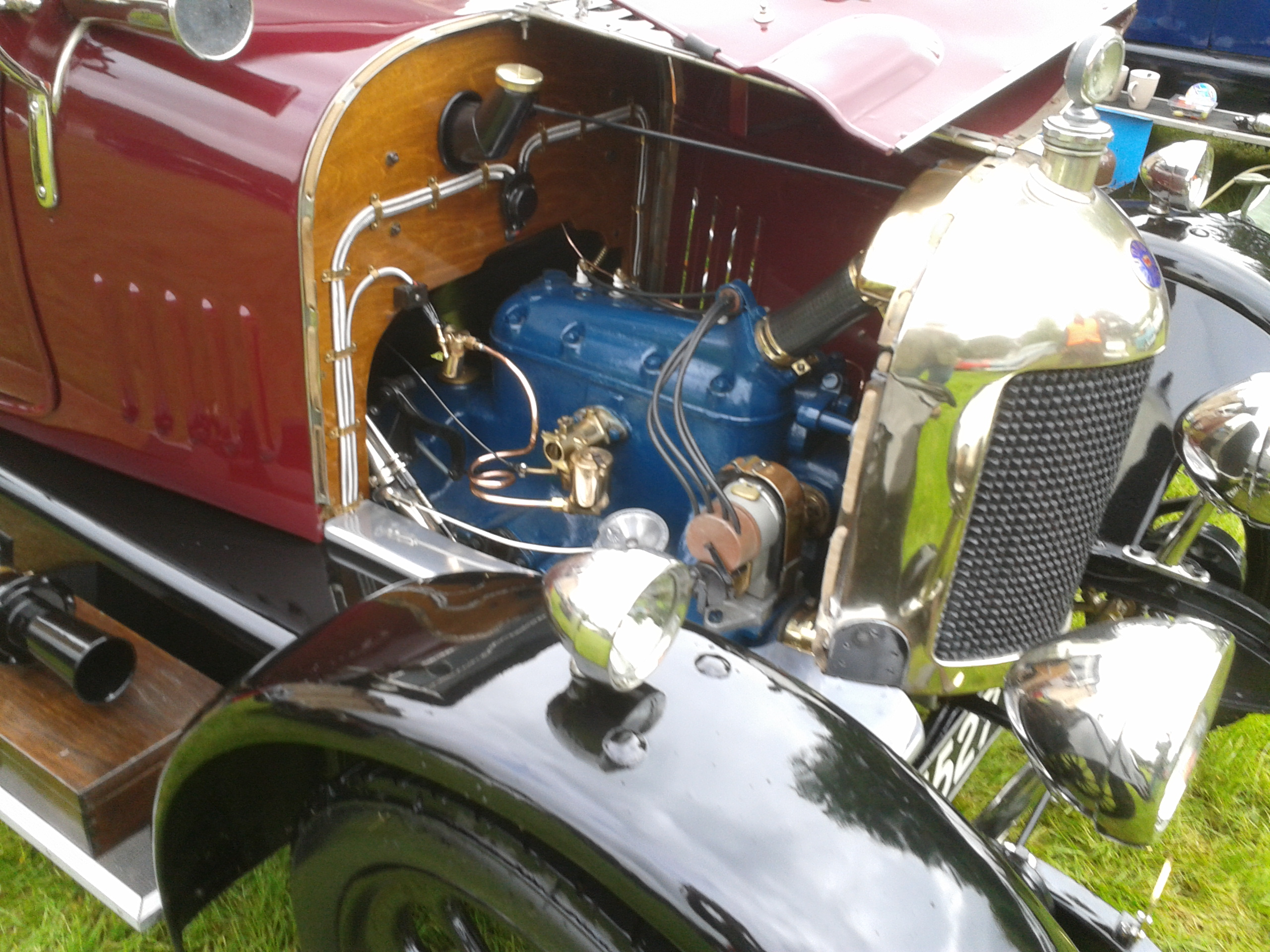
its 1548 cc 11.9 hp engine

=== 14/28 ===
In 1923 the engine was enlarged to 13.9 fiscal horsepower, displacing 1802 cc. This became known as the 14/28 engine. In 1925 it got a longer wheelbase chassis to move it further from the Cowley, and four-wheel brakes. This model of the Oxford would be the basis of the first MG, the 14/28 Super Sports.

Reviewed by The Times in March 1924 the enlarged engine was reported to be "commendably flexible" and quiet. It seemed to enjoy being made to turn over at high speed and that happened easily, certainly it had plenty of "courage". The oil filler's lid holds a dipper rod and forms a breather but there is still no filter at this point. The main strainer can only be withdrawn after removing a plug in the bottom of the sump. The clutch was good. There is no safety stop for reverse but the gear box was pronounced the chief delight on the car, it is "simple, quiet and expeditious". The accelerator is too sensitive. As before the brake handle was too far away. The car was "easy to travel in". Difficult to avoid on an 8' 6" wheelbase but passengers' coats sweep dusty or muddy wings on entry and exit. The dynamotor (starter-dynamo) sings (gently) at speed. For the price the equipment is very full.

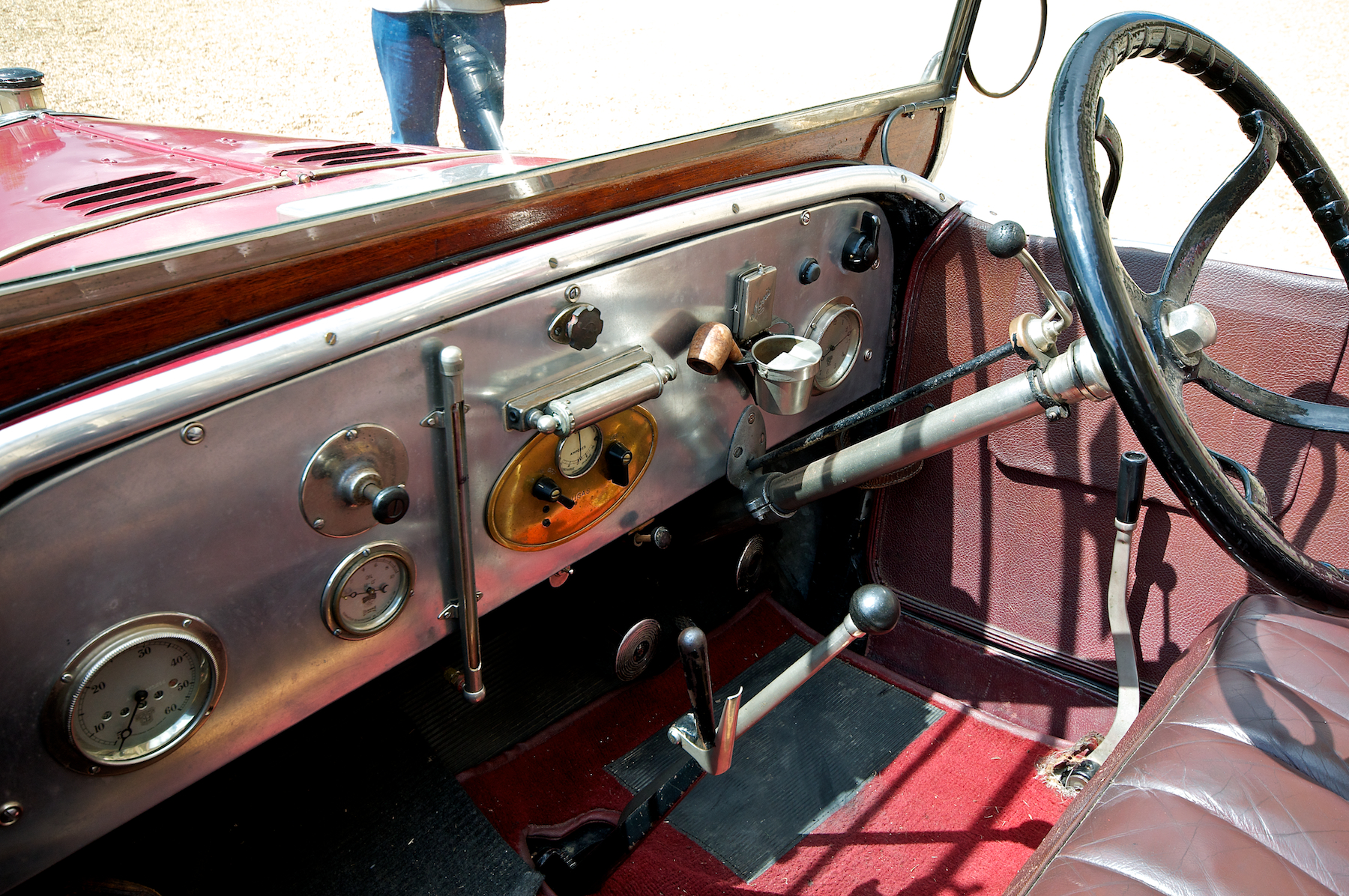
Floor L to R, the 'distant' handbrake, the 'interfering' change-speed lever and the under-wheel spark control. Before the steering column is a smokers' companion and the dash displays a fuel gauge piped from the tank in the scuttle behind it

At the next October's Olympia Motor Show the cars were shown with front wheel brakes, to a design by Rubury, as an optional extra at £10. The brake pedal now applied all four-wheel brakes, a separate hand lever controlled brakes at the rear. The list of accessories provided as standard equipment now extended to a 12 months full insurance policy. The reporter advised the driver's entrance appeared somewhat cramped. The claimed brake horsepower was 30.

At the Motor Show 1925 the 14/28 power output was reported to be 34 bhp and four-wheel brakes were standard, the same car had Barker dipping headlamps and thermostatic control of its engine's cooling water.

The Times tried the 14/28 again and reported to its readers in mid January 1926 that while there may now be better designs of light car the 14/28 represented great value for money and still came with insurance for its first twelve months. A petrol gauge on the dash and an "automatic screen wiper", two horns and a proper rear windscreen. There was still no filter in the oil filler. The same complaints were made as in previous reports yet the car's general behaviour on the road was considered "praiseworthy".

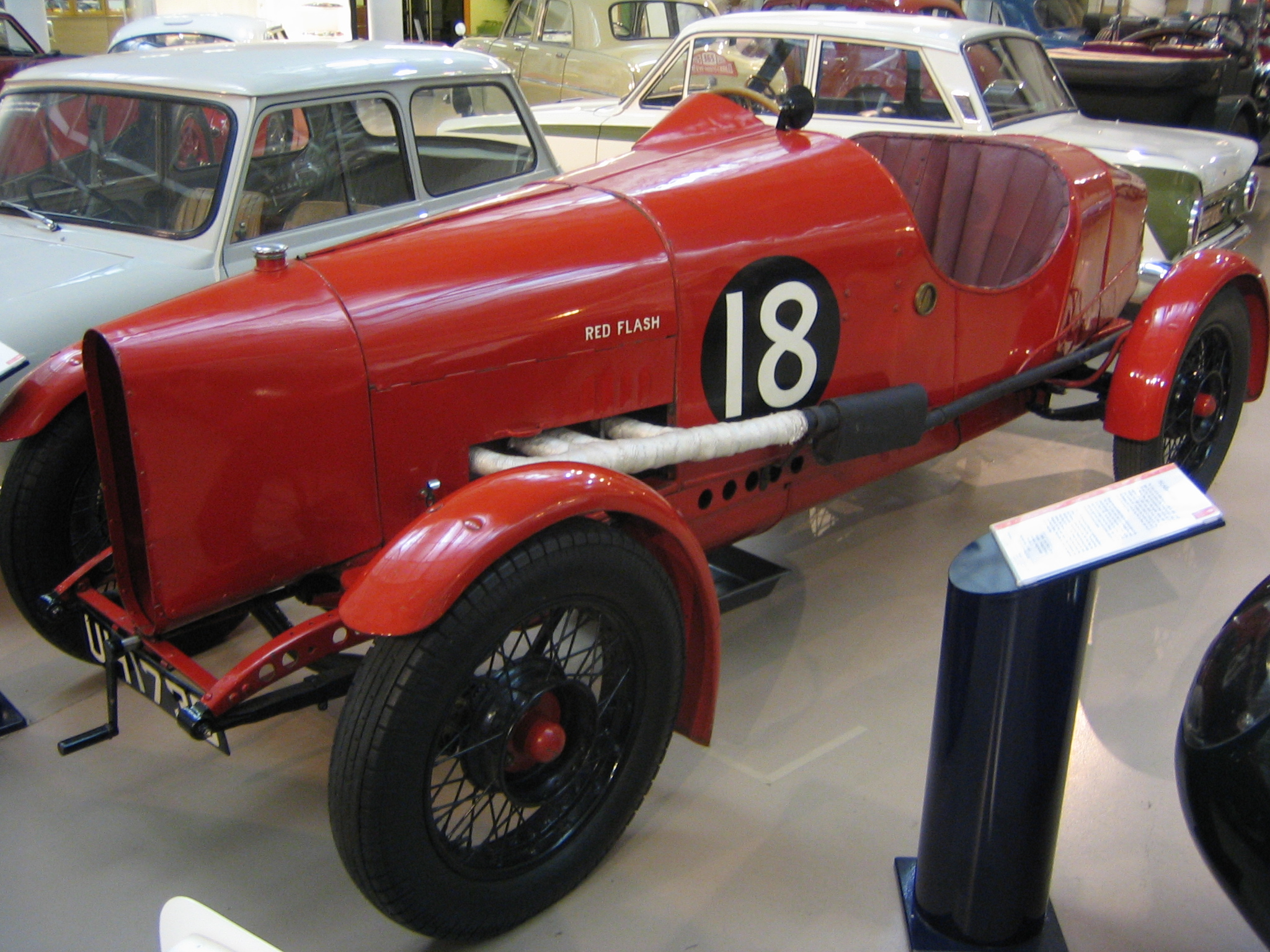
Red Flash 1925 Brooklands racing special

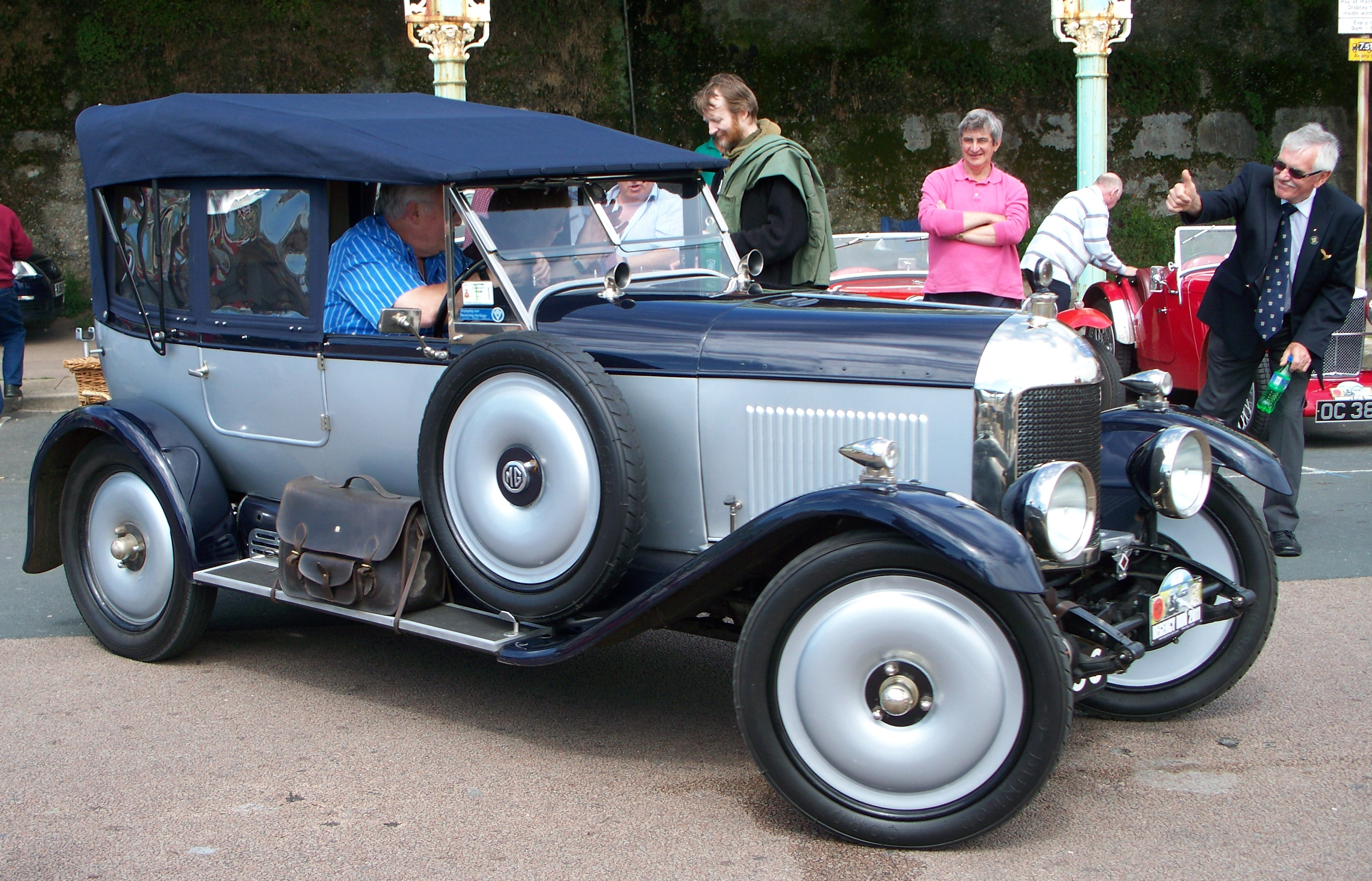
Morris Oxford MG 14/28 Super Sports 1925

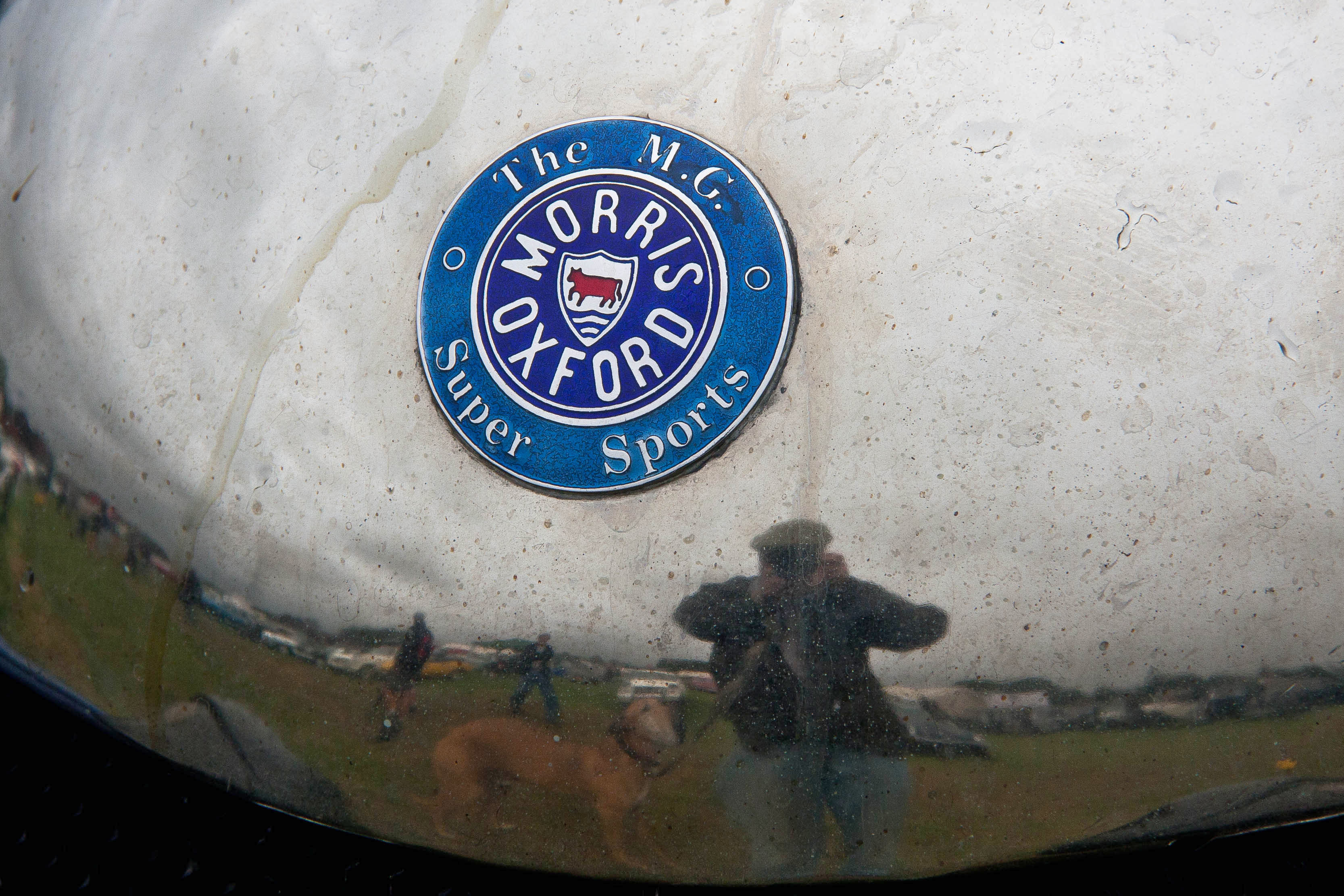
Morris Oxford MG 14/28 Super Sports 1925

== Production numbers ==
Year	1913	1914	1915	1916	1917	1918	1919	1920	1921	1922	1923	1924	1925	1926	Total
Production	393	907	320	697	126	198	360	1,932	3,077	6,937	20,024	32,939	54,151	32,183	154,244
