= Morris Oxford flatnose =

The "flatnose" Morris Oxford is a series of motor car models produced by Morris of the United Kingdom from 1926 until 1930. Introduced as a replacement for the Morris Oxford bullnose, the "flatnose" Oxford models featured more traditional styling.

== Oxford flatnose 1926–30 ==
Oxford flatnose
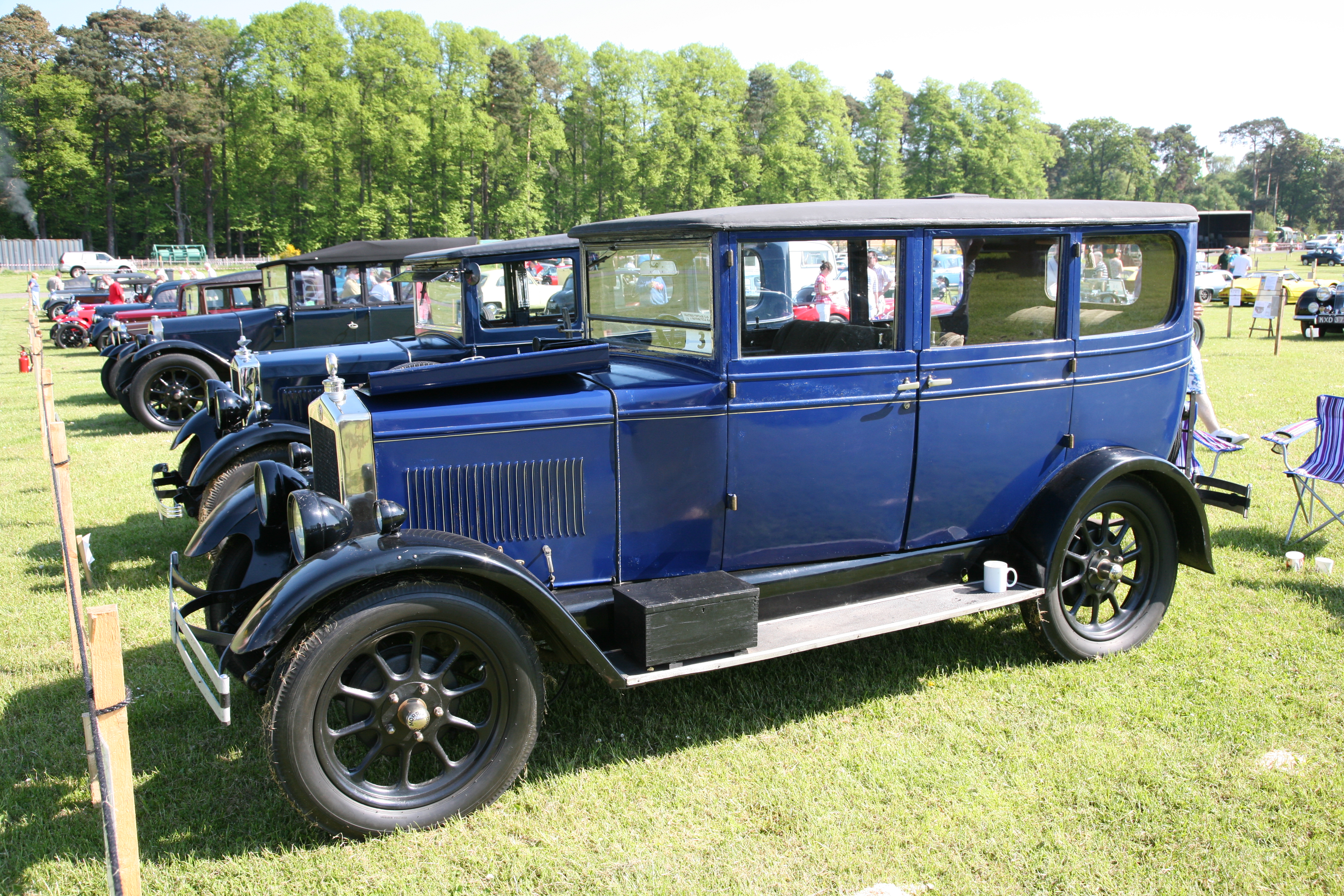
- Oxford 4-door saloon 1927

Overview
- Manufacturer: Morris Motors
- Production: 1926–1930; 32,282 made.

Body and chassis
- Class: Small car
- Body style: open tourer 2 or 4-door; 4-door coachbuilt saloon; 4-door fabric saloon; 2-seater drophead coupé; chassis only

Powertrain
- Engine: 1,802 cc (110.0 cu in) I4

Dimensions
- Wheelbase: 106.5 in (2,705 mm)

Chronology
- Predecessor: Morris Oxford bullnose
- Successor: Morris Oxford Six

The distinctive bullnose radiator was dropped in 1926 in an updated version of the car. The engines remained the same but a new range of bodies was offered including all-steel saloons.

The frame was changed to allow half-elliptic springs to be fitted in place of the old three-quarter elliptic springs. The back end of the frame was given a deeper channel section, it now sweeps up over the rear axle. The frame also receives bracing from the running board brackets and cross hangers.

The radiator cooling surface has been increased sixty per cent and the whole assembly given the flat-fronted shape which would lead to this car's popular name.

A new all-steel dash or bulkhead now creates a firm location for bodywork and a solid support for the petrol tank. As part of that redesign a new instrument panel is provided with neatly grouped meters and glove boxes either side. The hand controls on the steering column have been upgraded. There is now a dash-operated ventilator.

Equipment now includes:

- dash-operated ventilator
- adjustable shock absorbers
- luggage grid
- dipping headlamps
- non-glare instrument illumination

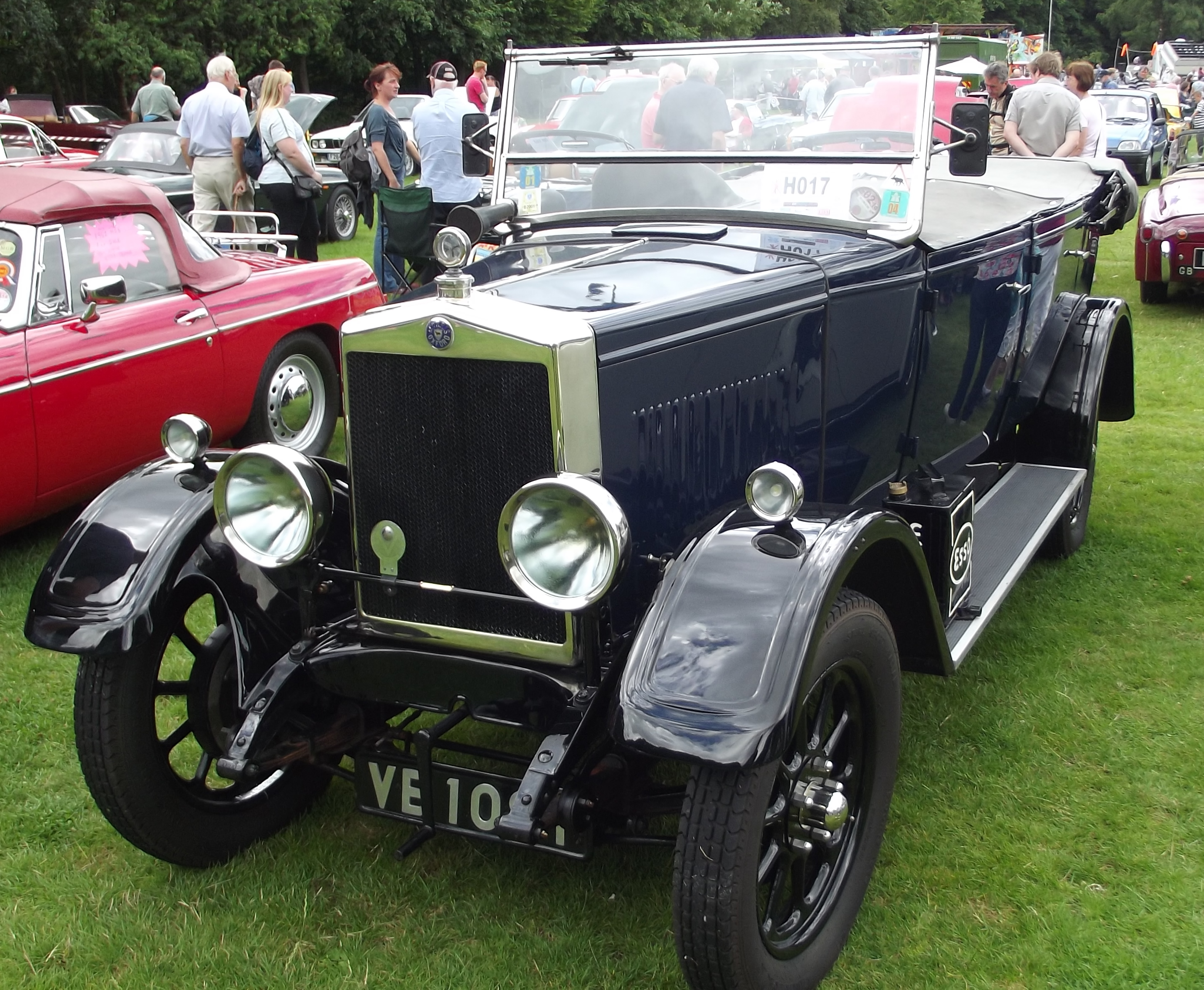
4-door tourer registered October 1927

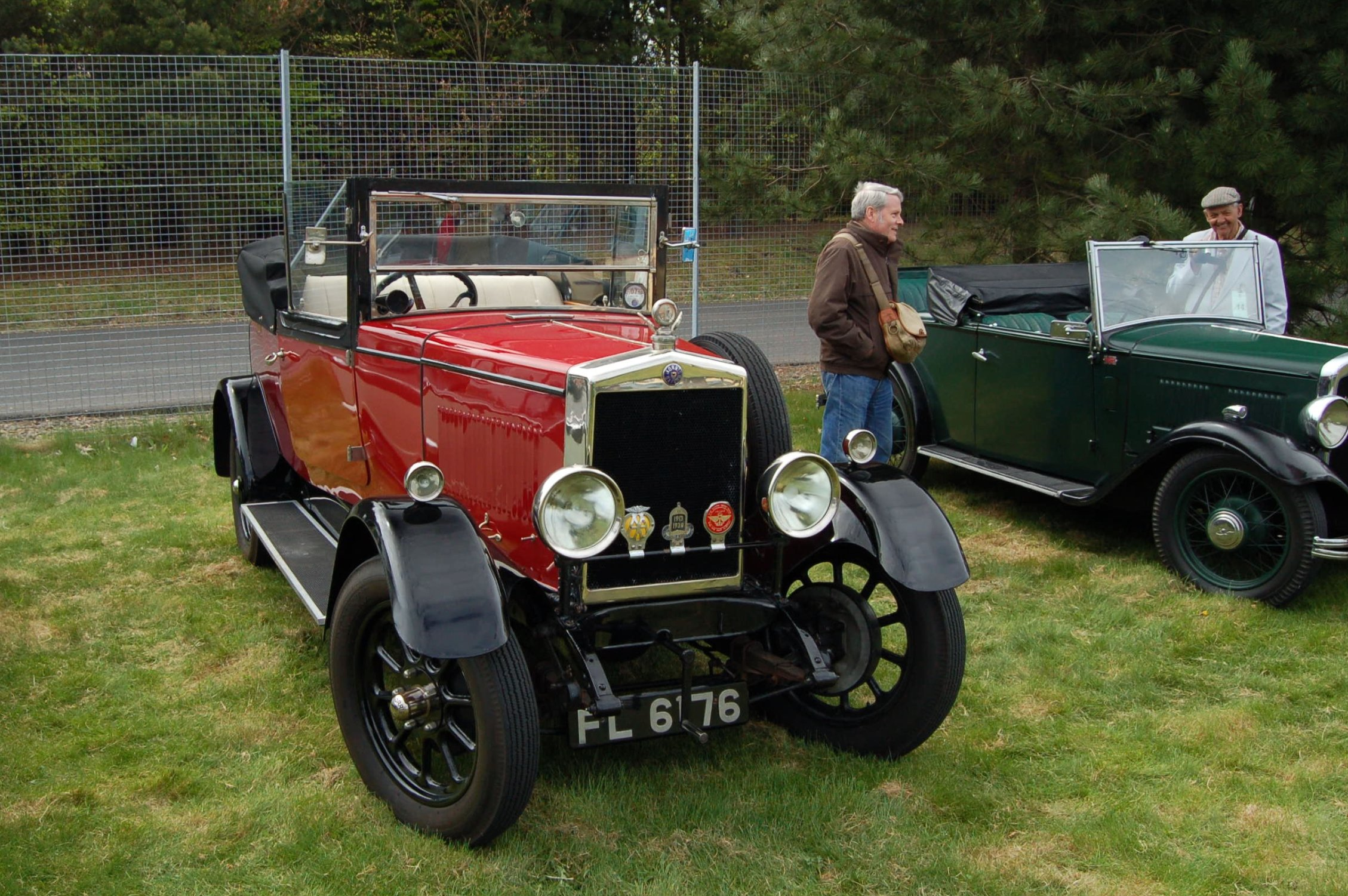
2-seater drophead coupé registered Jun 1927
