= Morris Engines =

Morris Engines Limited was located in Coventry, England. It specialised in the mass production of engines and gearboxes for vehicles made by W. R. Morris's businesses, later known as the Nuffield Organization. Morris Engines Ltd. was, therefore, partly responsible for Morris Motors Ltd. becoming Britain's leading motor manufacturer.

== Early years ==
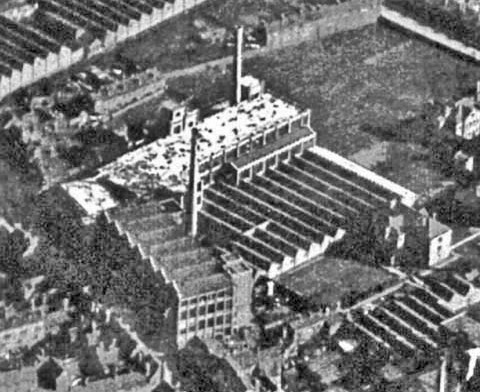
Morris Engines Ltd., Gosford Street, Coventry in 1923. Source: P.J. Seymour, 2008

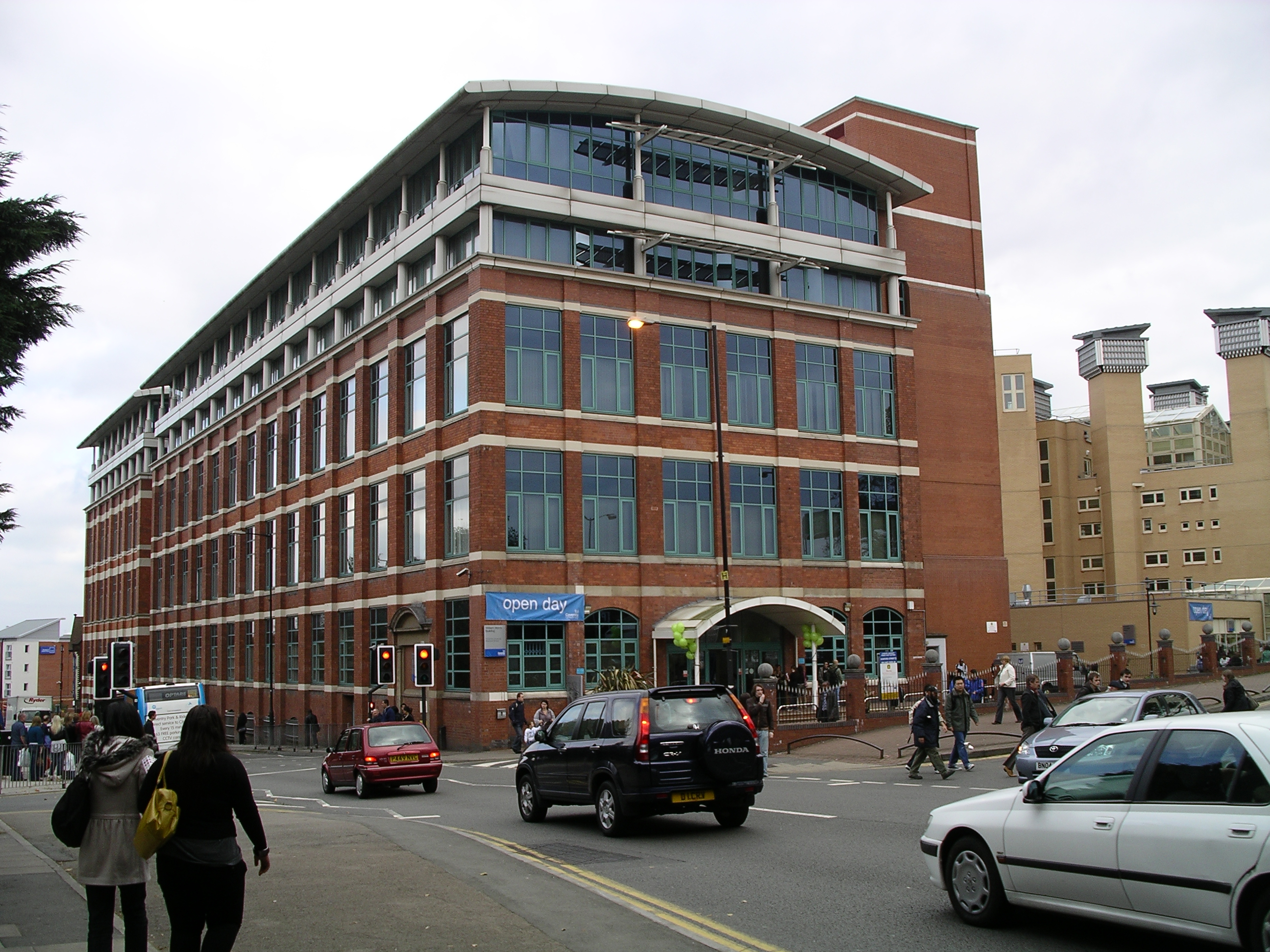
Part of the former Morris Engines factory in Gosford Street, Coventry The William Morris Building Coventry University. (photo 2007)

The Hotchkiss company of France, who were makers of the famous machine gun, hurriedly transferred production to England during World War I when it looked as if their St. Denis factory near Paris was going to be overrun by the Germans. Consequently, a factory was erected at Gosford Street, Coventry, and both machines and key staff were brought over to England so that production could start as soon as possible.

At the end of the War in 1918, the factory suddenly became short of work so Hotchkiss agreed to manufacture engines and gearboxes, copied from American designs, for Morris Motors Ltd. Delivery of these power units started mid 1919 and they were fitted into "Bullnose" Morris Cowleys and Morris Oxfords. By 1922, the supply of power units was just sufficient to meet the level of production of Morris cars, so W.R. Morris (later Lord Nuffield), the founder and owner of Morris Motors Ltd., asked Hotchkiss to raise production. However, Hotchkiss refused saying that they were unwilling to make more than 300 power units per week, because an expansion in England would have needed capital that they preferred to use in France.

After some negotiations, Morris himself bought the Hotchkiss plant and premises for £349,423 (about £15 million at 2009 values) in January 1923 and the business was renamed Morris Engines Ltd. Morris immediately set about a reorganisation and to carry out this task, he appointed F.G. Woollard, who had been known to Morris since 1910, as general manager. Woollard had risen to the position of assistant managing director of E G Wrigley & Co. Ltd., another Morris supplier, which Morris bought from the Receiver in January 1924 and the business was renamed Morris Commercial Cars Ltd. Woollard was already a successful pioneer in the techniques of mass and flow production and the results he achieved at the Gosford Street factory were largely due to his expertise in managing men and machines.

== Expansion ==
Morris invested another £300,000 in extending the Gosford Street factory and in buying new machines. Having re-organised engine production from batch to flow, Woollard introduced a 24-hour working day, by introducing a 3 shift system of 8 hours each, for a 5-day week. Production increased from less than 300 power units per week in January 1923, to 600 units per week in December of that year and to a remarkable 1200 units per week in December 1924.

The engine manufacturing process started when cylinder blocks arrived from one of the supplying foundries, one of which was Morris's own. After being inspected, pickled, washed and dried, the blocks were placed on a hand-transfer machining line that carried out 53 operations in turn. The process took 223 minutes and a completed block was being produced every 4 minutes.

The cylinder block hand transfer line which carried out 53 machining operations in turn. Source: P.J. Seymour, 2008

The idea of the first hand-transfer machining line, which was operated by 21 men, evolved in 1923. Then, in 1924, the first automated transfer machine was introduced for the production of gearbox cases, which were moved from station to station by compressed air. A second automated transfer machine, for the production of flywheels, was also set up in 1924. These machines were something Morris Engines Ltd. were justifiably proud of and they encouraged the public to see the process. American engineers judged the production systems to be 20 years ahead of their time.

Although the hand-transfer machining line remained in use for many years, the automated transfer machines were subsequently divided into individual machine units, as the automatic systems proved to be over complicated for technology of the time. However, Woollard had pioneered a process which is now commonplace.

In June 1926, W.R. Morris restructured the ownership of some of his holdings. Morris Motors Ltd., together with several other companies owned by W.R. Morris, were acquired by a new public listed company, Morris Motors (1926) Ltd., which issues Preference shares to the public. W.R. Morris became the sole Ordinary shareholder of the new company, over which he therefore retained full control and, as a result of the change in ownership, Morris Engines Ltd. became Morris Motors (1926) Ltd., Engines Branch. The (1926) was dropped from the company's name in 1929.

Situated as it was in a congested area of Coventry, the Gosford Street factory site had little space for expansion on horizontal lines, so a six-storey extension was constructed. As further expansion, to meet the rising demand for power units, was foreseen, Morris purchased a 45-acre (180,000 m^{2}) site north of Coventry at Courthouse Green in 1927 and a mechanised foundry, together with the machining of cylinder blocks, was set up there.

== 1930s engine production ==
During the mid-1930s, new buildings were erected at Courthouse Green, into which personnel and machinery were transferred from the Gosford Street factory and from Wolseley Motors Ltd. With the exception of those built by Morris Commercial Cars Ltd. for their heavy trucks, the Courthouse Green factory of Morris Motors Ltd. Engines Branch then specialized in making power units for cars and light commercial vehicles made by the entire Morris group of companies; notably, Morris Motors Limited, The M.G. Car Company Limited, Morris Commercial Cars Limited and Wolseley Motors Limited.

During the late 1930s, the Courthouse Green factory was turning out over 3,000 power units per week and throughout the Second World War, it was working flat-out making engines for fire pumps, ambulances, military vehicles, lifeboats and tanks, as well as components for aero engines and for Rotol variable pitch air screws. The factory suffered extensive damage during a bombing raid on Coventry in 1940 but production restarted within six weeks of the raid, even though some of its workforce were having to work in the open air as much of the factory's roof had been blown off and had still not been replaced. After the War, Morris Motors Ltd., Engines Branch, reverted to making power units for vehicles made by the Nuffield Organization and its factory became part of British Motor Corporation when Morris Motors Limited merged with The Austin Motor Company Limited in 1952.

== See also ==
- William Morris, 1st Viscount Nuffield
- Morris Motors Limited
- Hotchkiss et Cie
- Frank George Woollard
