= Frank George Woollard =

British mechanical engineer

Frank George Woollard MBE (22 September 1883 – 22 December 1957) was a British mechanical engineer who worked for nearly three decades in the British motor industry in various roles in design, production, and management. He was a pioneer in flow production, what is better known as the "Toyota Production System" (popularly -- but incorrectly -- referred to as "Lean management"), but whose work has been forgotten.

Frank George Woollard, ca. 1954. Source: David Bramley Archive. Used with permission.

== Biography ==
Woollard is regarded as one of the fathers of the British motor industry for his major contributions to flow production, progressive management practices, and industrial automation. In 1918, Woollard was awarded Member of Order of the British Empire (MBE) for his work on in improving the design and production of tank gearboxes, which had been the bottleneck in tank production during World War I. Woollard's innovative work at Morris Engines Limited, later known as Morris engines branch, beginning in 1923, enabled Morris Motors Limited to grow rapidly and achieve a commanding 34 percent domestic market share by 1930.

Born in London, England, his father George was a butler and his mother Emily (Powell) was a kitchen maid, Woollard was educated at City of London School where he excelled in mathematics and science. In 1914, Woollard married Catherine Elizabeth Richards, and they gave birth to a son who died in infancy and daughter Joan Elizabeth on 20 September 1916. Miss Joan Woollard died on 30 January 2008.

== Professional career ==
Upon completing his education at City of London School, Woollard apprenticed for five years as a mechanical engineer at the London and South Western Railway starting in 1899. His first experience with a basic form of flow production was in the manufacture of railway coaches in 1904. Around 1905 he entered the British automotive industry as an auto parts designer. In 1910 he joined E G Wrigley & Co Limited, Birmingham, a maker of gearboxes, axles, and steering components for various British automobile companies, as chief draughtsman in a department with a professional staff of 18, then in 1914 Woollard assumed responsibilities as production engineer. He re-organized production from batch to a simple form of flow to meet increased orders for vehicle components. In January 1918 he was appointed assistant managing director of Wrigley's.

William Morris, later Lord Nuffield, founder and owner of Morris Motors, became acquainted with Woollard as a customer of E G Wrigley & Co. Morris recognised Woollard's talents in automobile parts design and production and when Morris purchased the E G Wrigley business in January 1923 he appointed Woollard general manager of Morris Engines Limited. Woollard, with William Morris's encouragement and financial backing, immediately led the re-organization of engine production from batch to flow, increasing output from less than 300 units per week in January 1923, to 600 units per week by December 1923, and to 1200 units by December 1924. To achieve this remarkable increase in output, Woollard developed an advanced flow production system for low volume production.

The major changes in production system design took place quickly, over a period of less than two years. In comparison, reorganisation of Toyota's engine shop, some 25 years later in the 1950s, took six years – and at half the production volume of Morris Motors. In 1926 Woollard joined the main board of Morris Motors but following disagreements with W R Morris who kept a firm grip on policy he moved on to managing director of Rudge-Whitworth in 1932. From 1936 he seemed unable to find employment with the major vehicle manufacturers but he returned to writing, took up some industry directorships and became active at the University of Birmingham and Birmingham College of Technology. He chaired the College of Technology's industrial administration group from 1951 to 1957.

His innovative methods seemed little appreciated by the industry though he was active and it would seem respected in his professional associations which included:

IAE President 1945–1947 of the Institution of Automobile Engineers – which he had joined in 1915
IME first chairman, automobile division of the Institution of Mechanical Engineers – he arranged the merger of IAE and IME in 1947
Member of the Institution of Production Engineers
Chairman executive committee of the Aluminium Development Association 1949–1952
Chairman Zinc Alloy Diecasting Association 1952–1956
founding member of British Institute of Management
Member of the American Society of Automotive Engineers

He died of heart failure in the Queen Elizabeth Hospital, Edgbaston, Birmingham on 22 December 1957.

Woollard's flow production system was remarkably similar to current-day Toyota Production System, and used most features of Toyota's roduction system methods and processes. This included (using current terminology): U-shaped cells, multi-skilled workers, takt time, standardised work, Just-in-time manufacturing, supermarkets, autonomation, quick change-over, etc.

As a result, Woollard was able to prove, prior to Toyota, that achieving flow in lower volume production resulted in costs that were as low or lower than that which could be achieved by Ford's large scale production system.

He was also the first to develop mechanical materials handling equipment known as automatic transfer machines to facilitate flow production, which some 25 years later would become common in the global automotive industry. Overall, Woollard's contribution to progressive manufacturing management practices is substantial and comparable to Taiichi Ohno at Toyota. He was a great early 20th century pioneer in progressive management, flow production, and industrial automation.

== Significance of Woollard's work ==
Woollard's application of flow production beginning in 1923 means that timelines for discoveries and attributions of key accomplishments in flow production must be revised. For example, Kiichiro Toyoda is credited with creating Just-in-Time (JIT) production in 1937, while Taiichi Ohno is credited with inventing "supermarkets" in 1953 to supply downstream processes. These innovations were established and used in flow production by Woollard between 1923 and 1925. Other innovations, such as autonomation, appear to have been discovered independently by Sakichi Toyoda and Frank Woollard.

Woollard's work is important because he was not a technocrat solely interested in using new machines to replace men and increase productive output. He warned people that flow is the objective, and machinery can be helpful but is not necessary to achieve it. He also warned against falling in love with machinery for its own sake.

Woollard viewed factory workers as part of the production system, not separate from it, and gave them responsibilities that normally would have been handled by supervisors. He also allowed workers to participate in efforts to improve production processes which was innovative for its time, but was rudimentary and more limited compared to Toyota's systematic development of workers capabilities post-World War II. Further, Woollard understood that achieving flow in production activities alone was not enough; management and workers must work to connect all processes, from beginning to end, to achieve flow throughout the enterprise.

Woollard clearly understood the idea and practice of continuous improvement in a flow environment, saying: "the virtue of flow production lies in the fact that it brings all inconsistencies into the light of day and so provides the opportunity for correcting them," and "[the] high visibility conferred on the company's activities by flow production will lead to unceasing and continuous improvement" (Woollard, 1954, p. 87).

Additionally, Woollard understood that to achieve flow production, management practice had to be non-zero-sum, meaning that workers had to be respected and also benefit from flow production, in addition to customers. He recognised that in order for flow to exist, the interests of key stakeholders cannot be marginalised. Flow must cause no harm; if it does, then material and information will not flow. Woollard understood and practised what today we call "Continuous Improvement" and "Respect for People" – the two principles of flow production, and embodied them in his 18 principles of flow production (Woollard, 1954, p. 51).

Woollard's work in flow production in the mid-to-late 1920s pre-dates Kiichiro Toyoda's interest in flow production by nearly 15 years. It is notable that Woollard's work was well publicised in technical automotive production and engineering journals. Papers written by Woollard and William Morris showed their strong desire to share the details of their innovative continuous flow production system with others and to showcase British industrial prowess. Their work was no secret and was readily available to anyone interested in learning about advanced automobile production methods.

== Woollard's legacy ==
Woollard wrote numerous journal papers and trade magazine articles on his flow production system in the mid-1920 and into the late 1940s and mid-1950s. His detailed technical papers were published in a widely read journal called Machinery. Those papers, as well as his 1954 book, Principles of Mass and Flow Production, fell into obscurity for reasons that are not at all clear.

Some scholars consider Woollard to be the forgotten pioneer of flow production. His work is completely missing from the Lean management literature and highlights a significant failure on the part of both Lean management researchers and production and operations management researchers.

Woollard died in late 1957, and so did his life's work. His daughter Joan was an accomplished artist and apparently did not have the capability to keep her father's work alive. Woollard's colleagues had tremendous admiration for him and his accomplishments, but they would eventually pass away and nobody carried his work forward until recently.

Woollard's work has been revived by management historian and author Professor Bob Emiliani. In January 2009 he published a 55th Anniversary Special Edition of Woollard's 1954 book, Principles of Mass and Flow Production, which also includes his 1925 paper "Some Notes on British Methods of Continuous Production" and commentary and analysis of Woollard's work by Dr. Emiliani.

Professor Bob Emiliani and his research collaborator, Peter J. Seymour wrote the peer-reviewed paper "Frank George Woollard: Forgotten Pioneer of Flow Production," published in the Journal of Management History, (2011) 17 (1): 66–87.

Morris Motors Ltd. ceased to exist in 1952 when it merged with Austin Motor Company to form British Motor Corporation. Unfortunately, innovations in production methods and machinery are not sufficient to ensure long-term company success. Managers and employees must excel at many other business processes including responding to the voice of the customer with new designs, short cycle-time product development, introducing new automotive technologies, aftermarket service, and so on. An advanced production system alone will not make a company successful long-term.
