= EG Wrigley and Company =

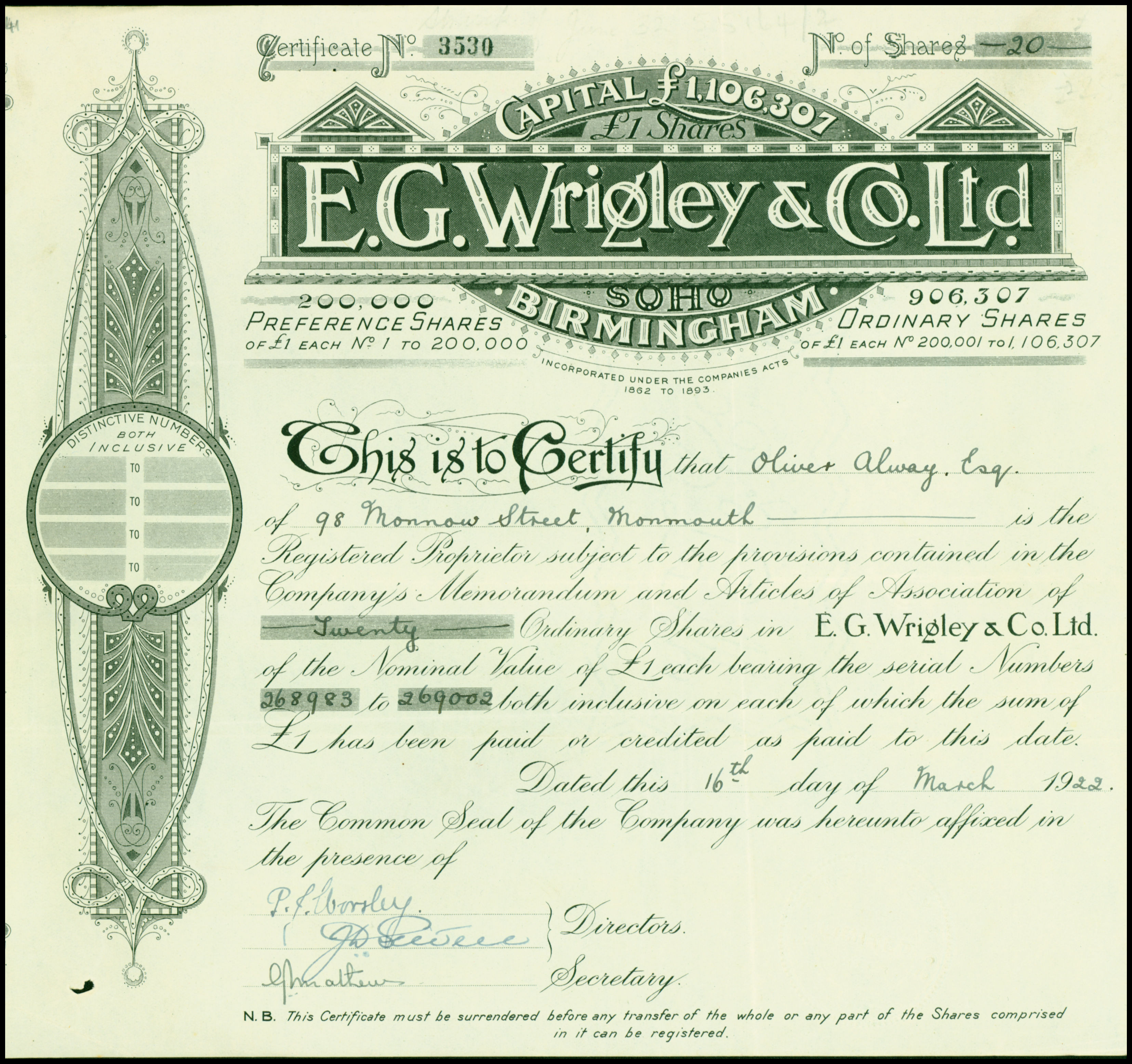
Share of the E. G. Wrigley & Co Limited, issued 16. March 1922

E G Wrigley & Co Limited was a British tool maker, car component, and mechanical parts manufacturer, located at Foundry Lane, Soho, Birmingham active from 1897 to 1923.

== Foundation ==
Edward Greenwood Wrigley established a tool making business at 232 Aston Road, Birmingham in 1898. He expanded in 1902 by moving some operations to Foundry Lane, Soho, Birmingham. They manufactured high-speed twist drills and made a specialty of milling cutters, taper and adjustable reamers and gear cutters.

=== Small tools and Gears ===
In addition to the small tools mentioned Wrigley's made gears of many types for all mechanisms but the engine and they assembled gears into boxes making a number of products. Their reputation for high quality was excellent though Dr Lanchester went on record as saying the one use for a Wrigley Worm was for fishing.

=== Transmission sets ===
A range of three speed gearboxes and worm-driven back axles with propeller shaft and torque mechanism and transmission brakes and front axles with steering gear. In 1906 Wrigley's showed a complete car gearbox at that year's Olympia Show and were manufacturing front and live-rear axles.

== Developments ==
In 1912 at the opening of a new building at Soho Foundry Lane core activities were:

- Manufacture of twist drills, cutters and small tools of all kinds
- the machining of toothed gearing
- assembly of gearboxes and other complete units

Other special tools made in large numbers were: hobs, metal-splitting saws and all kinds of special cutters and gauges. At that time it was reported there were now eighteen draughtsmen, 47 staff and 280 men in the workshops.

After the war, due to ill health, Wrigley handed over the running of his business to F G Woollard. Wrigley died in January 1941.

=== Cars ===
Wrigley cars were only made during 1913. In 1913 they began experimenting with a cyclecar with a two-cylinder, air- or water-cooled engine and two-speed gearbox. Very few were built before the business was involved in war work, including making aircraft parts.

== Morris Commercial Cars ==
Wrigley's continued building, among other products, axles and gearboxes. In early 1920 they issued shares to take control of engine-maker J. Tylor and Sons who were supplying engines to Angus-Sanderson which was intending to move to large scale production. However Angus-Sanderson overstretched themselves, and Wrigley stopped supplying them in November 1920. Angus-Sanderson failed in 1921, this forced Tylor into receivership. Wrigley's had to write off its shareholding in both companies and for the year ending April 1921 reported a loss of £548,300. Wrigley's was not able to recover and was placed in receivership at the end of 1923. Although Angus-Sanderson was resurrected as Angus Sanderson (1921) Ltd (with control of J Tylor and Sons) it made relatively few cars, and failed in 1927.

The failure of Angus-Sanderson was in part due to being undercut by Morris, and on 1 January 1924 William Morris bought from the receiver the complete assets of Wrigley, including the buildings, and on 4 February of that year, the former Wrigley business, now incorporated as Morris Commercial Cars Limited, began the manufacture of light commercial vehicles with a 1-ton truck. By 1930 trucks of from 10 cwt up to 5 tons capacity were being made and Dictator and Imperial single and double-decker buses.

== See also ==
- List of car manufacturers of the United Kingdom
