= Morris Commercial Cars =

British automotive manufacturer

Morris Commercial
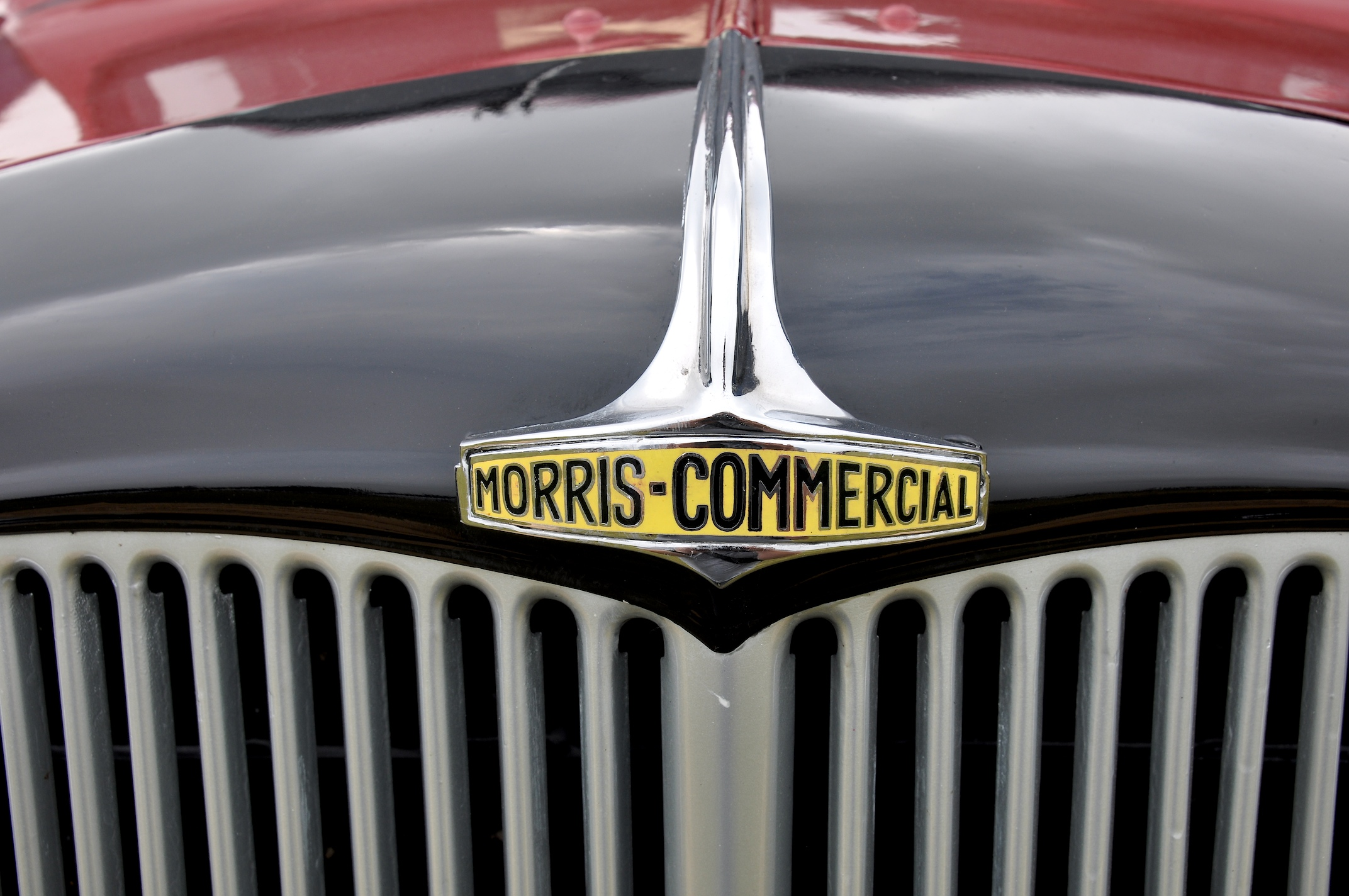
- Type: Automotive
- Industry: Automotive
- Predecessor: EG Wrigley and Company
- Founded: 1924 (Original) 2017 (Relaunch); 6 years ago
- Founder: William Morris
- Defunct: 1975; 51 years ago (Brand re-created in 2017)
- Fate: Brand incorporated into British Leyland Motor Corporation in 1968 and re-created in 2017
- Area served: Worldwide
- Products: Trucks buses vans military vehicles

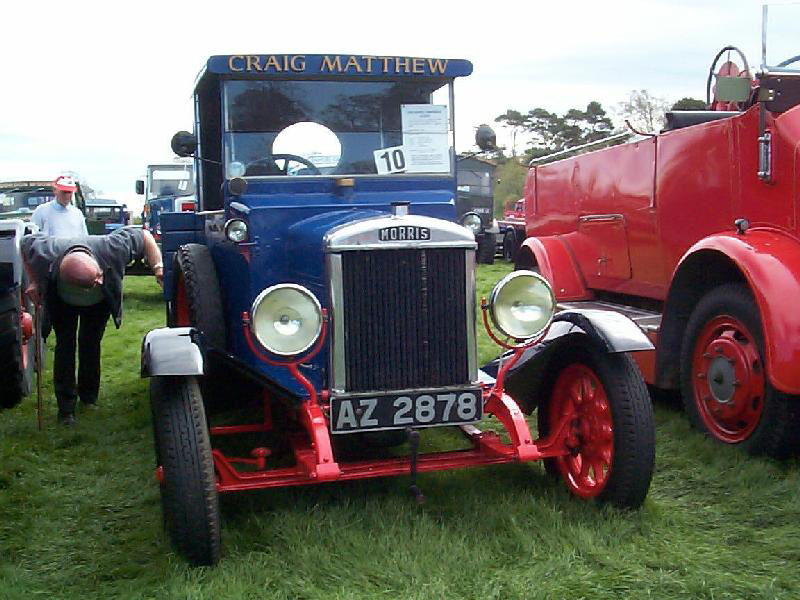

Morris Commercial Cars Limited is a British manufacturer of commercial vehicles formed by William Morris, founder of Morris Motors Limited, to continue the business of E G Wrigley and Company which he purchased as of 1 January 1924.

== History ==
Morris bought the assets of Soho, Birmingham axle manufacturer E.G. Wrigley and Company after it was placed in liquidation late in 1923. Up until that point a small number of commercial vehicle variants of Morris cars were built at the Morris plant at Cowley, but with the newly acquired plant in Foundry Lane, Soho, Birmingham serious production began.

In 1932 the business was moved a few miles across Birmingham to the former Wolseley factory in Adderley Park. As a response to success of the American-owned Ford and Bedford truck brands, in 1934 and 1935 the radiator badge incorporated the text "British to the Backbone". This somewhat jingoist design remained in use until the end of the war.

In 1936 Morris sold the company into his Morris Motors Limited. The use of the Morris Commercial brand name continued until 1968 when British Motor Holdings, by then the parent of Austin as well as Morris, merged with the Leyland Motor Corporation to form the British Leyland Motor Corporation.

In wartime commercial vehicles in the Morris range were produced for military use – such as the Morris C8 field artillery tractor (FAT) and Morris CS8 15 cwt truck. Morris Commercial also built vehicles such as the Terrapin amphibious carrier while Nuffield Mechanisations also built a number of armored vehicles.

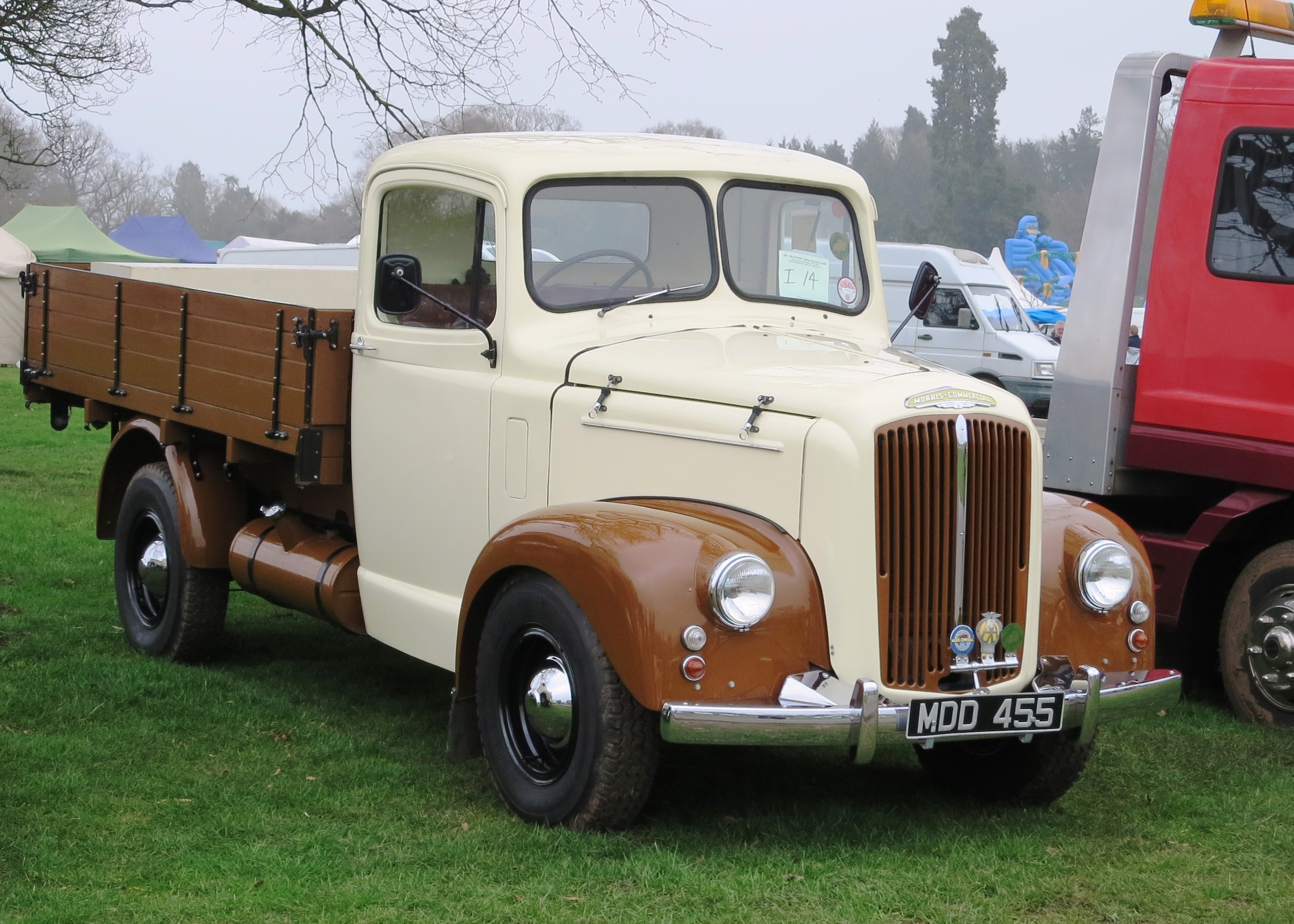
1953 Morris Commercial LC5

During the 1960s the light trucks and forward-control J4 light vans produced by Austin and Morris commercial were identical. The J4 was developed into the Sherpa in 1974 by British Leyland and later derivatives of this design survived well into the 2000s as the LDV Pilot/Convoy.

While production of the light vans remained concentrated on the Birmingham Adderley Park site, production of the F-series and W-series light trucks moved to Scotland with the opening in 1960 of the company's Bathgate plant. The Adderley Park plant was closed in 1971 and demolished shortly afterwards.

The light trucks in the 1960s included the FF, a forward-control design introduced in 1958, along with the WF which was a sibling vehicle with the driver placed behind the engine rather than on top of it. The updated version of the FF, the FJ, appeared in 1964; it featured a split-circuit braking system, a novelty in this class of vehicle. The FF remained in production and the two vehicles were offered side by side: in this class the BMC trucks were nevertheless out-competed in terms of domestic market sales volumes by Bedford and Ford (with their Thames). Austin/Morris commercial vehicles in the 1960s also included the Austin/Morris FG-series an unusual-looking urban delivery truck with driver doors set at an angle at the rear corners of the cab to permit access in confined spaces.

=== Production figures ===
Year	1924	1925	1926	1927
	2,312	6,256	labor strike ; few vehicles	9,562

=== Revival ===
The marque was re-launched in 2017 when a proposal for all-new electric J-Type was announced, which was unveiled in November 2019.

== Taxicabs ==
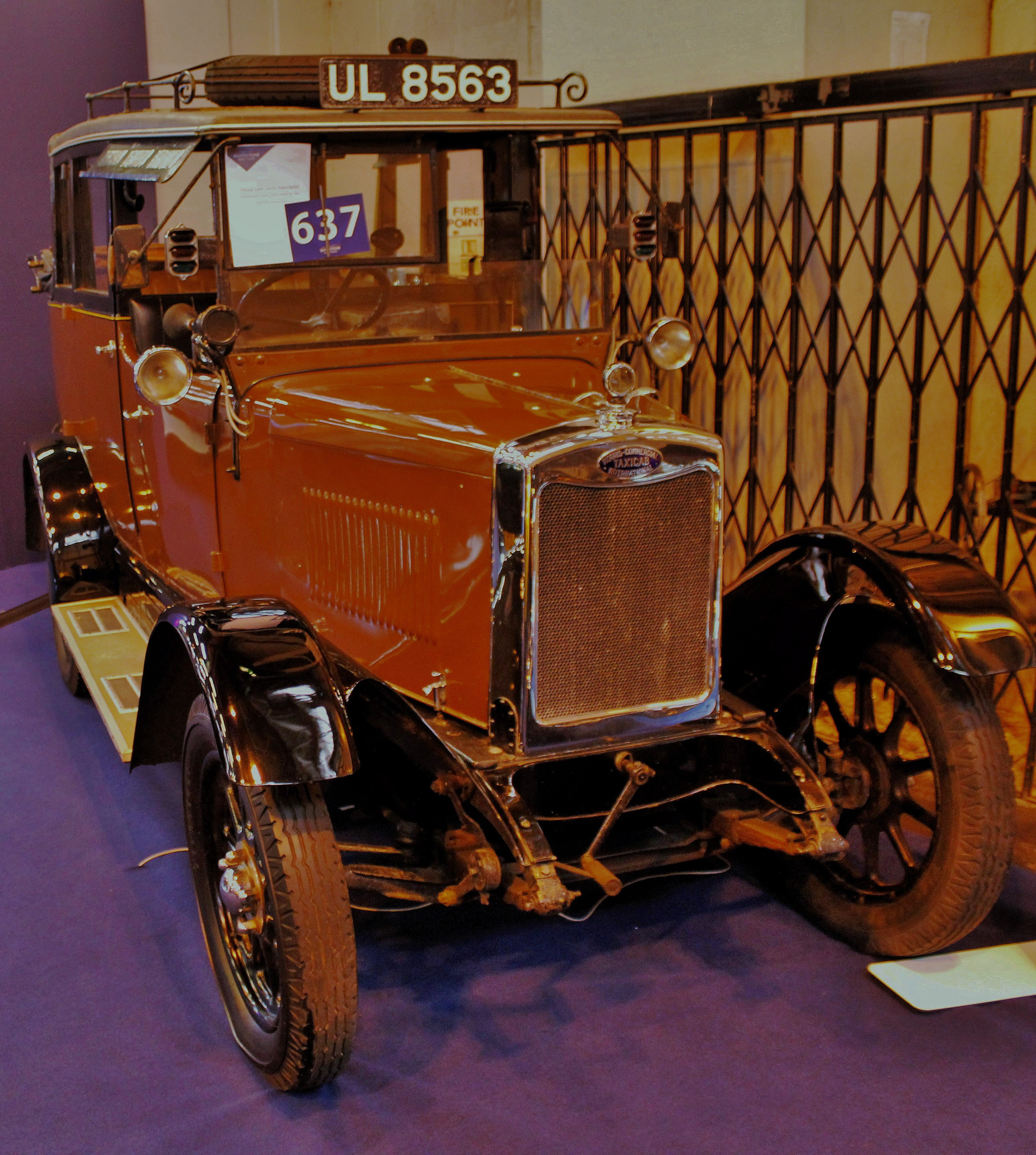
1929 Morris-Commercial International Taxicab Uncle Lima

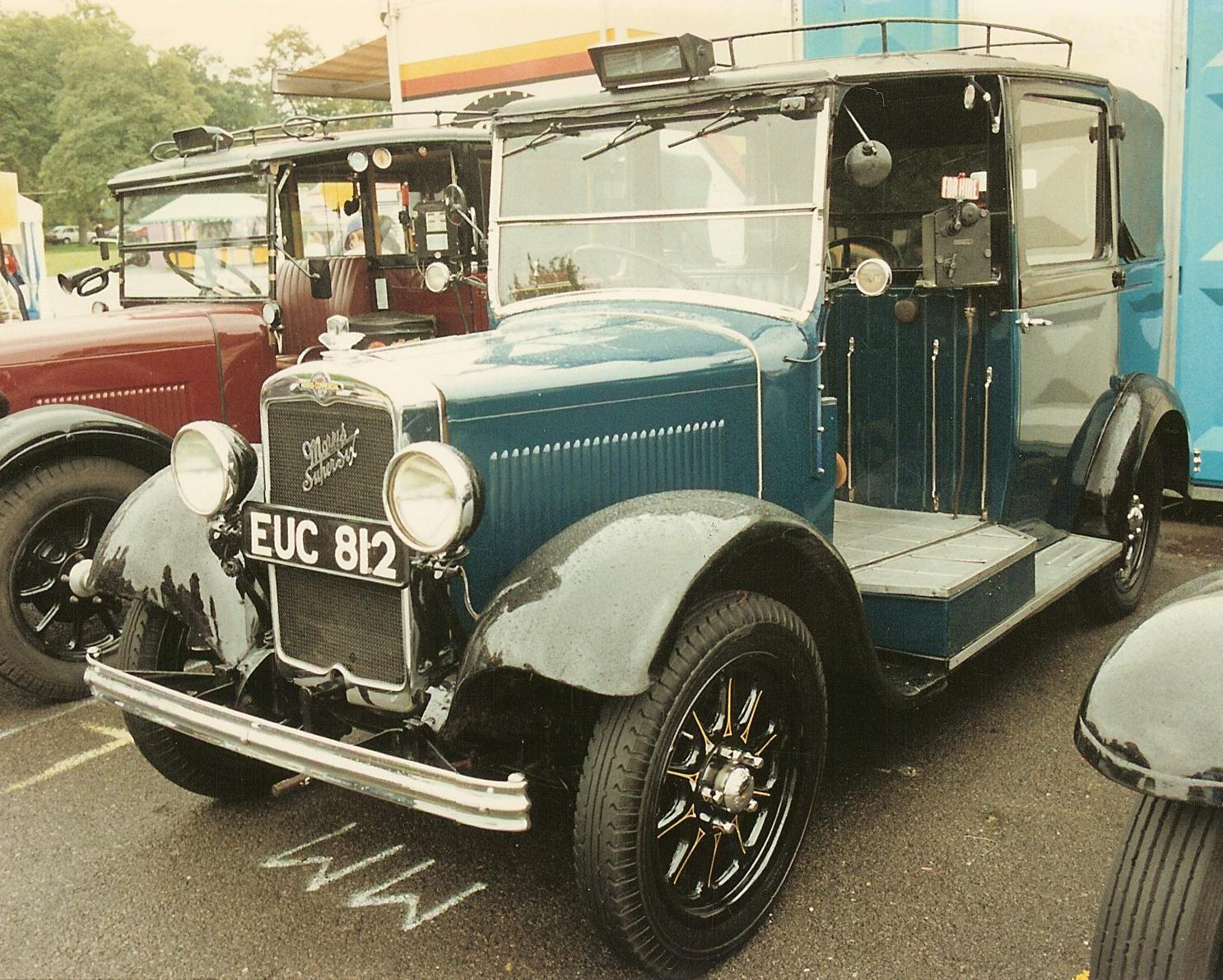
Morris-Commercial G2SW London Taxicab 2½-litre 1938

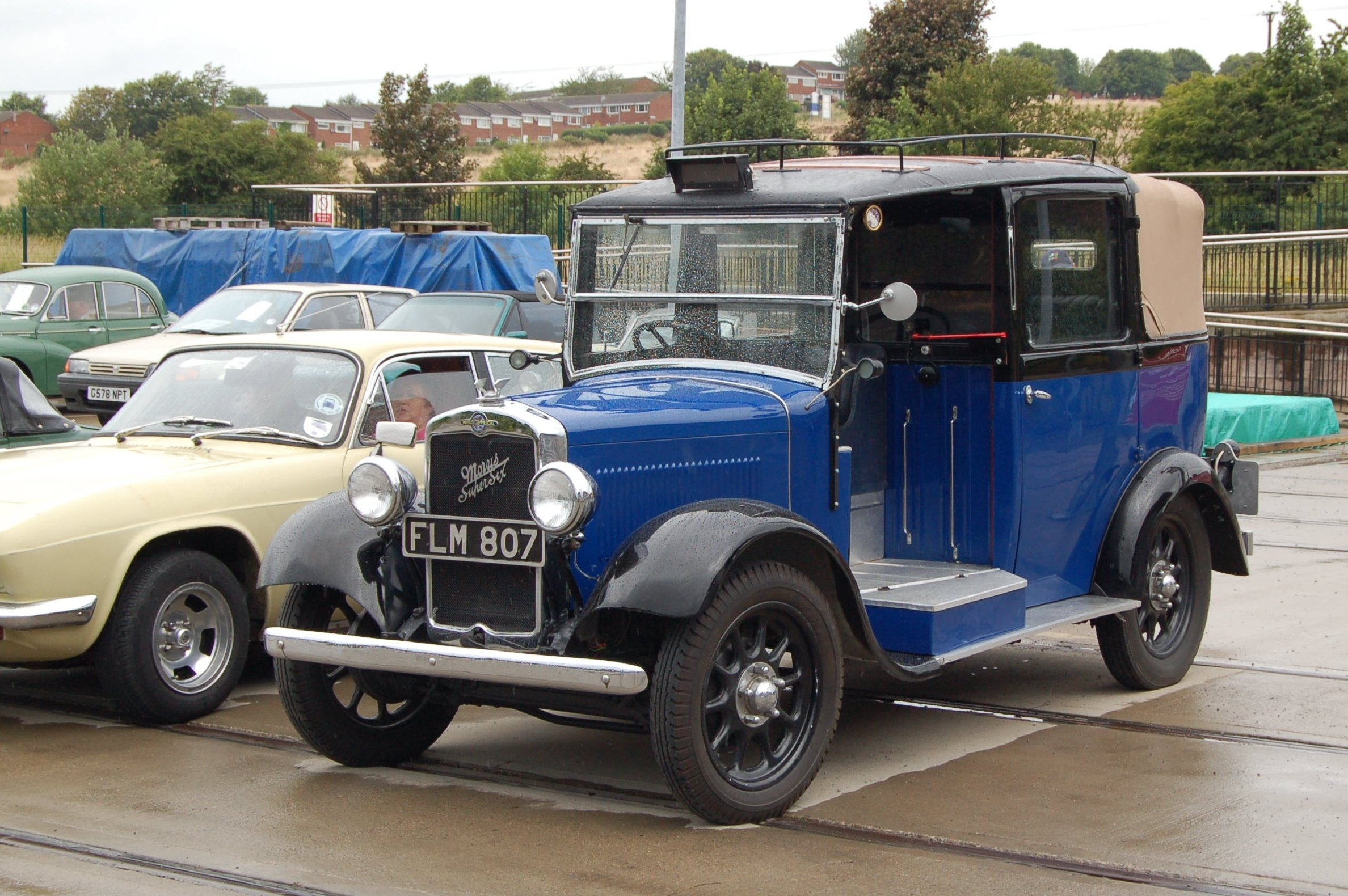
Morris-Commercial Super-Six London Taxicab 1.7-litre 1939

A new brand of London taxicab was announced on 9 February 1929. Built in accordance with New Scotland Yard regulations the new Morris-Commercial International taxicab was up to date and convenient in detail. Safety glass was fitted throughout, upholstery was real hide, a passenger need only press a button and speak in an ordinary voice and a microphone would communicate it to the driver. The cab's overall dimensions were 13 ft 6 in (411 cm) in length, 5 ft 8 in (173 cm) width, and 7 ft 2 in (218 cm) in height.

The 4-cylinder engine, single dry plate clutch and four-speed gearbox were a unit like that on the standard 30cwt Morris-Commercial vehicle. Four wheel brakes would have been better, reported The Times but the rear brakes supplied were efficient, the steel artillery wheels detachable. The average turning circle was 24 ft 9 in (7.5 m), wheelbase and track measured 9 ft (274 cm) and 4 ft 8 in (142 cm) respectively.

Carrying four passengers the taxicab had "plenty of speed" and four forward gears and was suitable for the country as well as London. The engine's four cylinders have a bore and stroke of 80 and 125 mm giving a displacement of 2,513 cc (153 cu in) and a tax rating of 15.87 hp. The engine had side valves with tappets easily reached for adjustment, the generator and magneto being driven in tandem. The cooling water circulated naturally. Such parts as the carburettor were easily accessible. The speed lever worked in a visible gate with a stop for reverse. The three-quarter floating back axle was driven by overhead worm gear from an enclosed propeller shaft. The springs were semi-elliptical and beneath the frame, those in front were flat and splayed while those at the back were underhung. Shock absorbers were provided. The chassis weighed 18 long cwt (2,016 lb; 914 kg).

These vehicles were succeeded by Nuffield Oxford Taxis.

== Vehicles ==
Military vehicles

- CS8 (1934–1941)
- CDSW (1935–1939)
- CS9 (1938)
- C8 (1939–1945)

Post war civilian production

- FV (1948–1955)
- J-type (1949–1961)
- FR (1955–1959)
- WE/WF (1955–1968 – kept in production as a BMC and then a Leyland until 1981)
- J2 (1956–1967)
- J4 (1960–1974)
- 250 JU (1967–1974)
