= Morris C8 =

Morris C8 Quad
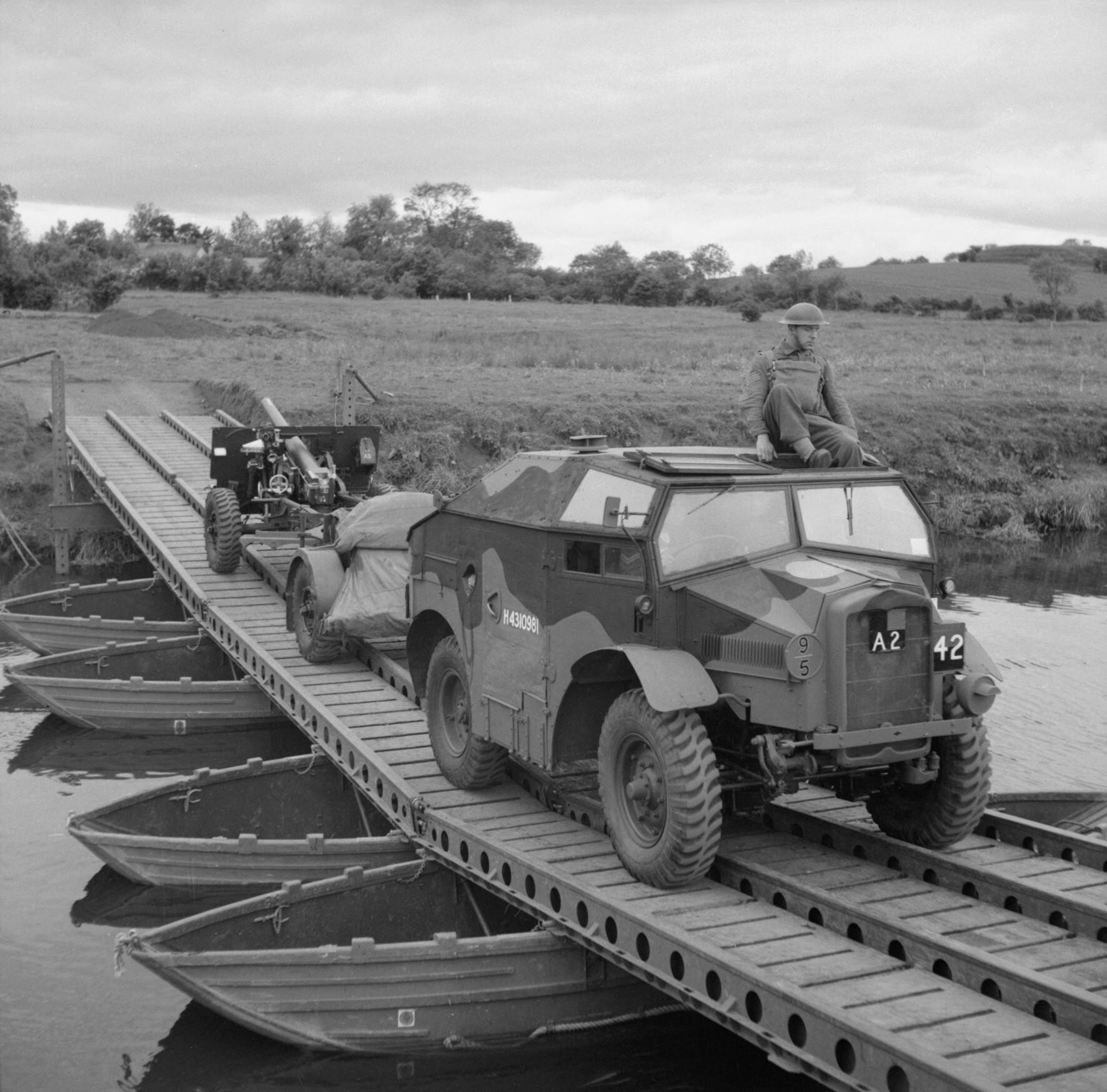
- Morris-Commercial Quad, limber, and 25-pounder field gun crossing a pontoon bridge at Slaght Bridge in Antrim, Northern Ireland, 26 June 1942
- Type: Artillery tractor
- Place of origin: United Kingdom

Production history
- Manufacturer: Morris and others
- No. built: 10,000

Specifications
- Mass: 3.3 long tons (3,400 kg)
- Length: 14 ft 8 3/4 in (4.489 m)
- Width: 7 ft 3 in (2.21 m)
- Height: 7 ft 5 in (2.26 m)
- Crew: 1 + 5 passengers
- Armour: none
- Engine: Morris EH, 4-cylinder 3.5 litre (214ci) petrol engine 70 bhp (52.2kW)
- Suspension: Wheel, 4 x 4
- Operational range: 160 miles (257 km)
- Maximum speed: 50 miles per hour (80 km/h)

The Morris Commercial C8 FAT (Field Artillery Tractor), commonly known as a (Beetle-back) Quad, is an artillery tractor used by the British and Commonwealth (including Canadian forces), during the Second World War. It was used to tow field artillery pieces, such as the 25-pounder gun-howitzer, and anti-tank guns, such as the 17-pounder.

Although its sloped sides suggest otherwise, the Quad was not armoured.

== Development ==
In 1937 the War Department identified a need for a new FAT to supplement, and then replace, the Light Dragon and Morris CDSWs then in service. A specification was issued for a four-wheeled, four-wheel drive vehicle, with winch, on a short chassis. Guy Motors produced their design quite quickly using existing components, and Morris followed with theirs. It was a totally new, but conventional, design evolved from the Morris CS8 15-cwt GS truck.

It included a new four-cylinder engine mounted on a subframe and not directly onto the chassis. Like the Guy, the body had a very characteristic slope sided, "beetle back" shape. It was all-metal and designed to facilitate chemical weapon decontamination, as well as to enable a gun traversing platform to be carried on the rear roof section. In addition to 6 men, it was capable of carrying 24 complete boxed rounds of 25-pounder ammunition and at least 8 boxed anti-tank shells, together with vehicle and gun detachment equipment.

The first Morris C8 Quad was delivered in October 1939 and it then stayed in production until 1945. There were two major changes to the mechanical side of the vehicle, and two independent ones to the body. The engine/chassis design was used on other Morris types, such as the C8 Morris 15 cwt truck. A long-wheelbase version was used to produce the C9B self-propelled Bofors Light Anti-Aircraft Tractor.

== History ==
As an FAT the Quad served with Field Artillery Regiments. Each regiment had 36 Quads; 24 towed a limber and gun, and 12 towed two limbers.

It was first issued in late 1939 and first used in action in France in 1940, towing 18-pounder, 18/25-pounder and 4.5-inch howitzers. Many were lost in the evacuation of the British Expeditionary Force (BEF) from France and as a result some of these were taken into service by the Wehrmacht.

From June 1940 it was also used to tow 75 mm guns provided by the USA; these were towed both with and without limbers. It was subsequently used wherever the Field Artillery Regiments went, from Iceland to Malaya, primarily as a tractor for the, then new, 25-pounder gun. It was also used by most of the Commonwealth and Allied units equipped with the 25-pounder.

Despite its popularity, it was felt that it was too small for all the equipment that had to be carried, as well as underpowered when fully loaded and towing. Moving a 9-ton load with a 70 bhp engine was not ideal, and its speed uphill was unspectacular. Considerable use had to be made of the winch on hills and in mud. Later in the war, when anti-tank regiments were equipped with 6-pounder and 17-pounder guns, Quads were issued as tractors. Normally these guns were towed without a limber but some 17-pounders were towed with limbers. This can only have been for the aid of the limber's brake, and a smoother tow, as the ammunition would not fit in a limber.

At the end of the War the Quad stayed in British service in the same roles. It saw extensive action in the Korean War and Malaya.

Many of the Commonwealth and Allied forces took their Quads to their home countries, and were provided with more ex-British ones to fully re-equip. The Royal Netherlands Army subsequently made extensive use of theirs in the East Indies.

The British rebuilt many of their Quads in the early 1950s, extending their useful life until 1959 when the last was sold off. They were replaced by three-ton tractors, derived from the Bedford RL and Fordson Thames E4.

== Variants ==
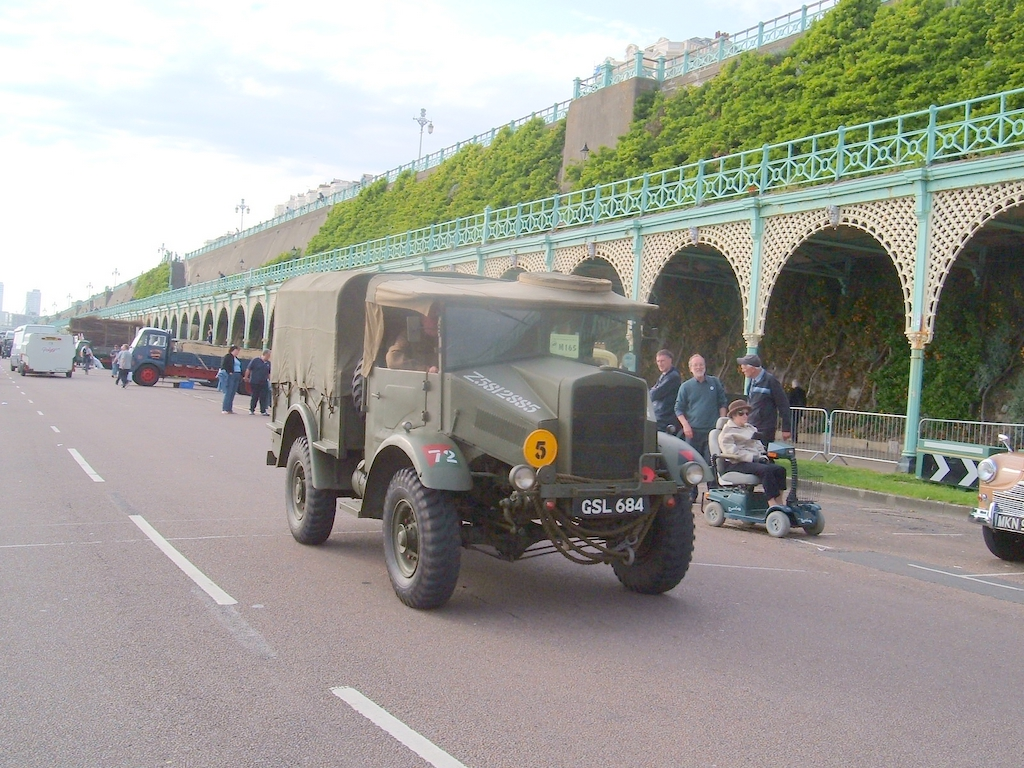
Morris C8 GS utility vehicle

A Morris C8 towing a 25-pounder

Mark I

Only 200 made in 1939 and very early 1940. Front axle had provision for a locking differential, and the axle itself was mounted above the springs. The vehicle had permanent four-wheel drive and 10.50 × 20 inch tyres. The accelerator pedal was mounted centrally rather than in the conventional position as the right-most pedal.

Mark II

Approximately 4000 made in 1940 and early 1941. It was almost identical to the Mk I, save for a change in front axle design, which removed the provision for the locking differential.

Mark III

Approximately 6000 made from 1941 to 1945. The front axle was mounted below the springs, and four-wheel drive could be switched on or off as required. Tyres were 10.50 × 16 inch size, and the accelerator was mounted conventionally as the right pedal.

Three types of body were used:

- All Mk Is and approximately the first 3,000 Mk IIs had a "beetle back" body. This had two doors, only two small windows on the right side and one on the left side, and an all-metal roof with two revolving vents.
- The later Mk IIs and approximately the first 4,000 Mk IIIs had a later type of "beetle back" with an additional small window on the left front side and windows in both doors. A canvas roof was mounted on a cruciform steel frame over the crew compartment, and there were two square vents in the roof behind the canvas section. The vehicle also had larger fuel tanks and filler cap surrounds.
- The last 2000 Mk IIIs had a "Number 5 body", which was a new design with a square shape and a complete canvas top with two circular hatches, and four doors with windows.

Once the 18-pounder and 18/25-pounder had left service there was no requirement to carry the gun's traversing platform on the roof. The brackets for this were duly removed, and usually substituted by a framework to provide an additional area for the storage of kit.

== See also ==
- CMP FAT, a similar vehicle by Chevrolet and Ford. Early models had very similar bodywork, but can be identified by a four-sided windscreen glass, compared to the five-sided Morris Quad screen, with the upper corner cut away.
