= Morris WE =

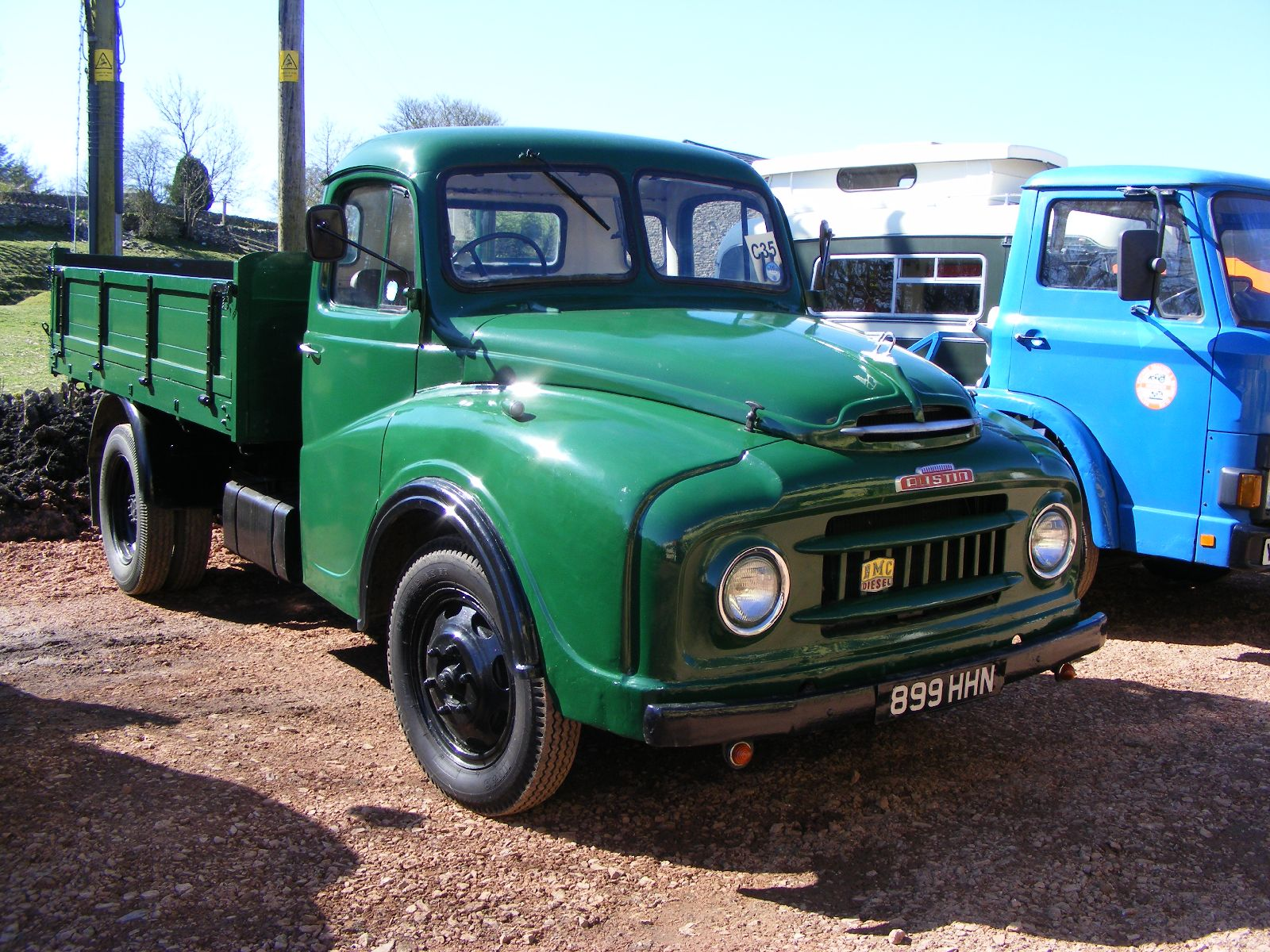

Overview
- Manufacturer: Morris (BMC)
- Production: 1955-1981

Body and chassis
- Body style: Truck

Chronology
- Predecessor: Austin Loadstar
- Successor: Leyland Landmaster; Leyland Landtrain

The Morris WE/Austin S203/S403/S503 was a bonneted truck produced by the British Motor Corporation from 1955. After a revision in 1964, it was marketed as the Morris WF/Austin S303/S403/S503 and from 1968 as the BMC WF. In the export markets, the Austin model was usually called the Morris, WE/WF. After BMC merged with Leyland Motors to form the British Leyland Motor Corporation, it was produced as the Leyland WF from 1970 to 1981 and replaced by the Leyland Landmaster.

== Description ==
Production of these trucks started in 1955. Whereas Morris had thus far focused on cab-over-engine trucks with a greater focus on fast and high-volume transport, the Austin Loadstar was a heavier truck more suitable as a construction vehicle, artic tractor or breakdown vehicle, and for export. Since the commercial vehicles of the Morris Motor Company and the Austin Motor Company were now developed centrally at BMC and were only marketed as Morris or Austin by different designations and emblems, the successor to the Austin Loadstar was to be marketed under both brands. The cab of the Morris WE or Austin S203/S403 was therefore derived from that of the Austin Loadstar, as was the chassis. However, the Loadstar remained in the program until the end of 1956 in the heaviest variant with a payload of 5 tons. Thus, in 1955, the Morris WE or the Austin S203/S403/S503 came onto the market with a payload of 2, 4, or 5 tons respectively. The drive was either a BMC 3995 cc 6-cylinder K-series petrol engine with 90 bhp (67 kW) or a BMC 3.1-litre diesel engine for the light variants. For the 5 ton variant, in addition to the 4-litre petrol engine, there was also a BMC 5103 cc 6-cylinder direct injection diesel engine with 100 bhp (75 kW). The 3.1 litre diesel engine was typically not offered on export markets; all engines were coupled with 4-speed manual gearboxes.

In mid-1964, the series was reworked and presented as the Morris/Austin WF. The 2-ton variant was omitted and now 3 tons payload was the smallest variant; the range consisted of the Austin S303/403/503. Payloads are 3, 4, and 5 long tons (3,050, 4,060, and 5,080 kg) respectively. Visually striking design differences were now the double headlights including a new radiator grille and a one-piece windscreen. In terms of technology, a BMC 3.8 litre direct injection diesel engine replaced the 3.1 litre and there was now a 5-speed instead of a 4-speed manual gearbox. In the domestic market, the model got the nickname "Woofer". After BMC decided in the 1960s to market its commercial vehicles under the brand name BMC, the series came to be offered as BMC WF. In 1966, a 5.7-liter BMC direct-injection diesel engine with 105 hp replaced the 5.1-liter. In the course of 1968, the Morris and Austin variants were merged into a single model called the BMC WF. In the same year, the merger of BMC and Leyland to form BLMC was agreed. Therefore, in 1970, the series was renamed the Leyland WF.

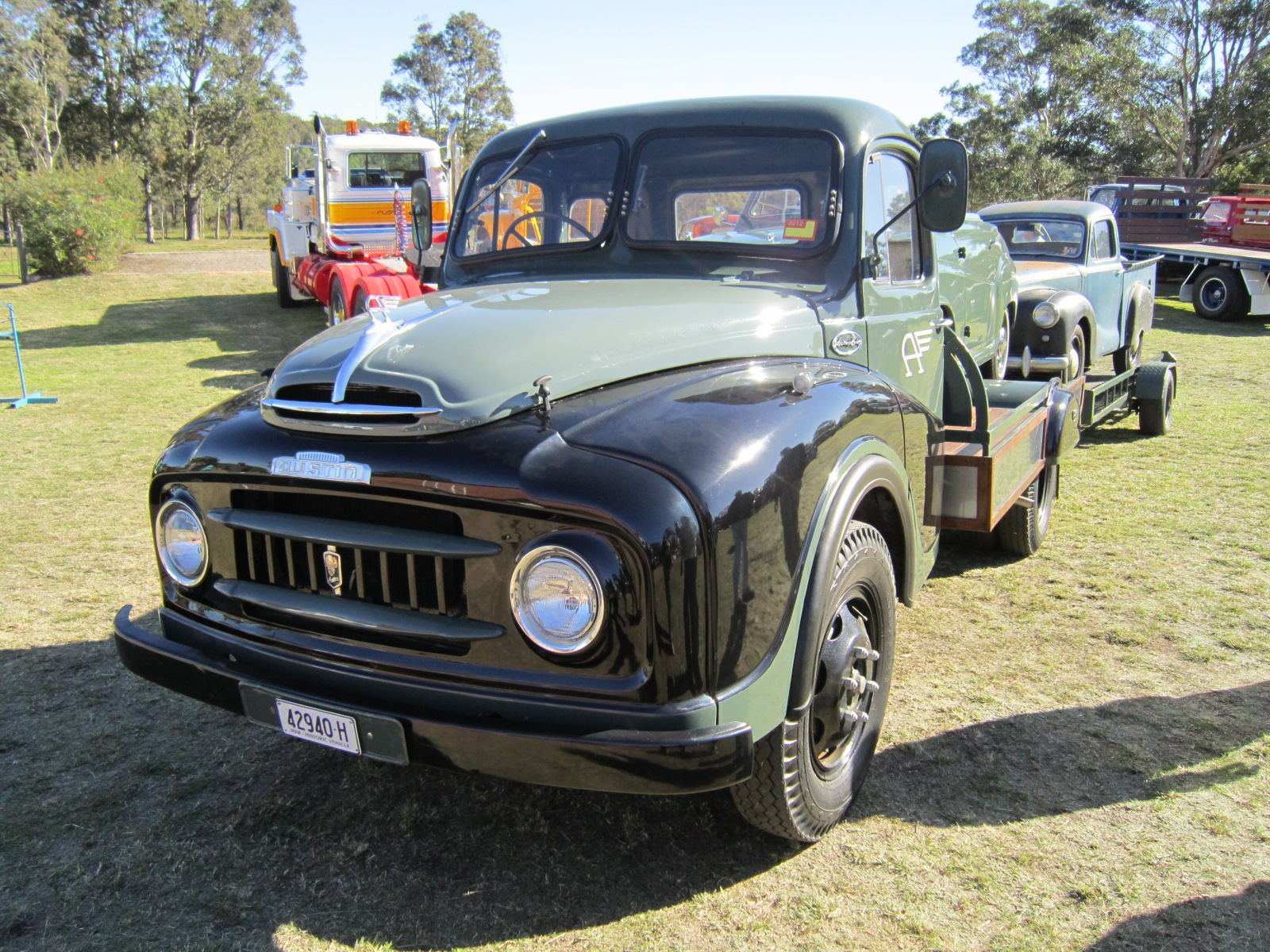
Austin rebadged version

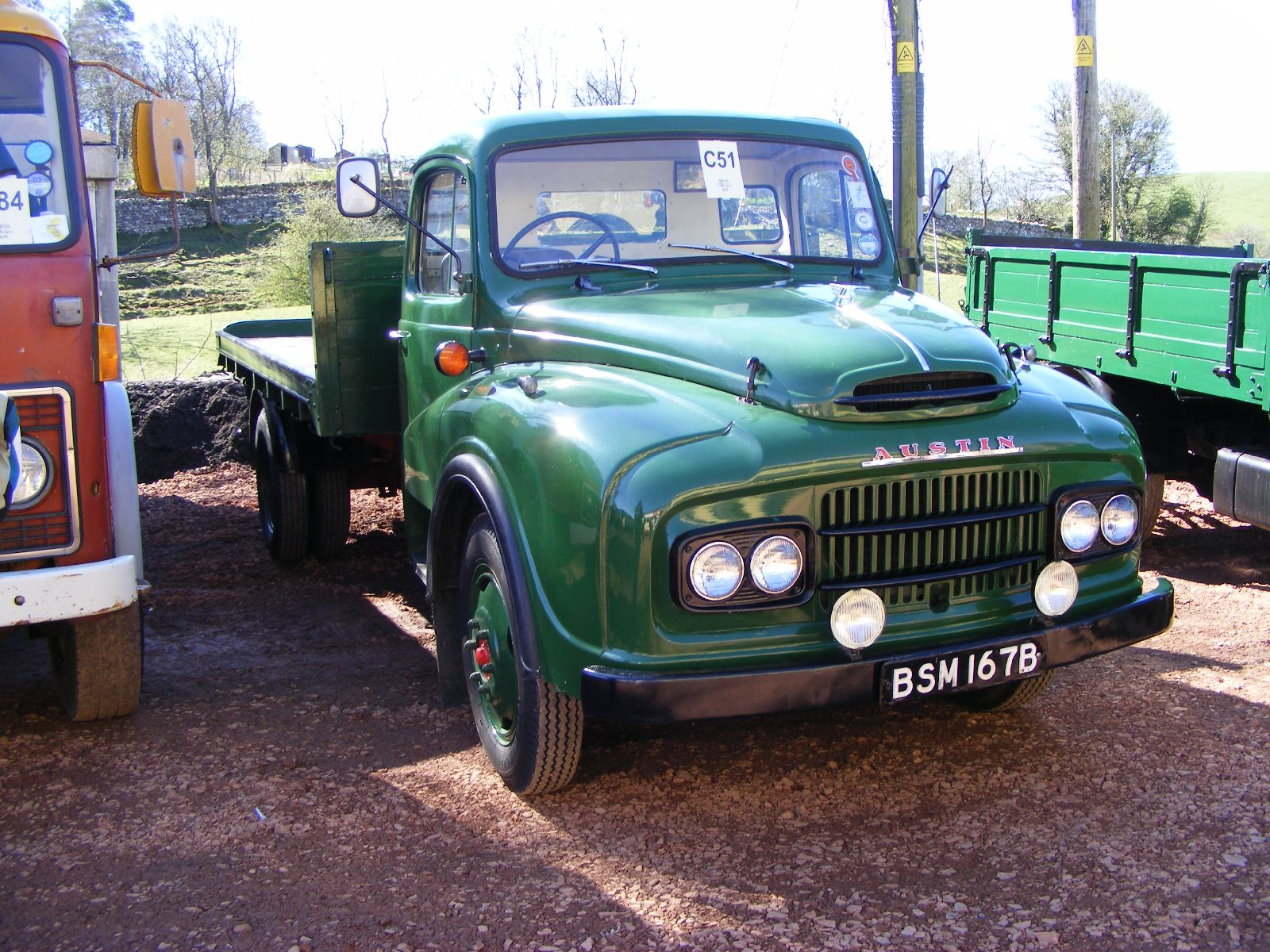
Austin WF, facelift model with twin headlights and single-piece windscreen (1964 WFK60)

Until 1975, the Leyland WF remained technically and visually the same as its predecessors. Due to the consistently high customer demand for the model, the WF was modernized again in 1975 and received a revised cabin and front. On the technical side, the Leyland 6.9-litre direct injection diesel engine with 115 bhp (86 kW) was introduced, as well as power steering. This brought it again a high demand and therefore a long production period until 1981, when it was replaced by the Leyland Landmaster and Leyland Landtrain, the latter mostly for export.
