= Morris CS8 =

Morris Commercial CS8
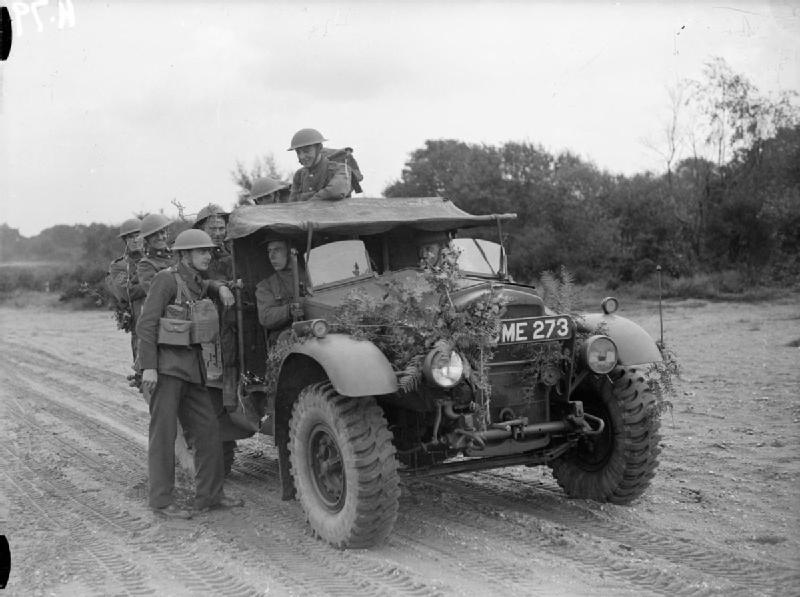
- GS truck and infantry section on a training exercise, Aldershot, November 1939
- Type: 15-cwt truck
- Place of origin: United Kingdom

Service history
- Used by: British Commonwealth; Germany (captured)
- Wars: Second World War

Production history
- Designer: Morris Commercial Cars
- Manufacturer: Morris Commercial Cars
- Produced: 1934–1941
- No. built: 21,319
- Variants: GS cargo, water, fire tender, wireless, fuel tanker, "office"

Specifications (GS cargo body)
- Mass: 1 long ton 18 cwt 1 qr (4,280 lb or 1.94 t)
- Length: 13 ft 10 in (4.22 m); 8 ft 2 in (2.49 m) wheelbase
- Width: 6 ft 4 in (1.93 m)
- Engine: 212.7 cu in (3,485 cm^{3}) 6-cylinder inline sidevalve petrol 60 bhp (45 kW) at 2,800 rpm
- Payload capacity: 15 cwt
- Drive: 4x2
- Transmission: 4F1R
- Suspension: Multi-leaf semi-elliptical springs
- Maximum speed: 40 mph (64 km/h)

The Morris Commercial CS8, also known as the "Morris 15 cwt", was a British light military truck of the Second World War.

Introduced in 1934, it was the most numerous vehicle of that size in the British Army at the start of the war but was replaced by other vehicles.

== Development ==
In 1933 the War Office issued a specification for a new type of purpose-built light trucks able to carry 15 long cwt (760 kg) loads, the specification stipulated a short wheelbase, good ground clearance, a semi-forward driver's position and the use of commercial components as much as possible but with the usual cabin eliminated to simplify production. It was planned to issue one 15-cwt truck to every platoon in a re-equipped mechanised British Army to carry personnel and equipment. Morris, Ford, Commer, Guy and Bedford all tendered vehicles to meet the requirement and in 1934 Morris was the first to produce a design, the CS8, which used elements of Morris' civilian C range. The S denoted a 6-cylinder engine and 8 referred to the nominal wheelbase in feet.

== Design and performance ==
The CS8 was a two-wheel drive two axle (4x2) light truck designed to carry 15 long cwt (1,700 lb; 760 kg) loads. The CS8 was powered by a 212.7 cu in (3,485 cm^{3}) 6-cylinder inline sidevalve petrol engine (Note: The engine had a tax horsepower of 25 hp and is also referred to as a 25 HP engine) that delivered 60 bhp (45 kW) at 2,800 rpm and driven through a four-speed transmission; its suspension was by live axles on multi-leaf semi-elliptical springs. The unladen weight of the vehicle in standard GS cargo form was 1 long ton 18 cwt 1 qr (4,280 lb or 1.94 t), it was 13 ft 10 in (4.22 m) long and 6 feet 4 inches (1.93 m) wide with a 8 feet 2 inches (2.49 m) long wheelbase. Early models featured open cabs with aero screens (small sections of glass to deflect the wind from the driver), folding canvas canopies and roll-up canvas doors, these were later replaced with full windscreens and metal-skinned half doors.

The CS8 was produced with a number of bodies, the majority were the 'General Service' cargo variant but there were also water bowser, fire tender, wireless truck, fuel tanker, compressor truck and command post ("Office") truck bodies. Additionally there was also a variant that carried the 2-pounder (40mm) anti-tank gun 'portee' on the rear body.

The CS8 had a maximum speed of 40 miles per hour (64 km/h). Some of the bodies were too long and heavy for the standard wheelbase which caused severe handling problems, particularly the wireless truck.

There was also a variant rated to carry 8 long cwt (410 kg) loads, called the PU8, which shared the same engine and drive line but had improved performance, a four-wheel drive (4x4) version of the PU8 was also produced called the PU8/4.

== Service history ==
In the years leading up to the Second World War the CS8 was the most numerous 15-cwt truck in British service, it was used by all branches of the British military and supplied to Commonwealth countries. A large number of CS8s were left in France after the Dunkirk evacuation and captured by the Germans. In Wehrmacht service they were sometimes fitted with new bodywork; the same happened in North Africa with the Regio Esercito capturing a few and mounting 65/17 cannons on them.

In 1941 Morris ceased production of the CS8, in favour of their C4 model which used a 4-cylinder engine but was otherwise similar to the CS8 except the wheelbase was increased to 9 feet (2.7 m) to rectify the handling issues of the CS8. Early in the war the Army decided it no longer needed 8-cwt trucks and production of the PU8 also ceased in 1941.

A stretched CS8 chassis was the basis of the Morris CS9 armoured car.

== Variants ==
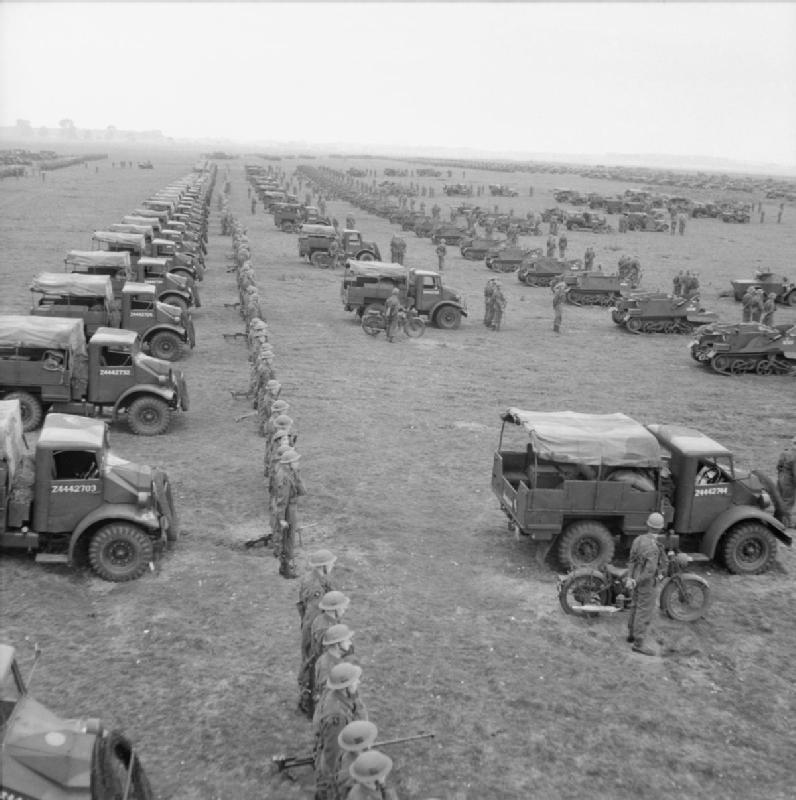
The Morris CS8s of a British Army motor battalion lined up behind Universal Carriers

- Mark I
- Mark II
- Mark III
