= Morris FV =

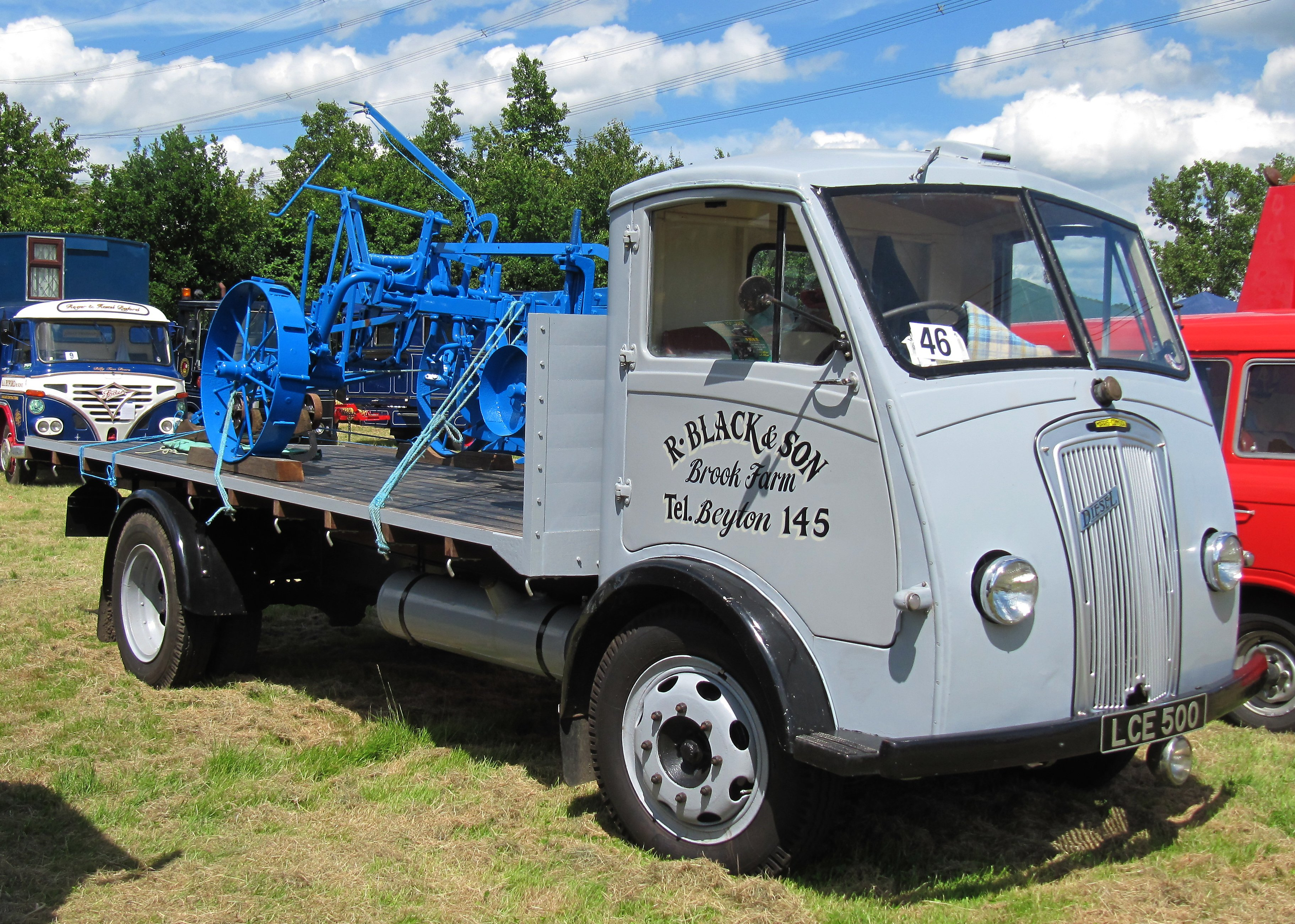
- 1952 Morris FV5

Overview
- Manufacturer: Morris Commercial; BMC (British Motor Corporation)
- Also called: Morris series I (1948-1954); Morris series II (1954-1955)
- Production: 1948 – 1955

Body and chassis
- Class: Truck, Van

Chronology
- Predecessor: Morris CVF
- Successor: Morris FE

The Morris FV was a "5-ton" truck produced by "Morris Commercial", part of Britain's Morris Motor Company, between 1948 and 1955.

The forward control vehicle replaced the Morris CVF. After Morris Motors merged with the Austin Motor Company in 1954, forming together the British Motor Corporation, the Morris FV was also available with an Austin badge. In 1955 the truck was again modified, emerging as the Morris/Austin FE.

The forward control cab configuration was an innovative feature when the FV was introduced in 1948. Its "5-ton" weight designation made it suitable for a wide range of applications. It featured a simple cabin with rear-hinged doors. In most respects the design was one reminiscent of pre-Second World War designs, although development of the truck did not begin until after the end of the war in 1945. Apart from the Pickup truck, Panel van and Tractor unit versions were offered. Customers could also buy the FV in Bare chassis form and obtain specialist bodywork from an appropriate supplier. For municipal fire departments, however, Morris offered their own factory-built Fire engine version.

The truck was powered by a 4.3-litre six cylinder diesel engine produced under license from Adolph Saurer AG. More commonly on the domestic market it was fitted with a four-cylinder Morris petrol engine delivering a claimed maximum 80 bhp (60 kW) of power. From 1953 a 6-cylinder Morris petrol/gasoline delivering a claimed maximum 100 bhp (75 kW)) of power was also offered.

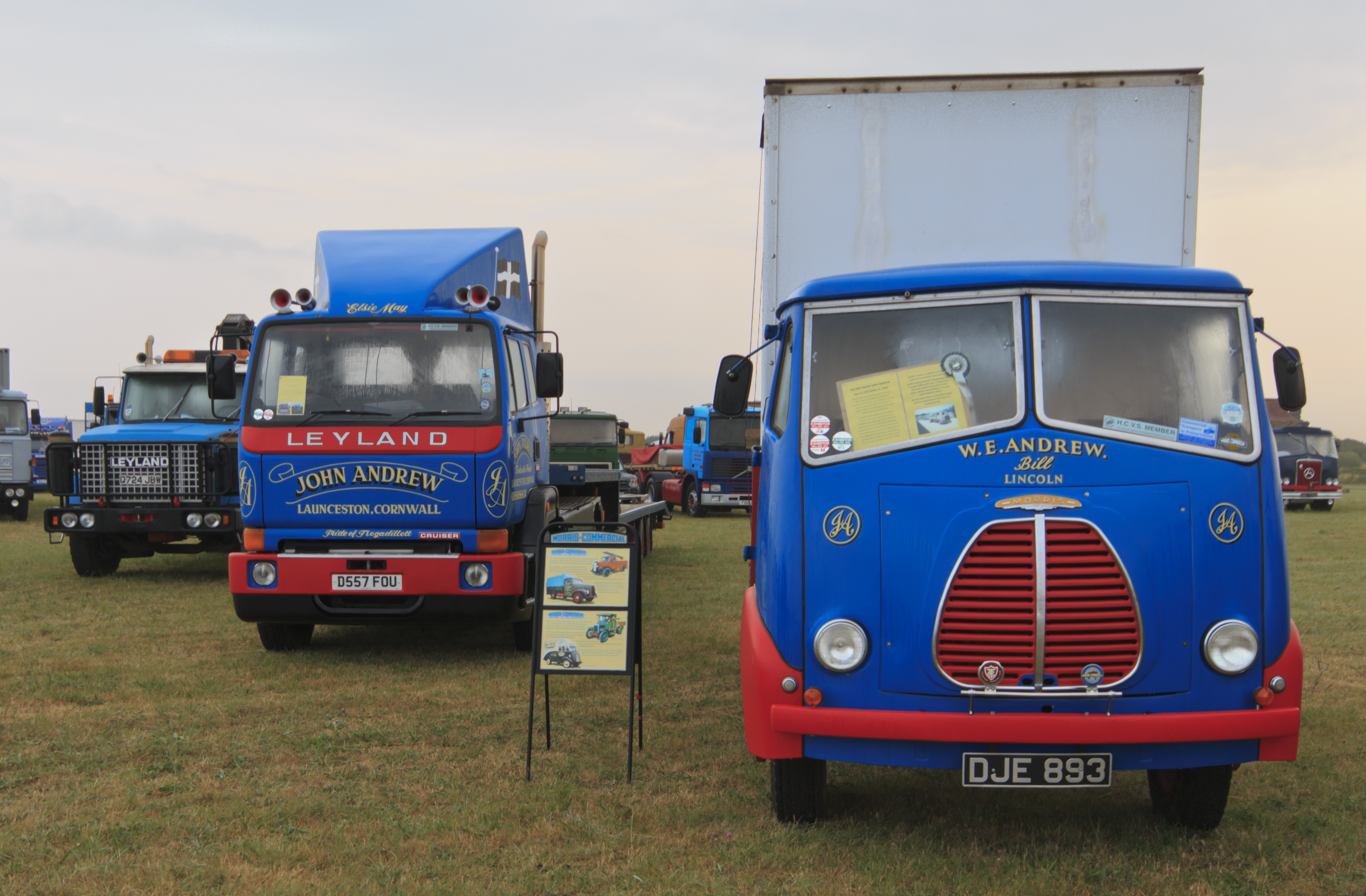
Morris FV Series II, with the revised grille (and front-hinged doors)

After the Austin-Morris merger in 1954 the cabin was modified, the most visible difference being the doors which were now hinged at the front end. The doors themselves were now narrower, however. Technically the Austin and Morris versions were identical, but the front grills were differently shaped: the Austin featured a horizontal grill while that on the Morris was in the shape of an upside down heart.

The modified vehicle was known as the 'Series II', and its predecessor was retroactively known as the 'Series I'. The Series II was itself replaced after only a year by the FE, which is also called the Series III.
