= Morris Commercial JE =

Overview
- Manufacturer: Morris Commercial
- Production: 2026 (to commence)

Body and chassis
- Class: Light Commercial Vehicle
- Body style: 4 Door Panel Van

Powertrain
- Battery: 60 kW·h lithium-ion
- Range: 250 miles (estimate)

The Morris Commercial JE is a fully electric light commercial vehicle developed by Morris Commercial, inspired by the iconic 1948 Morris J-Type van. First revealed as a prototype in 2019, the JE blends classic British styling with modern electric vehicle technology. Built on a lightweight carbon fibre and aluminium chassis, it features a rear-mounted electric motor and aims for a driving range of around 250 miles.

== History and description ==
=== Background ===
The British company Morris Commercial was established in 2015. The company's CEO is Dr. Qu Li who was criticised for her involvement in the collapse of the MG Rover Group. Her company briefly took over the LDV Group before selling it to China's SAIC Motor. She held on to the Morris trademark with the goal of "restoring Britain's vehicle industry."

=== Description ===
The Morris JE was formally unveiled on 13 November 2019, with initial plans for production to begin in 2021 at an estimated price of around £60,000.

Designed as a modern reinterpretation of the classic Morris Commercial J-Type van from the 1950s, the JE features a retro-inspired, two-tone exterior with curved lines and chrome detailing. The vehicle was presented in multiple body styles, including a 5-door panel van and a pickup variant.

Technically, the JE is built on a modular platform and features a carbon fibre monocoque structure, offering reduced weight and improved efficiency compared to traditional commercial vehicles.

Following development delays, Morris Commercial announced in late 2022 that production was expected to begin in 2024; however, this was later postponed to 2026.

== Specifications ==
The Morris JE is powered by a 60 kWh lithium-ion battery, offering an estimated range of up to 250 miles on a single charge. It supports both AC charging via Type 2 connectors and DC rapid charging, with the ability to reach 80% charge in just 20 minutes. A rear-mounted electric motor drives the JE’s rear wheels.

The van has a payload capacity of 1,000 kg and a gross vehicle weight of 2,500 kg. Its 6 m³ load space can accommodate two Euro pallets and standard 8’ x 4’ sheets, with a load bay up to 2.4 metres long and 1.3 metres wide between the wheel arches.

Morris Commercial is based in Worcestershire, where the JE was designed and developed. Production is scheduled to begin in 2026, with the manufacturing location to be announced later and the anticipation to produce 1,000 vehicles annually. Sustainability is a key focus of the JE’s design, with its fully recycled carbon fibre body.
