= Morris FE =

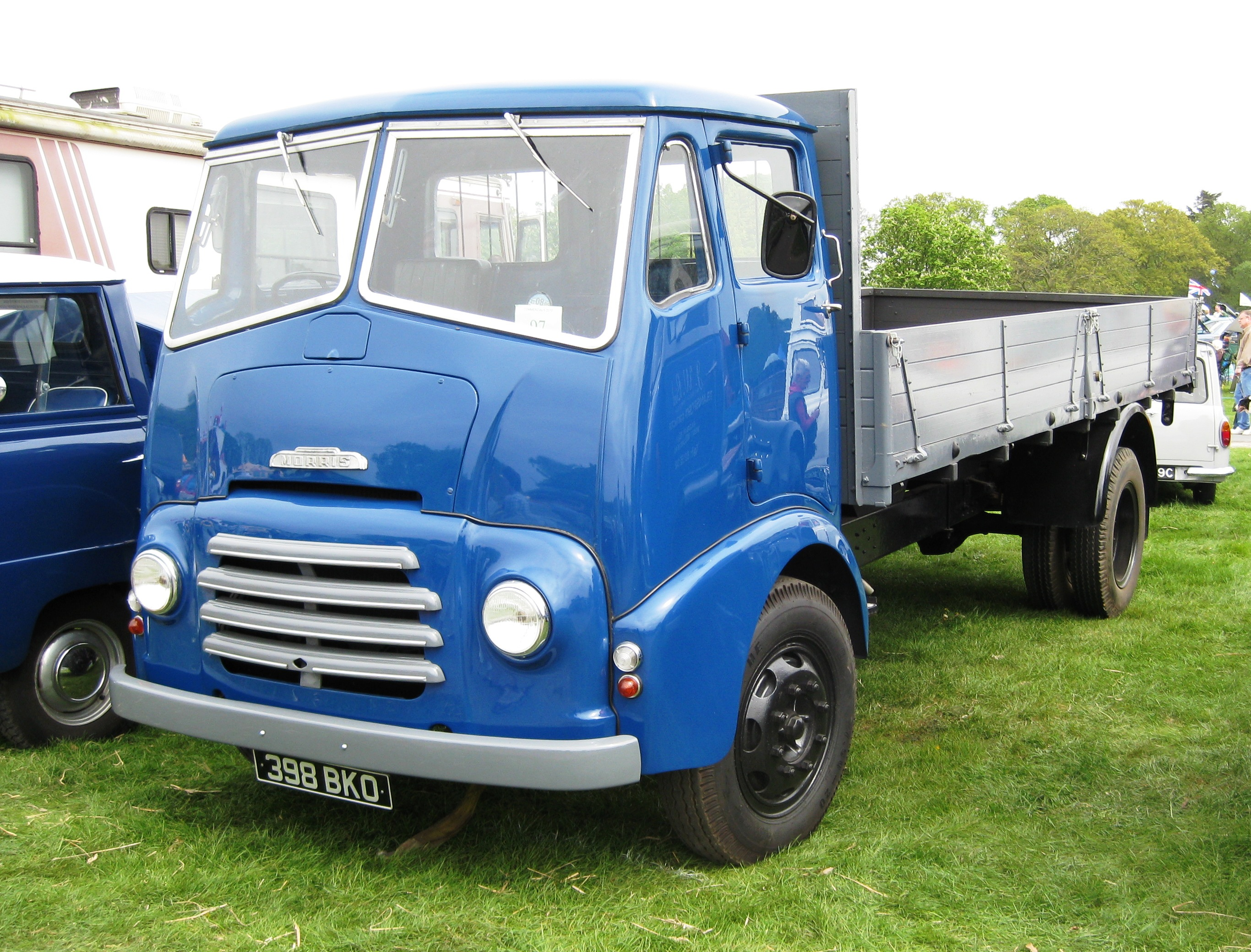
- Morris FE / Series III

Overview
- Manufacturer: BMC (British Motor Corporation)
- Production: 1955–1959

Body and chassis
- Class: Truck, Van

Powertrain
- Engine: 2.0-L – 3.7-L (petrol); 2.5-L – 3.0-L (diesel)

Chronology
- Predecessor: Morris FV; Austin Loadstar
- Successor: Morris FF; Morris FG

The Morris FE was a "5-ton"/"7-ton" truck produced by "Morris Commercial", part of the British Morris Motor Company, between 1955 and 1959. It closely resembled its predecessor, the Morris FV and this, apart from its forward control configuration, had been in many respects a pre-war design. The Morris FE featured a more modern front grille than the earlier vehicle, however.

As the merger between Morris and the Austin Motor Company worked through British Motor Corporation, in the merged company, the Morris replaced not merely the Morris FV but also the slightly larger Austin Loadstar. In addition to the "5-ton" version, a "7-ton" version was now offered.

As before Pickup truck, Panel van and Tractor unit versions were offered. Customers could also buy the FV in bare chassis form and obtain specialist bodywork from an appropriate supplier.

From 1956, the "Morris Commercial" brand ceased to be used. FEs not badged as Austins were now badged simply as Morrises.

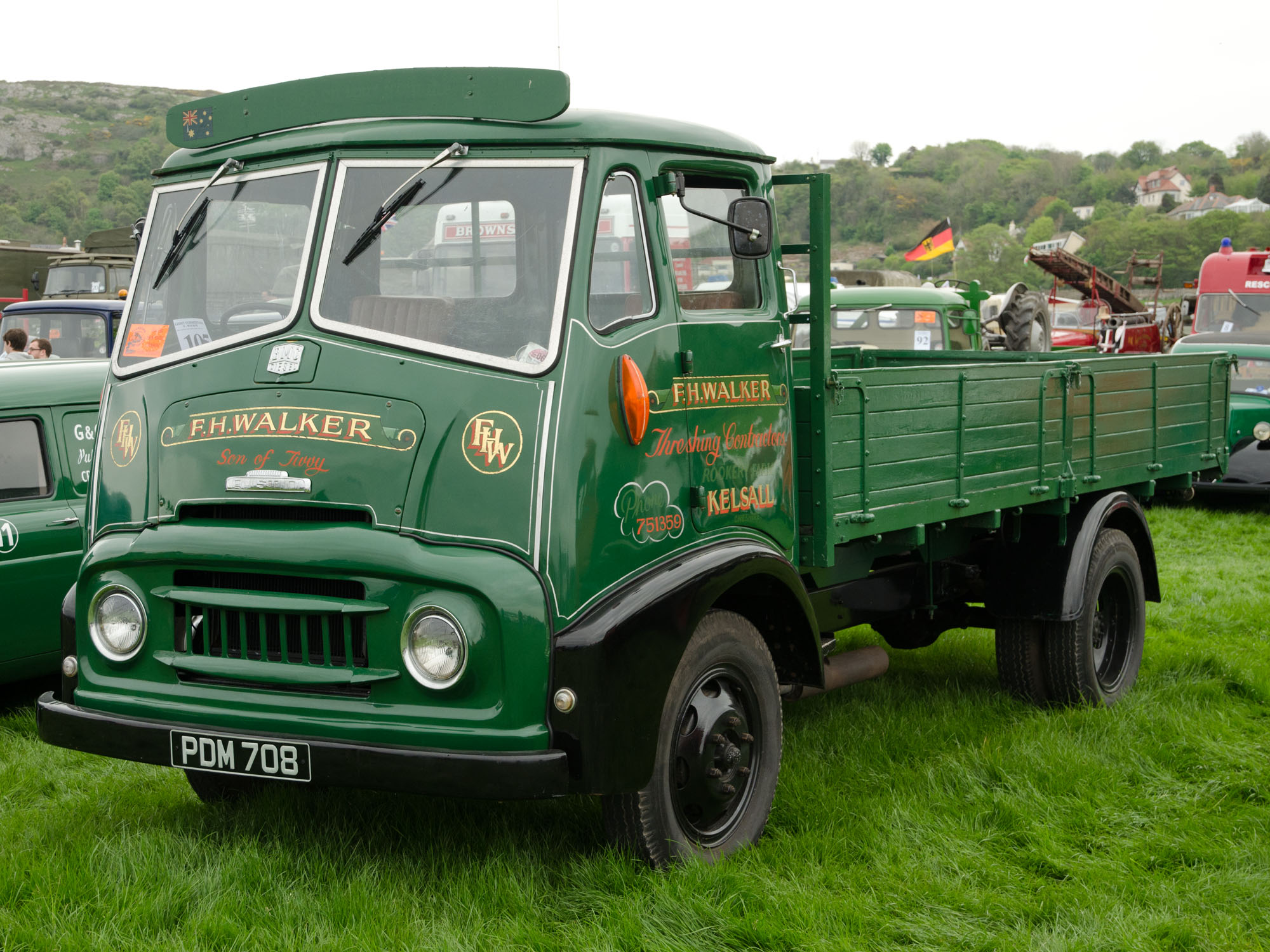
The Austin FE received a different grille treatment
