= Morris CDSW =

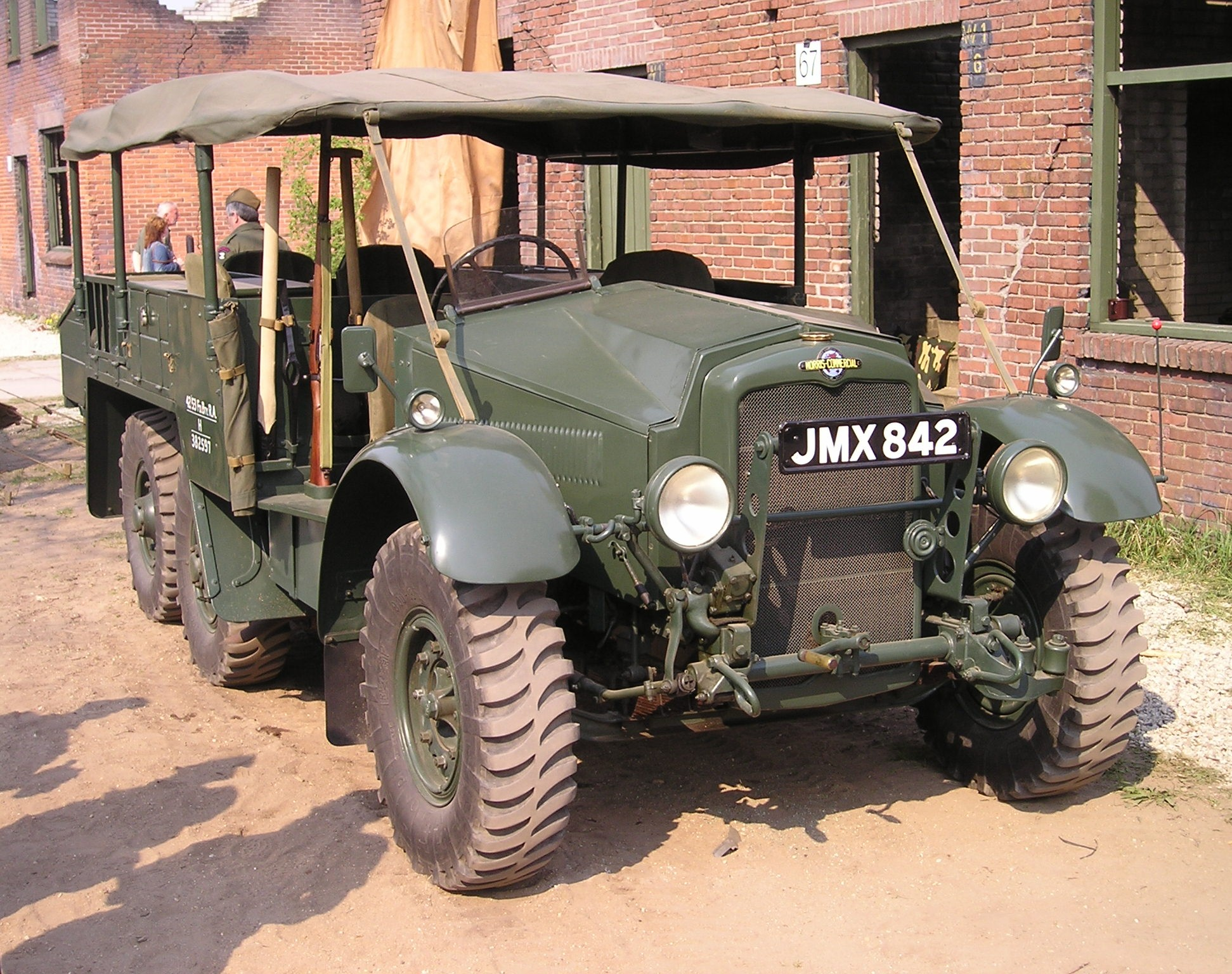
- Morris CDSW
- Type: Artillery tractor
- Place of origin: United Kingdom

Service history
- Used by: UK
- Wars: Second World War

Production history
- Designer: Morris Commercial Cars
- Manufacturer: Morris and others

Specifications
- Armour: none

The Morris CDSW 6x4 was a six-wheeled artillery tractor brought into service in the early to mid-1930s by the British Army to tow its field guns.

Typically it was used to pull the 18-pounder field gun and the 4.5-inch howitzer, and later the 25-pounder gun-howitzer which replaced those two weapons. It was also used, with a modified body, for hauling the 40mm Bofors in the Light Anti-Aircraft (LAA) regiments. A version equipped with a crane was used for "breakdown" work. It was for the large part replaced in its primary role towing the 25-pdrs by the Morris C8 "Quad".

CDSW indicated model "C", Double Axle rear "D", Six Cylinder Engine "S" and Winch "W".

== Gallery ==
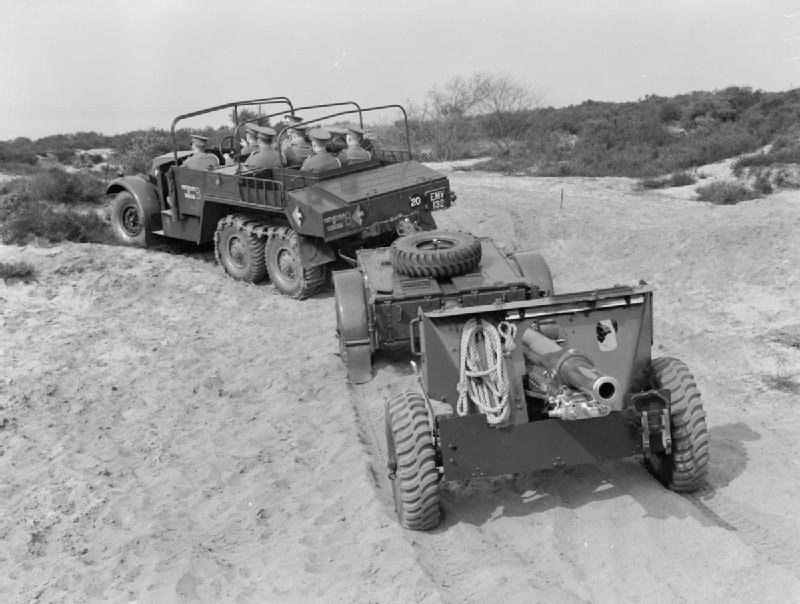
18pdr Towed By Morris Tractor 1938

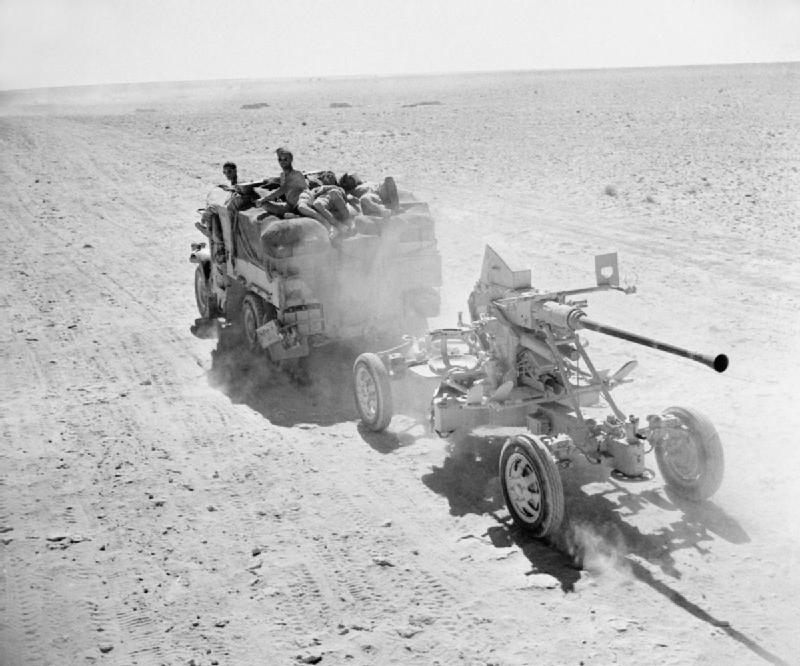
Battle of Egypt- the Retreat of the Eighth Army To New Positions. Modified CDSW towing a Bofors gun

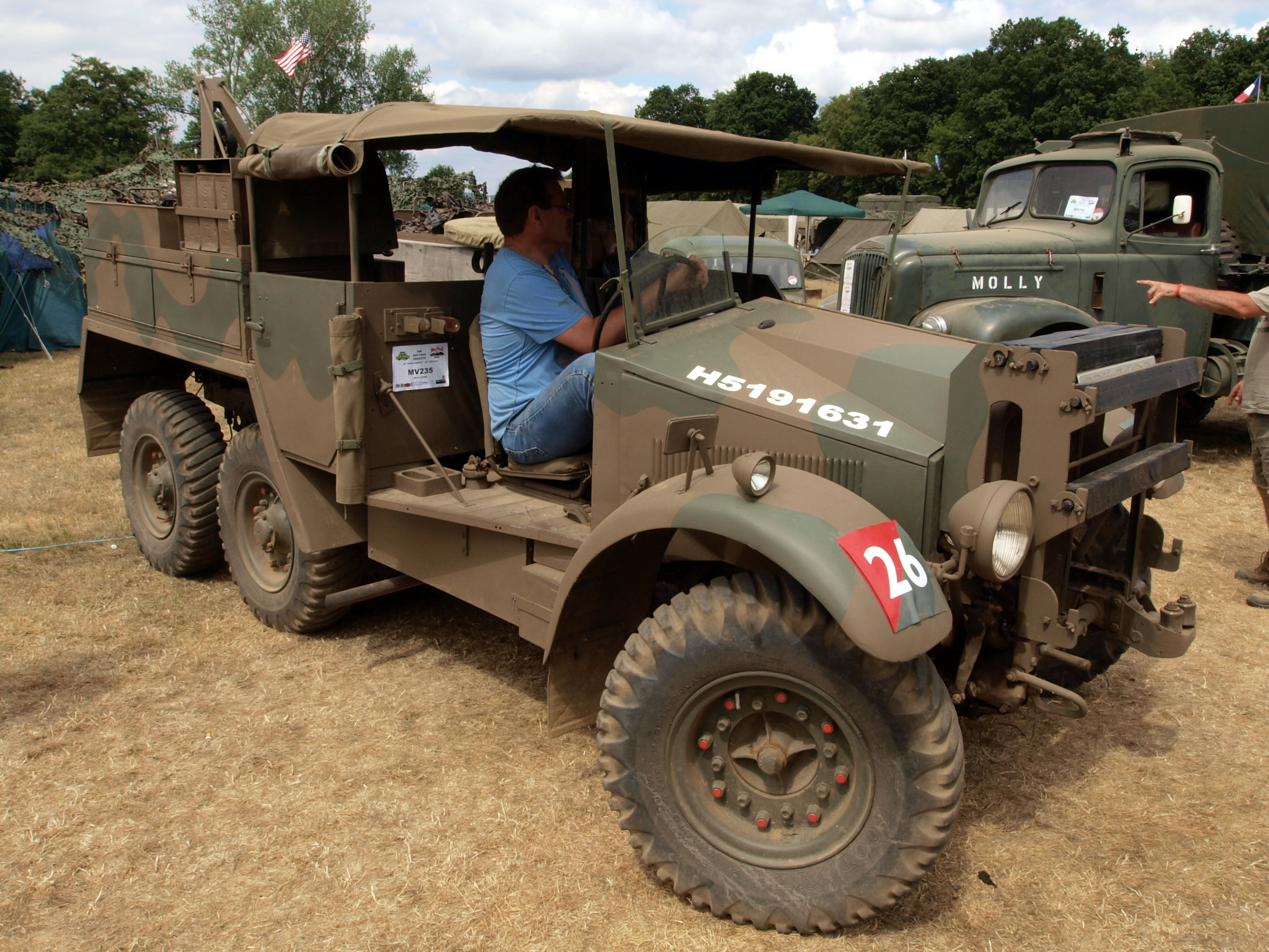
Morris CDSW Breakdown variant front

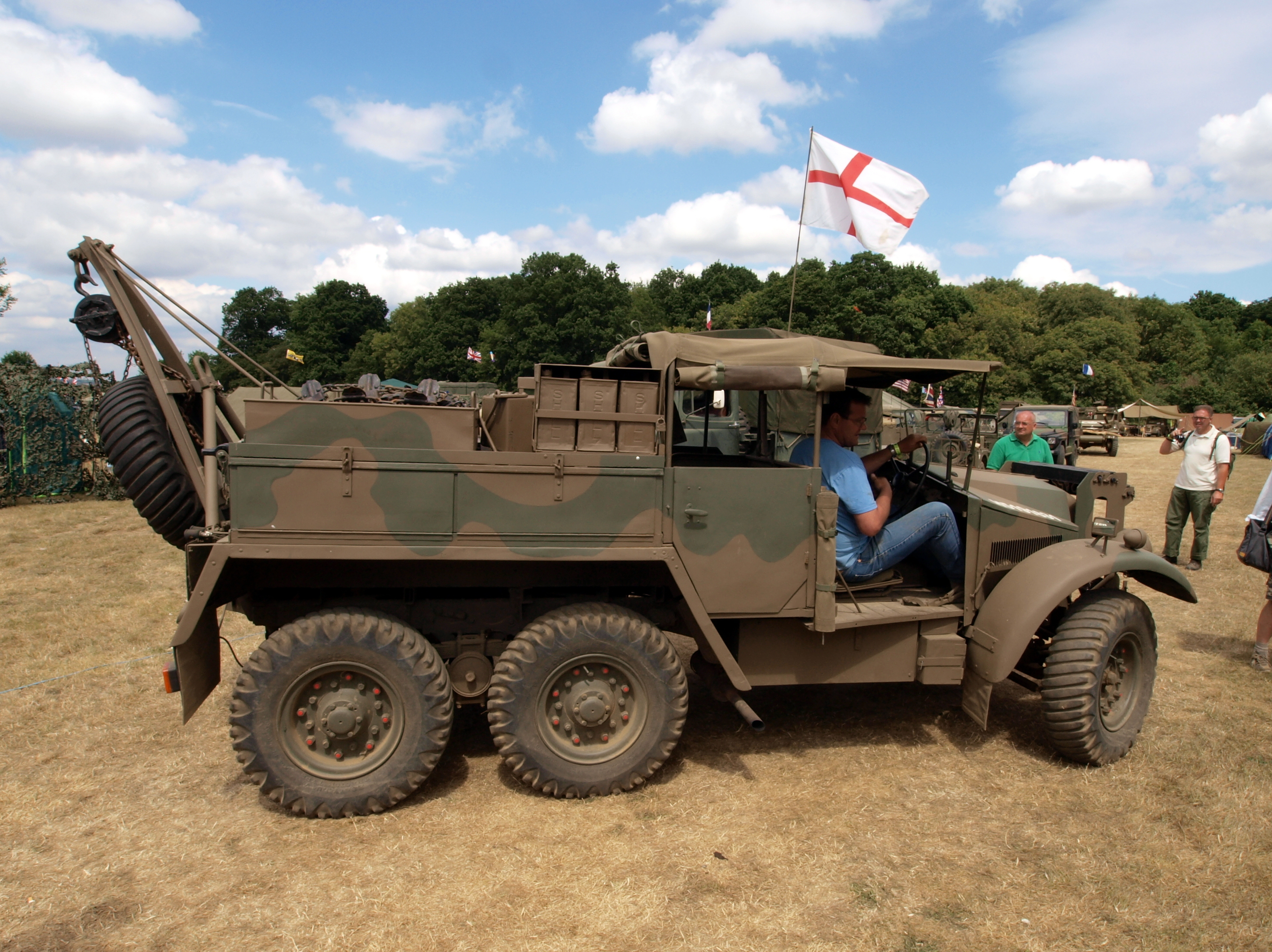
Morris CDSW Breakdown variant side

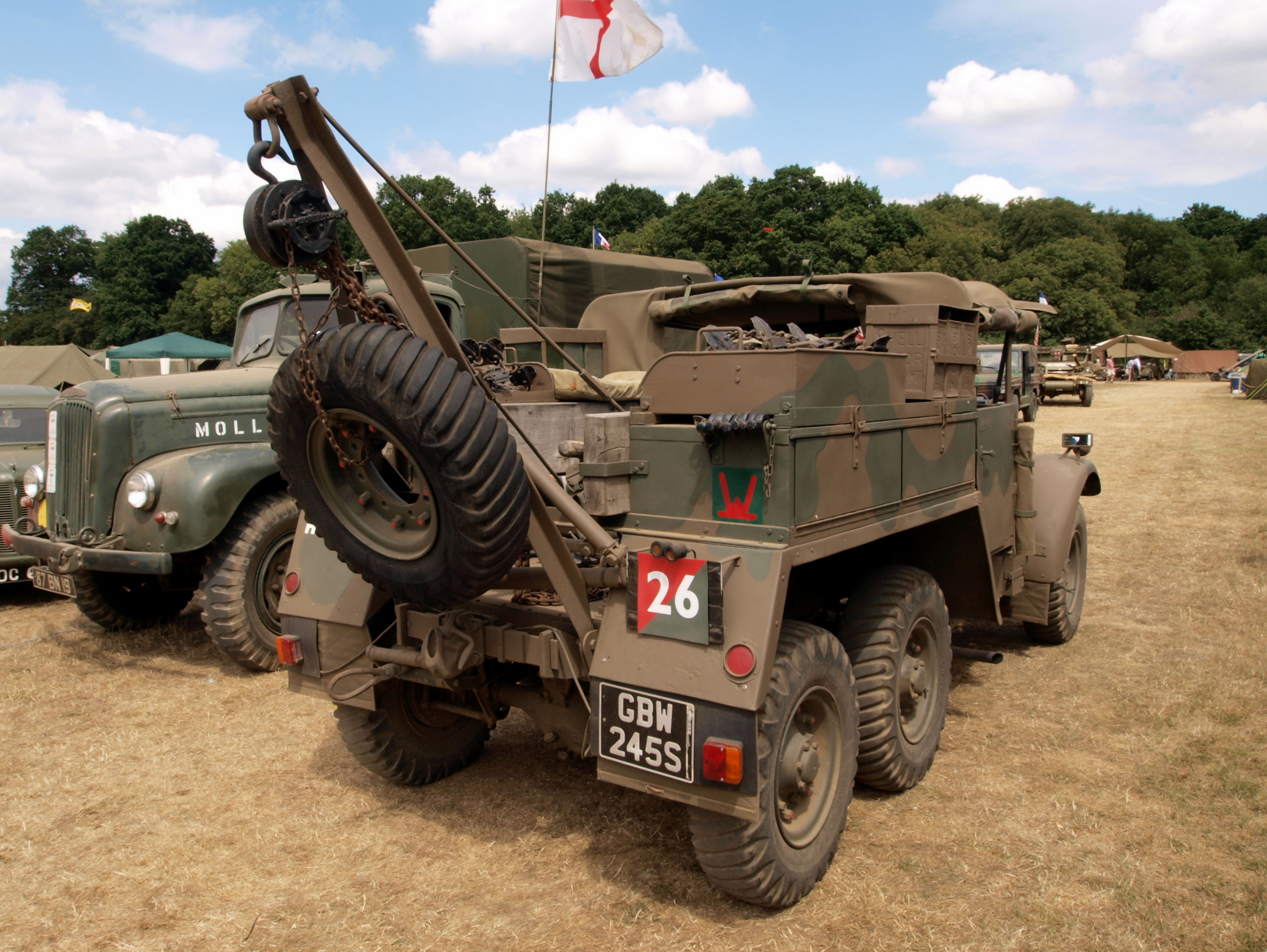
Morris CDSW Breakdown variant rear
