= Fitted For Wireless =

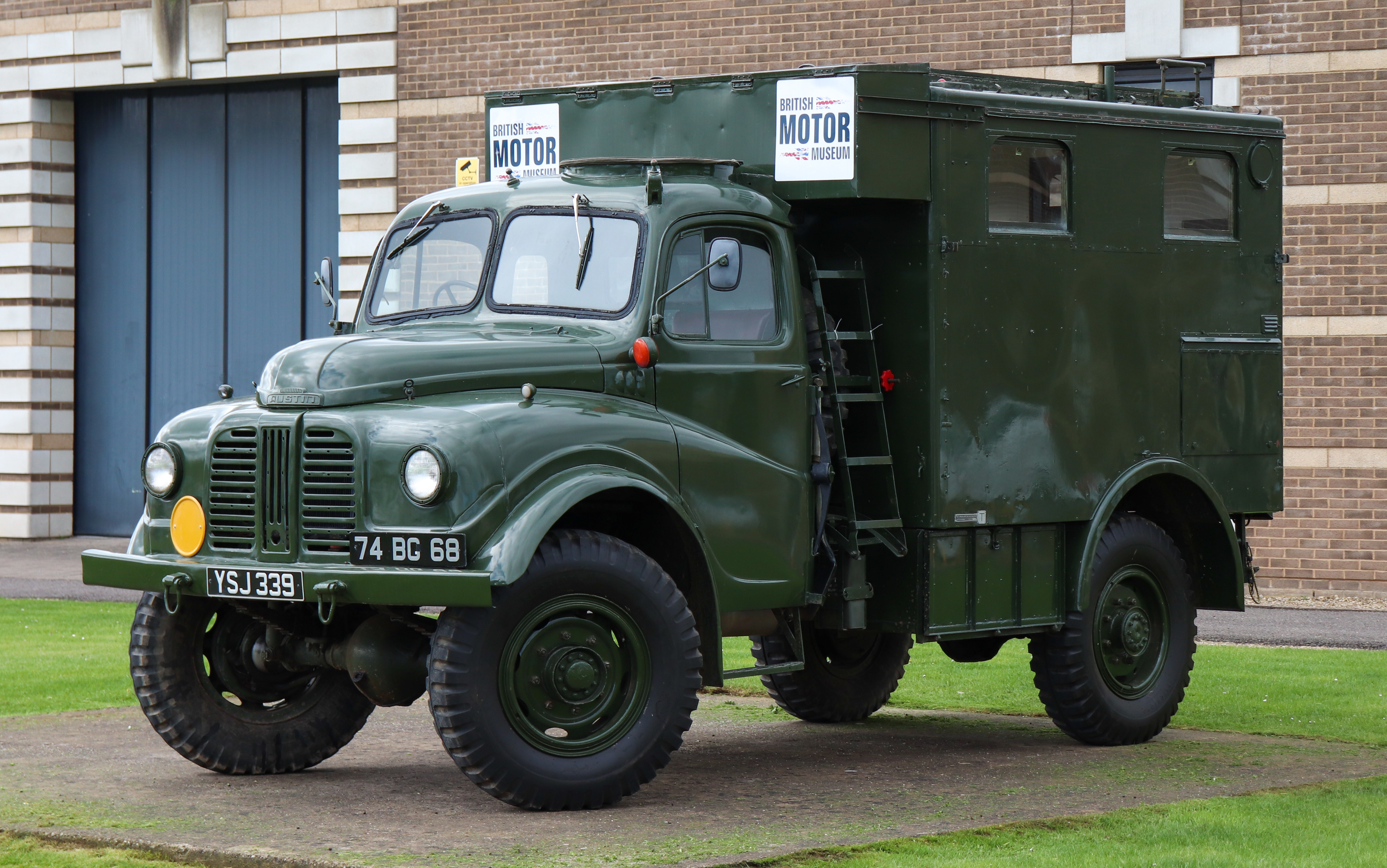
Austin K9 FFW, with 'house' body

Fitted For Wireless (FFW) and Fitted For Radio (FFR) were British Army designators for vehicles equipped to carry radio equipment. Although many of these vehicles were dedicated 'radio vans' and had complex and expensive radio sets installed, the intention was also that general purpose vehicles could be issued in 'FFW' state with the low-cost but time-consuming cabling and equipment mounts already prepared. The actual sets themselves could be installed later, if a new radio vehicle was required owing to damage or breakdown.

'Wireless' is a period term for 'radio', particularly in British use. The two 'Fitted For ...' terms had distinct, but not obvious, uses in this particular context and are often confused.

== Fitted For Wireless ==
=== World War II ===
FFW was the first term to be used and was applied to radio vehicles during World War II. Vehicle mounted wireless equipment early in the war was typically the Wireless Set No. 9 or No. 11, but after introduction in 1941, the No. 19 quickly became the standard set. This was a large, heavy, valve set, requiring a large power supply from heavy lead-acid batteries. A typical radio vehicle at this period would be a Bedford MW light truck of 8 cwt (410 kg) or 15 cwt (760 kg) capacity. In its FFW configuration, this might be equipped with two No. 19 sets, one low-power operating alone and one high-power set equipped with an additional Amplifier RF No. 2. These sets were arranged on a fitted desk across the body of the truck, with four or eight 6 V lead-acid batteries beneath.

Wartime sets generally required a 6 V or 12 V supply, and batteries were charged by a small petrol-engined charging set (generator) of 300 W, often the 'Chorehorse' type. When in use, this generator was carried out of the vehicle on a carrying frame and placed on the ground outside. The vehicle's own engine and lighting batteries were separate. Some vehicles were fitted with additional radio charging dynamos driven from a gearbox PTO. Later in the war, 24 V vehicles began to appear, firstly US-supplied armoured vehicles, further complicating the wireless supply considerations. In the case of the 19 set, a composite power supply that allowed 12 V, two-wire 24 V and 3-wire (i.e. 0–12–24 V) systems was introduced. This power supply also contained a vibrator type HT section so that the receiver section of the set could be run more economically.

The largest of these World War II FFW vehicles were the 3-ton command vehicles on lorry chassis and the 6×6 AEC armoured command vehicle. These were built for the use of staff officers and carried map tables, several telephones and other equipment, with space for a senior officer and his staff in command. As well as No. 19 sets, they also carried the high power and long range transmitter Wireless Sender BC-610. In this case they still carried the small 300 W charging set, but also a 3 kW generator set, usually an American-made Onan. Most radio use would be made when established as a temporary headquarters with long-wire aerials rigged, in which case the generator set would be used dismounted. When on the move, or during the course of a battle, the low-power radios could still be used from batteries, with vertical whip aerials. The small charging set could be used to recharge these, with less effort and also less noise to give away a position.

=== Post-World War II ===
After World War II, FFW configurations were produced for the Jeep, Austin Champ and Land Rover. In these smaller vehicles, it was necessary to construct racking to hold the sets and often to remove the rear seats. Owing to the small capacity of the Jeep and early Land Rover charging systems, the 300 W charging set was still required, although there was little space for it and was sometimes even mounted between the front seats. The Austin Champ was provided with a high-output generator and shielded ignition system from the outset, and was also built in a dedicated FFW version from 1954. Single-set installations were produced for the Jeep during World War II The introduction of the post-war and smaller C42 and C45 sets allowed a dual-set installation, even in these small 5 cwt (1/4 long ton; 250 kg) vehicles. Whip aerials for the VHF set(s) were installed on the front wings of these vehicles, together with their base-mounted Aerial Tuning Units to obtain maximum separation from any HF antenna. This practice became a distinctive feature of British Army vehicles in later years.

Larger vehicles, such as the Austin K9 1-ton, the Humber FV1600 series 1-ton, or the 3-ton Bedford RL, had a less rigid installation. While these vehicles were available in FFW versions that were merely cargo vehicles fitted with additional generator capacity and outlets, dedicated communications vehicles had wood-framed 'house bodies' built on the chassis with a fitted desk inside and a standard Wireless Control Harness type B The radio sets installed varied, according to the tactical role of the vehicle. Power was standardised at 24 volts (nominal) and in vehicles not equipped with power take-off facilities, still depended upon separate batteries and the use of a charging set.

== Fitted For Radio ==
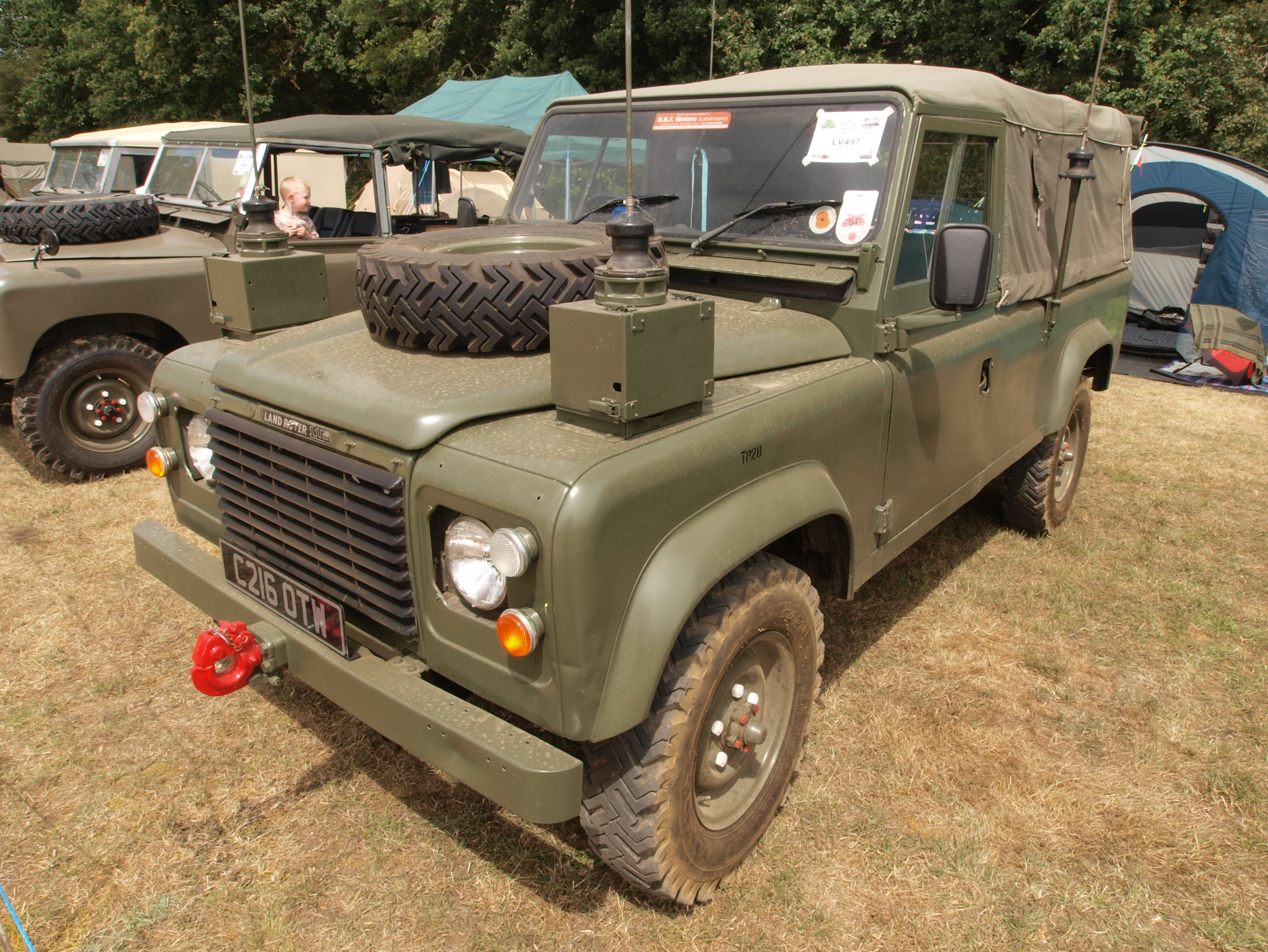
Land Rover 110 FFR, with wing mounted TRFA (Tuner Radio Frequency Antenna) boxes

In the 1950s, two factors changed the provision of vehicle radio within the British Army. The first of these was a change of philosophy for battlefield radio communication as a result of wartime experiences and the political and military situation in Europe after 1945 which was addressed by the "New Range" of sealed, primarily VHF/FM Combat Net Radio introduced from 1954. This later become known as the Larkspur series of equipment after the 1962 project to equip the whole army with the new radio system. (Note: The Larkspur program was launched in 1962, although some of the sets, the C42 and C45, had already entered service.) This modern design of equipment, although still using valves, was lightweight and where possible avoided the motor-generator / rotary converter power supplies of earlier generation equipment such as the No. 19 set, in order to reduce the sets' power requirements.

The second factor was the development of the 'CT' (a contraction of 'combat') range of soft-skin combat vehicles, as a purpose-designed and more rugged alternative to the General Service vehicles based on modified commercial (CL) vehicles. These CT vehicles, particularly the FV1801 Austin Champ 1/4 ton and the FV1600 series Humber 1 ton, were powered by the new Rolls-Royce B range engines. Drawing on wartime experience, these engines were designed with built-in radio suppression, especially their ignition system, and they were also available with purpose-designed high-output generators, and were based on 24 V systems in accordance with agreements reached with the US and Canadian armies in 1948. These 25 A generators were initially thought sufficiently powerful to supply and charge the radio batteries directly, no longer needing the separate charging set. The generator had an internal two-speed automatic gearbox, which increased the charging rate when the engine was running at near-idling speed. However it soon became clear that this was insufficient to meet the demands of the new sets and higher output systems based on alternators were later introduced.

Fitted For Radio versions of the Champ and Humber were soon developed. This new term also represented a re-definition of the old FFW. FFR vehicles were those intended for immediate service with radios, and had the sets installed already. FFW now meant vehicles that were only partially equipped for radio use: the standard engine was suppressed against radio interference, (Note: This was already done for B range engines anyway.) the radio mounting racks were either installed, or their mounting brackets were attached to the vehicle body, and aerial mounts had been installed. The intention was that FFW was a low-cost addition at manufacture, but any FFW vehicle could now be rapidly upgraded to full FFR status in the field. Some FFR vehicles were supplied for specialised use (for example to the Royal Artillery) where non-standard radio equipment was to be fitted immediately, by unit workshops.

Two radio versions of the soft-skin Humber were developed: the FV1602 with the same canvas-roofed general service truck body of the FV1601, with the addition of radio equipment. Secondly the FV1604 as a dedicated radio van, with a coachbuilt house body.

When the supply of new Champs ceased in 1956, the production of FFR Land Rovers commenced, initially as 12Volt Rover Mk III and Mk V FFRs, but from 1958 (the start of the Series II Land Rover production – military designation Rover Mk VI) FFR switched to 24 V. The standard dynamo generator was initially replaced by a 40 A alternator with external rectifier stack mounted in front of the radiator for cooling giving the vehicle a distinctive appearance seen from the front of the vehicle, behind the radiator grille. Later vehicles were fitted with the AC90 alternator system manufactured by CAV which became a standardised system in light and medium British vehicles. FFR Land Rovers also had the front wing-mounted boxes for the 'Tuner Radio Frequency Antenna (TRFA)' antenna tuning units, with whip aerials mounted above them.

== See also ==
- List of British Army radio sets
