= Austin Loadstar =

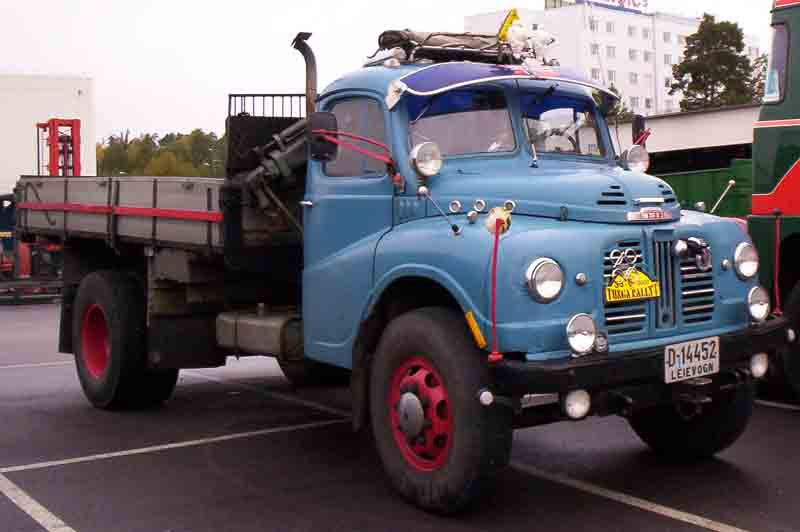

Overview
- Manufacturer: Austin (BMC)
- Production: 1949–1955

Body and chassis
- Class: Medium lorry
- Body style: 2-door conventional cab

Powertrain
- Engine: 3995 cc K-series OHV I6
- Transmission: 4-speed manual

Dimensions
- Wheelbase: 2,900 mm (110 in); 4,000 mm (160 in)

Chronology
- Predecessor: Austin K2
- Successor: Austin S201/401/501

The Austin Loadstar was a lorry produced by the British Austin Motor Company from 1949. It was Austin's first new lorry design after World War II and their last stand-alone design before Austin's merger with Morris Motors to form the British Motor Corporation (BMC). The Loadstar was a revised version of the Austin K2 and was offered in the UK, Australia, New Zealand and Scandinavia, partly again as the Austin K2 for the 2-tonne and as the Austin K4 for the 5-tonne payload variant. The Loadstar was powered by a six-cylinder petrol K-series engine from Austin, which generated an output of 125 bhp (93 kW) from a displacement of 3995 cc. Two different wheelbases with 2.9 and 4.0 meters were available. In the early 1950s, economic difficulties forced Austin and the Morris Motor Company to merge to form the British Motor Corporation. As a result, the Loadstar was replaced in 1956 by the Austin S201/401/501, which was also offered as the Morris WF by means of badge engineering.

== K-Series engine ==
The Loadstar was powered by Austin's 3995cc K-series six-cylinder petrol engine. This robust engine was known for its durability and was also utilised in other Austin commercial vehicles and passenger cars of the era, including the A125 Sheerline and A135 Princess. The engine in the Loadstar produced 125 bhp (93 kW), providing ample power for the lorry's intended payload capacity. While no diesel engine option was initially offered, a Perkins P6 diesel engine became available as an option later in the Loadstar's production run. This provided an alternative for operators seeking improved fuel economy.

== K9 variant ==
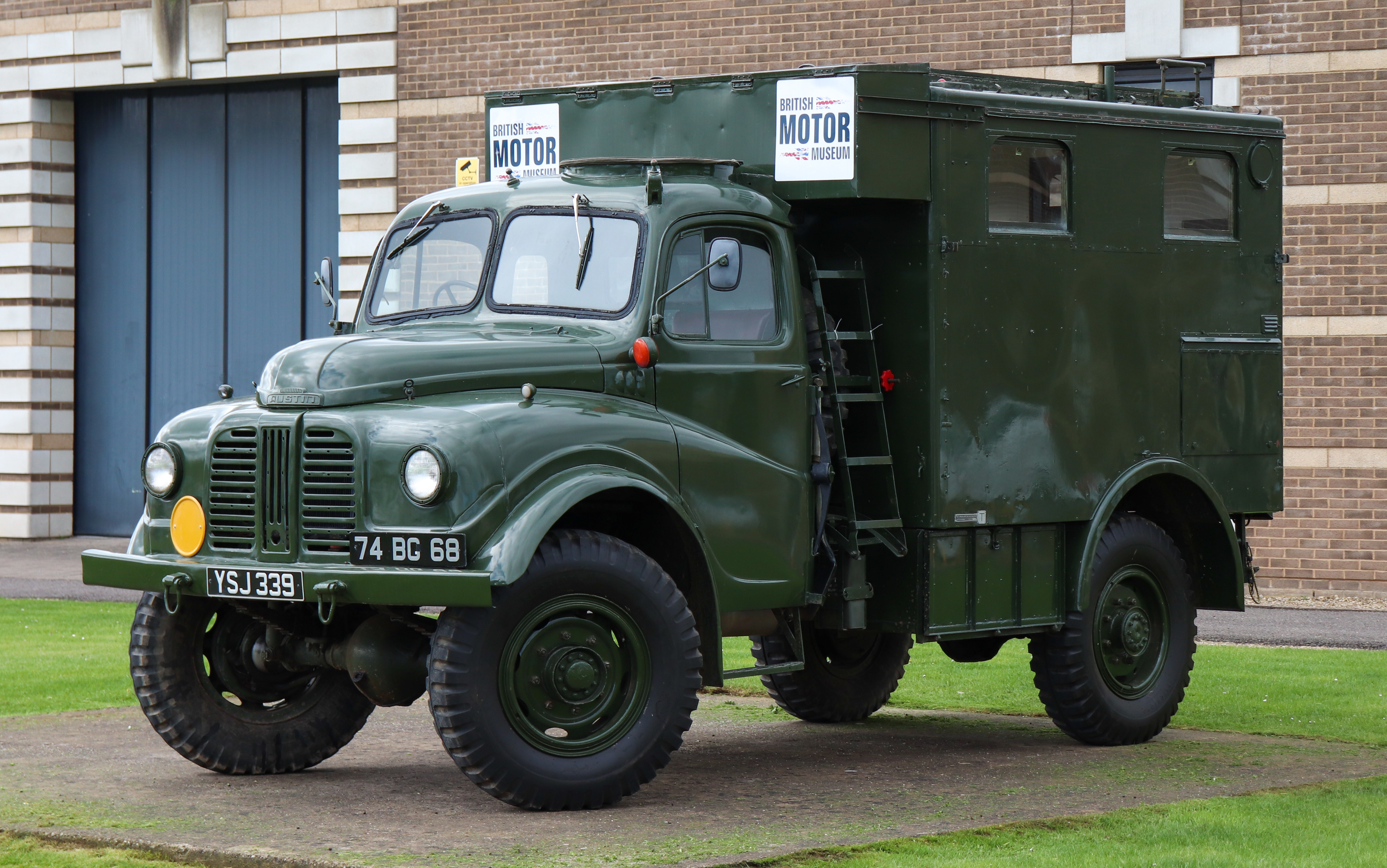
K9 Fitted For Wireless radio lorry Displayed at the BMM, Gaydon

A military 4x4 variant known as the K9 was also produced and was used for several purposes including an ambulance, water carrier, recovery vehicle and radio lorry. The military version often had a round hatch in the cab roof for defensive and observation purposes.
