= Morris CS9 =

British armoured car used in the Second World War

Morris CS9/LAC
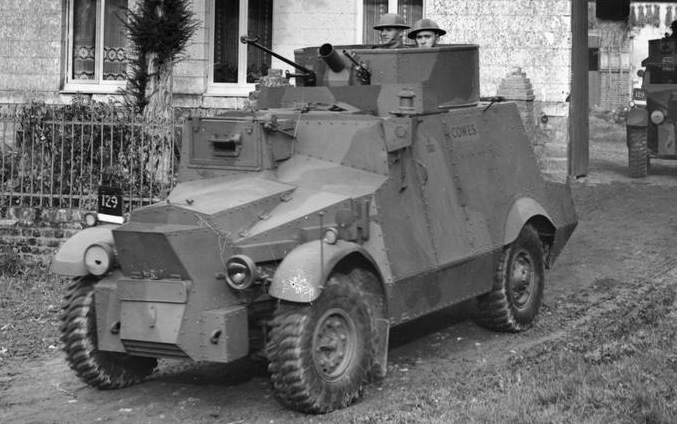
- Morris CS9 of 12th Royal Lancers at Villiers St Simon, 29 September 1939.

Production history
- Manufacturer: Morris

Specifications
- Mass: 4.5 t
- Length: 15 ft 6 in (4.77 m)
- Width: 6 ft 9 in (2.05 m)
- Height: 7 ft (2.13 m)
- Crew: 4 (commander, gunner, driver, radio operator)
- Armour: 7 mm
- Main armament: 0.55 inch Boys anti-tank rifle
- Secondary armament: 0.303 (7.7 mm) Bren light machine gun
- Engine: Morris 6-cylinder petrol 96 hp (72 kW)
- Power/weight: 21.3 hp/tonne (16 kW/tonne)
- Suspension: Wheeled: 4 x 2
- Operational range: 240 miles (385 km)
- Maximum speed: 45 mph (73 km/h)

The Morris CS9/Light Armoured Car was a British armoured car used by the British Army in the Second World War.

== History ==
The vehicle was based on a Morris Commercial C9 4x2 15 long cwt (760 kg) truck chassis. On this chassis, a riveted hull was mounted with an open-topped two-man armored basket (as it had no roof it wasn't strictly a turret). The armament consisted of either a Boys anti-tank rifle and a Bren light machine gun or a 12.7mm Vickers HMG. It also carried a smoke grenade discharger and a No. 19 radio set.

The prototype was tested in 1936. A further 99 cars were ordered; these were delivered in 1938. Thirty-eight of these cars were used by the 12th Royal Lancers in the Battle of France, where all of them were destroyed or abandoned. The Lancers found that the vehicle had a large turning radius and poor off-road capability, and that while the armament was sufficient for scouting purposes it did not perform well when the car had to be used in rearguard actions such as at Dunkirk. Another 30 served with the 11th Hussars in the North African Campaign, where they took part in attacking the forts at Sidi Omar and Capuzzo, as well as in the fighting in Cyrenaica. It was found that, when fitted with desert tyres, the vehicle had good performance on soft sand. However, its 7mm armour and armament were insufficient and the vehicles were removed from front line service by the end (one source says halfway through) the campaign. Some were captured and used by both German and Italian forces.

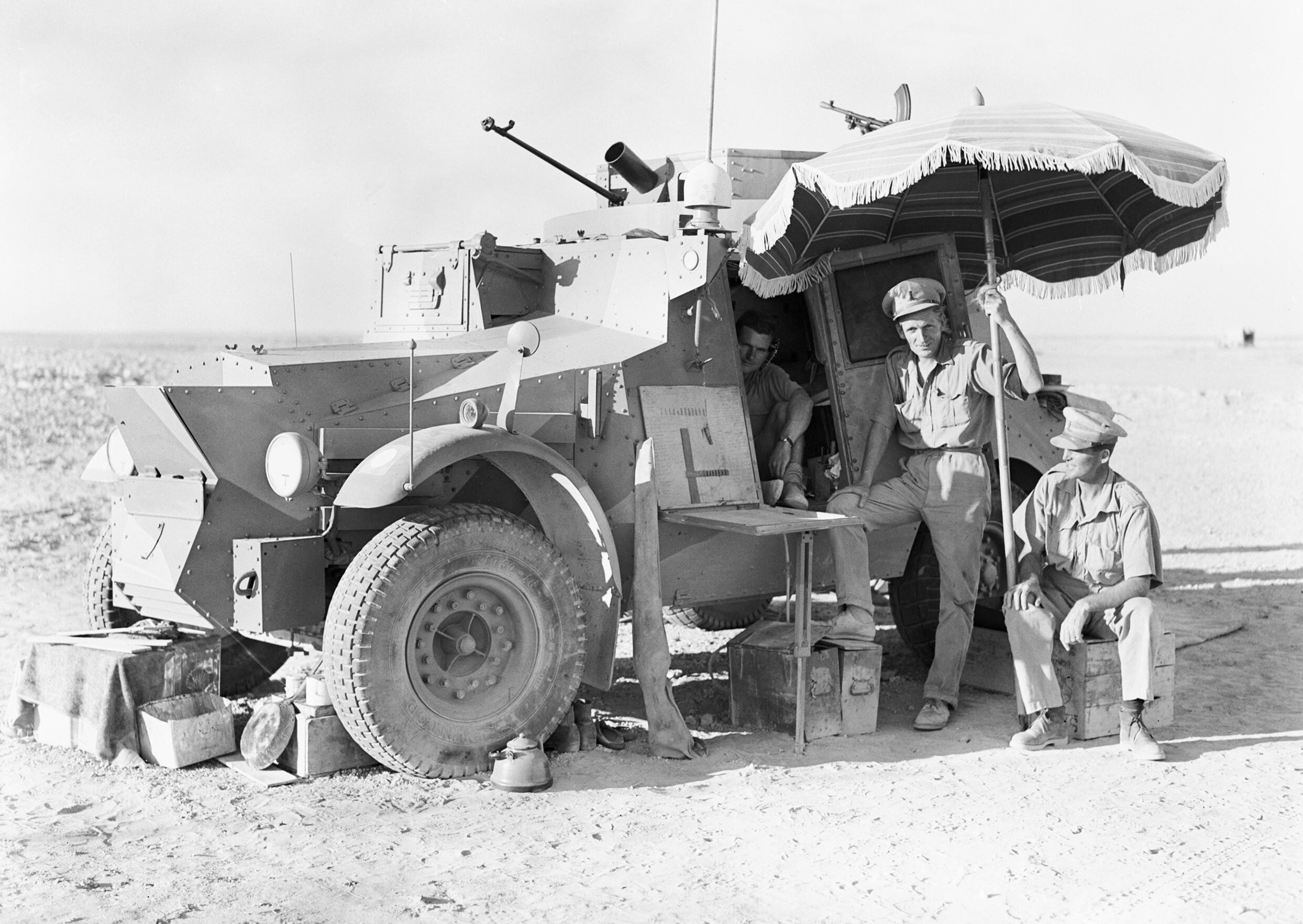
Officers of the 11th Hussars in a Morris CS9 armoured car use a parasol to give shade while out patrolling on the Libyan frontier, 26 July 1940.
