= Deaths in August 1985 =

The following is a list of notable deaths in August 1985.

Entries for each day are listed alphabetically by surname. A typical entry lists information in the following sequence:

- Name, age, country of citizenship at birth, subsequent country of citizenship (if applicable), reason for notability, cause of death (if known), and reference.

== August 1985 ==
=== 1 ===
- Sandy Bell, 79, South African cricketer.
- Alois Carigiet, 82, Swiss artist and illustrator.
- F. N. Cook, 80, Australian naval officer.
- Jack Dootson, 71, American politician, member of the Washington House of Representatives (1941–1943, 1951–1953, 1963–1967).
- Helene Engelmann, 87, Austrian Olympic pair skater (1924).
- Edward McClaren, 83, American physician.
- Manuel Meana, 83, Spanish footballer.
- Lawrence D. Miles, 81, American engineer.
- Harry Mittleman, 85, American building contractor and real estate developer.
- Jules Moch, 92, French politician.
- Victoria Mxenge, 43, South African anti-apartheid activist, shot.
- Al Overton, 73, American sound engineer (Diamonds Are Forever).
- Fernando Previtali, 78, Italian conductor.
- Dorothy Burney Richards, 91, American conservationist (Beaversprite).
- James L. Shaver, 83, American politician, lieutenant governor of Arkansas (1943–1947).
- Andy Stynchula, 46, American football player, traffic collision.
- D. H. Turner, 54, English historian and museum curator.
- Joseph Walker, 92, American cinematographer (It's a Wonderful Life, It Happened One Night).
- Patty Willis, 75, American aviator.

=== 2 ===
- Curt F. Bühler, 80, American librarian and literary scholar.
- María Caviglia, 90, Argentine politician.
- Philip Don Estridge, 48, American computer engineer, plane crash.
- Frank Faylen, 79, American actor, respiratory disease.
- Rose Goldsen, 68, American sociologist.
- Bob Holt, 56, American voice actor (The Great Grape Ape Show, The Incredible Hulk, The Lorax), heart attack.
- John S. Rice, 86, American politician and diplomat, ambassador to the Netherlands (1961–1964), member of the Pennsylvania Senate (1933–1940).
- Karl Heinz Stroux, 77, German actor and theatre director.
- Richard Walker, 67, English angler and fishing writer.
- Ralph Younger, 81, British general.

=== 3 ===
- Eileen Beldon, 83, English actress.
- Mosco Carner, 80, Austrian-born British musicologist and conductor.
- Gordon Churchill, 86, Canadian politician, MP (1951–1968).
- Banarasi Das, 73, Indian politician.
- George Dempsey, 79, Australian Olympic racing cyclist (1924).
- Coleman Dowell, 60, American writer, suicide by jumping.
- Miranda Downes, 35, Australian screenwriter, murdered.
- Ludwig Jetzinger, 93, Austrian footballer.
- Alphonse Leboulanger, 79, French racing cyclist.
- Cloy Mattox, 82, American baseball player.
- R. Hunter Middleton, 87, Scottish-born American typeface designer.
- Harry Phillips, 76, American jurist, injuries sustained in a traffic collision.

=== 4 ===
- Mario Dubsky, 46, English artist, AIDS.
- Fritz Eikemeier, 77, German police officer.
- Michel Jourdan, 59, French actor.
- Max Krook, 72, American astrophysicist and mathematician.
- William F. Leonard, 71, American soldier, Medal of Honor recipient.
- Maurice Petherick, 90, British politician, MP (1931–1945).
- Orange Phelps, 98, American politician and theater executive, mayor of Hillsboro, Oregon (1929–1935).
- Ivan Radoev, 83, Bulgarian footballer.
- Mitch Sutton, 34, American football player.
- Zbyněk Vostřák, 65, Czechoslovak composer.
- Don Whillans, 52, English mountaineer, heart attack.
- Q. V. Williamson, 66, American politician, respiratory failure.
- Pierre Young, 59, French-born British engineer and mathematician.

=== 5 ===
- Ernest Adam, 85, Belgian politician.
- Lorne Betts, 67, Canadian composer.
- Aub Charleston, 83, Australian footballer.
- Sir Lionel Denny, 88, British politician, Lord Mayor of London (1965–1966).
- Chester Wilson Emmons, 84, American mycologist.
- Arnold Horween, 87, American football player and coach.
- Olav Kielland, 83, Norwegian composer.
- Ted Kimball, 75, American radio broadcaster.
- Charles Pruitt, 55, American politician, member of the Tennessee House of Representatives (since 1970), heart attack.
- Mona Richardson, 38, American singer and actress.
- Gladys Byram Shepperd, 83, American educator.
- Francis Xavier Thomas, 79, Australian Roman Catholic prelate.
- Arnold Wilkins, 78, British radar developer.

=== 6 ===
- Krystyna Ankwicz, 78, Polish actress.
- William Anstruther-Gray, Baron Kilmany, 80, Scottish politician, MP (1931–1945, 1951–1956).
- Leon Bogues, 57, American politician, lung cancer.
- Forbes Burnham, 62, Guyanese politician, president (since 1980) and prime minister (1964–1980), heart failure.
- Ninni Cassarà, 38, Italian police officer, shot.
- Juanita Craft, 83, American civil rights activist and politician.
- Ramón Ernesto Cruz Uclés, 82, Honduran politician, president (1971–1972).
- Karl Diebitsch, 86, German artist and SS weapon designer.
- Ken Ernst, 67, American cartoonist.
- Ann Govednik, 69, American Olympic swimmer (1932, 1936).
- John Harmon, 80, American actor.
- Jeanne Helbling, 82, French actress.
- Johann Kurz, 71, Austrian Roman Catholic prelate.
- George Leite, 64, American author.
- Ronald Melville, 82, English botanist.
- Dorothy Pantin, 89, Manx surgeon.
- Enrico Ruberti, 70, Italian Olympic rower (1948).

=== 7 ===
- Joanne Cole, 51, British artist and illustrator (Bod), cancer.
- Alan Fitch, 70, British politician, MP (1958–1983).
- Irene Gilbert, 76-77, Irish fashion designer.
- Grayson Hall, 62, American actress (The Night of the Iguana, One Life to Live, Dark Shadows), lung cancer.
- Barrington Hill, 70, English cricketer.
- Edward Mowinckel-Larsen, 90, Norwegian engineer.
- Juan Nelson, 94, Argentine Olympic polo player (1924, 1936).
- David Robertson, 84, Scottish-American footballer.
- Johnny Rucker, 68, American baseball player.
- Gábor Szegő, 90, Hungarian-American mathematician.

=== 8 ===
- Benny Barnes, 51, American singer.
- Louise Brooks, 78, American actress (Pandora's Box, Diary of a Lost Girl, Beggars of Life), heart attack.
- Alfredo De Marsico, 97, Italian politician.
- Roddie Edmonds, 65, American soldier and humanitarian.
- Milton H. Greene, 63, American photographer, lymphoma.
- Sayed Houda, 84, Egyptian footballer.
- Les Jago, 77, Australian footballer.
- Louis Meeuwessen, 81, Dutch Olympic boxer (1924).
- Edward Pimental, 20, American soldier, shot.
- Gennaro Vitiello, 55, Italian actor and director.
- Leo Weisgerber, 86, German linguist.

=== 9 ===
- Fred Åkerström, 48, Swedish singer and guitarist.
- Mario J. Cariello, 78, American politician and jurist, cancer.
- Clive Churchill, 58, Australian rugby player and coach.
- Garrett W. Hagedorn, 74, American politician, member of the New Jersey Senate (since 1968), heart attack.
- Willem Kremer, 89, Dutch theologian.
- Lance McCaskill, 85, New Zealand conservationist.
- Florence Mophosho, 64, South African anti-apartheid activist.
- Mauri Sariola, 60, Finnish novelist.
- Thelma Van Norte, 73, American medical librarian.

=== 10 ===
- Kenny Baker, 72, American singer and actor, heart attack.
- Nate Barragar, 78, American football player.
- Louise Landry Gadbois, 88, Canadian painter.
- Yaakov Yisrael Kanievsky, 85-86, Ukrainian-born Israeli rabbi.
- Beryl H. Potter, 84, American astronomer.
- Edward Ernest Swanstrom, 82, American Roman Catholic prelate.

=== 11 ===
- Frank Birkenhead, 87, English comedian (Morris and Cowley).
- Kurt Bühligen, 67, German flying ace.
- Nick Ceroli, 45, American drummer, heart attack.
- Manuel Conde, 69, Filipino actor and filmmaker.
- János Drapál, 37, Hungarian racing cyclist, racing crash.
- Sir John Grace, 80, New Zealand diplomat.
- Hector Grey, 81, Scottish businessman.
- Helen Webb Harris, 85, American educator, golfer and playwright.
- Pavel Korovkin, 72, Soviet mathematician.
- Manuel António Vassalo e Silva, 85, Portuguese colonial administrator.

=== 12 ===
- Billy Devore, 74, American racing driver.
- Folke Fridell, 80, Swedish writer.
- Sir Harry Godwin, 84, English botanist.
- Patrick Hines, 55, American actor, heart attack.
- Alfons Luczny, 91, German general.
- Jack Manke, 68, American politician, member of the South Dakota Senate (since 1981), heart attack.
- Jim Pender, 73, Australian footballer.
- Kåre Stokkeland, 67, Norwegian politician.
- Manfred Winkelhock, 33, German racing driver, racing crash.
- Xiao Hua, 69, Chinese general.
- Notable people killed in the crash of Japan Air Lines Flight 123:
  - Kyu Sakamoto, 43, Japanese singer ("Sukiyaki")
  - Masanori Tsuji, 39, Japanese Olympic racing cyclist (1964)
  - Nakaakira Tsukahara, 51, Japanese neurologist and professor.

=== 13 ===
- Slobodan Aligrudić, 50, Yugoslav actor.
- Albert Bonzano, 80, French Olympic rower (1924, 1928).
- Cecil Browne, 89, Canadian ice hockey player.
- Edwin Duerr, 81, American theatre director.
- Josef Fath, 73, German footballer.
- Ida Lough, 82, New Zealand weaver.
- J. Willard Marriott, 84, American business executive (Marriott Corporation), heart attack.
- Marion Martin, 76, American actress.
- Shiva Naipaul, 40, Trinidadian-British novelist and journalist, heart attack.
- Paul Edward Paget, 84, English architect.
- Åse Gruda Skard, 79, Norwegian psychologist.
- Nelson B. Tinnin, 79, American politician, member of the Missouri Senate (1961–1985).

=== 14 ===
- Manuel Armanqué, 84, Spanish Olympic water polo player (1920).
- Bobbie Barwell, 89, New Zealand photographer.
- Marie Bell, 84, French actress and theatre director.
- Józef Chlebowczyk, 61, Polish historian.
- Dick Crayne, 72, American football player.
- María Olimpia de Obaldía, 93, Panamanian poet.
- Nazlı Ecevit, 85, Turkish painter.
- Sergio Galeotti, 40, Italian architect and businessman (Armani), heart attack.
- Alfred Hayes, 74, American poet and screenwriter.
- Lina Heydrich, 74, German memoirist.
- Walter C. Langsam, 79, American academic administrator.
- Murray Shelton, 92, American football player.
- Merwin H. Silverthorn, 88, American general.
- Gale Sondergaard, 86, American actress (Anthony Adverse, Anna and the King of Siam, The Mark of Zorro).

=== 15 ===
- Cecil Boswell, 75, English cricketer.
- Joe Carveth, 67, Canadian ice hockey player.
- Lester Cole, 81, American screenwriter, part of the Hollywood Ten, heart attack.
- Donald Ferguson, 64, American Olympic racing cyclist (1956).
- Ivan Gronsky, 90, Soviet writer.
- Christian Alusine Kamara-Taylor, 68, Sierra Leonean politician, prime minister (1975–1978).
- Bernard Loomer, 73, American theologian.
- Robert Maxwell, 83, American Olympic runner (1928).
- Leon Prima, 78, American trumpeter.
- Sidney A. von Luther, 60, American politician, member of the New York State Senate (1971–1974).
- Richard Yardumian, 68, American composer, heart attack.

=== 16 ===
- John Brent, 47, American comedian and actor.
- Dick Drott, 49, American baseball player, stomach cancer.
- Philip J. Lewis, 84, Canadian politician.
- Mario Majoni, 75, Italian Olympic water polo player (1948).
- Géza Toldi, 76, Hungarian footballer.
- Joseph Henry Wegstein, 63, American computer scientist.

=== 17 ===
- Gaspare Ambrosini, 98, Italian politician and jurist.
- Nicholas Eden, 2nd Earl of Avon, 54, British politician and hereditary peer.
- Matsuo Kishi, 78, Japanese filmmaker.
- Honesto Mayoralgo, 51, Filipino basketball player and coach.
- Henriette Mertz, 89, American fringe archaeologist.
- Anatoly Timofeyev, 97, Russian Olympic fencer (1912).
- Joseph T. White, 23, American soldier and defector to North Korea, drowned.

=== 18 ===
- Edward Johnston Alexander, 84, American botanist.
- Sir Herbert Andrew, 75, English civil servant.
- Julia Arévalo de Roche, 87, Uruguayan politician.
- Arthur E. Baird, 89, American radio game show host (Professor Quiz).
- Irene Caroline Diner Koenigsberger, 88, American chemist.
- Michael Long, 56, British jurist.
- Josip Primožič, 85, Yugoslav Olympic gymnast (1924, 1928).

=== 19 ===
- Herbert Kenneth Airy Shaw, 83, English botanist.
- Arthur Ashwell, 77, English cricketer.
- Edward Cooper, 89, English soldier, Victoria Cross recipient.
- Nate Harlan, 57, American football player and coach.
- Robert W. Hasbrouck, 89, American general, heart failure.
- Rose Angela Horan, 90, American Roman Catholic nun and philosopher.
- Jānis Matulis, 74, Soviet Latvian Lutheran prelate.
- Bobby Reynolds, 54, American college football player, stroke.
- Curtis Howe Springer, 88, American radio evangelist.
- Cedric Wallace, 76, American jazz musician.
- Hōdai Yamazaki, 70, Japanese poet.

=== 20 ===
- Syed Murtaza Fazl Ali, 64, Indian jurist.
- Chow Ching-Wen, 76-77, Chinese human rights activist.
- Clarence Fieber, 71, American baseball player.
- Donald O. Hebb, 81, Canadian neuropsychologist.
- Russ Hoogerhyde, 79, American archer.
- Kenneth Kennedy, 71, Australian Olympic speed skater (1936).
- Harchand Singh Longowal, 53, Indian politician, shot.
- Wilhelm Meendsen-Bohlken, 88, German naval admiral.
- Basil Nicholson, 72, English rugby player.
- Václav Rais, 75, Czechoslovak Olympic fencer (1936).
- William Stockton, 66, American politician, member of the Florida Senate (1967–1968).

=== 21 ===
- E. Richard Barnes, 79, American politician, member of the California State Assembly (1963–1973).
- Sverre Berglie, 74, Norwegian footballer.
- Joseph Eidelberg, 69, Ukrainian-born Israeli linguist and biblical scholar.
- Fernand Guindon, 68, Canadian politician.
- Trygve Heltveit, 71, Norwegian philologist.
- Roy Luebbe, 84, American baseball player.
- David Olère, 83, Polish-born French artist.
- Gheorghe Pintilie, 82, Soviet-Romanian politician and intelligence agent.
- David Reed, 13, American murder victim.
- Maxwell Shaw, 56, British actor.
- Suhaim bin Hamad Al Thani, 51-52, Qatari royal, heart attack.
- István Szendeffy, 85, Hungarian Olympic rower (1924).

=== 22 ===
- Burton Y. Berry, 83, American diplomat.
- Octavian Cotescu, 54, Romanian actor.
- Douglas Darby, 74, Australian politician.
- Leo Dean, 70, Australian footballer.
- Paul Peter Ewald, 97, German physicist and crystallographer.
- Charles Gibson, 65, American historian and anthropologist.
- Christian H. Kahl, 80, American politician.
- Aleksandra Khokhlova, 87, Soviet actress and theatre director.
- Peter Torleivson Molaug, 82, Norwegian politician.
- Jerry O'Sullivan, 45, Irish hurler, heart attack.
- Alice Piper, 76, American Paiute activist.
- Turgut Uyar, 58, Turkish poet, cirrhosis.

=== 23 ===
- Bohumila Bednářová, 81, Czech astronomer.
- Ginty Lush, 71, Australian cricketer.
- Luís Matoso, 83, Brazilian footballer.
- Arne Nic. Sandnes, 65, Norwegian politician.
- Wang Kunlun, 83, Chinese politician.

=== 24 ===
- Robert P. Alexander, 80, American philatelist.
- William V. Banks, 82, American lawyer and radio station proprietor.
- Paul Creston, 78, American composer.
- Colin Crompton, 54, English comedian, lung cancer.
- L.C. Green, 63, American blues musician.
- Adolphe Groscol, 81, Belgian Olympic sprinter (1928).
- Storm Herseth, 87, Norwegian chess player.
- Svend Holm, 89, Danish footballer.
- B. J. Kaston, 79, American arachnologist.
- Noel Martin, 92, British golfer and soldier.
- Boots McClain, 86, American baseball player.
- John Reid, 84, New Zealand diplomat.
- Morrie Ryskind, 89, American screenwriter, playwright, and political activist.
- Soledad Salvador, 28, Filipino activist, beheaded.

=== 25 ===
- Robin Andrew, 72, New Zealand lawn bowler.
- Ernst Aust, 62, German political activist.
- Rudi Blesh, 86, American jazz critic, heart attack.
- Arthur Chresby, 77, Australian politician, MP (1958–1961).
- Eugenio Della Casa, 84, Italian Olympic water polo player (1924).
- Paul Harris, 67, American actor.
- Lloyd Hyde, 65, Canadian politician.
- Jee Yong-ju, 36, South Korean boxer, stabbed.
- Robert D. Morrow Sr., 90, American politician.
- Ellis E. Patterson, 87, American politician, lieutenant governor of California (1939–1943), member of the U.S. House of Representatives (1945–1947), cancer.
- Austin Punch, 91, Australian cricketer.
- Fred Raul, 72, Austrian actor.
- Fabri Salcedo, 71, Spanish-born American footballer.
- Samantha Smith, 13, American peace activist and actress (Lime Street), plane crash.
- Hermann Tunner, 72, Austrian Olympic discus thrower (1948).
- Dick Wakefield, 64, American baseball player.
- Pino Zac, 55, Italian cartoonist, stroke.

=== 26 ===
- Chang Ch'i-yun, 83, Chinese politician and historian.
- Stu Clarke, 79, American baseball player.
- Norman Douglas, 75, New Zealand politician, MP (1960–1975).
- Åke Fridell, 66, Swedish actor.
- Fred Louis Lerch, 83, Austrian-German actor.
- Per Monsen, 72, Norwegian newspaper editor.
- Sir Edward Paris, 96, British scientist and civil servant.
- Leopoldo Querol, 85, Spanish pianist.
- Ole Rømer Aagaard Sandberg, 85, Norwegian politician.
- Charles W. Sandman Jr., 63, American politician, member of the U.S. House of Representatives (1967–1975), complications from a stroke.
- Norman Schneider, 96, Canadian politician, MP (1952–1958).

=== 27 ===
- John Albrechtson, 49, Swedish Olympic sailor (1968, 1972, 1976), suicide.
- Rogelio Crespo, 90, Cuban baseball player.
- John Hurley, 91, Australian politician.
- Johnny Lindell, 68, American baseball player, lung cancer.
- Emile Touma, 66, Israeli journalist and historian.
- J. Stafford Wright, 80, British theologian.

=== 28 ===
- Ruth Gordon, 88, American actress (Rosemary's Baby, Inside Daisy Clover) and screenwriter (Adam's Rib).
- Berry Johnson, 79, New Zealand rower.
- Iván Marino Ospina, 45, Colombian guerrilla militant, co-founder of the 19th of April Movement, shot.
- Hugh Norman-Walker, 68, British colonial administrator.
- Miguel Otero Silva, 76, Venezuelan writer and politician, heart disease.
- Vince Oliver, 69, American basketball and football player.
- F. Mason Sones, 66, American physician, lung cancer.
- Surya Wonowidjojo, 62, Indonesian cigarette company executive.

=== 29 ===
- Alexander Abramsky, 87, Soviet composer.
- Evelyn Ankers, 67, British-American actress (The Wolf Man), ovarian cancer.
- George Bagby, 78, American novelist, cancer.
- Patrick Barr, 77, English actor.
- Lise Børsum, 76, Norwegian World War II resistance member.
- Homer Chase, 68, American communist activist.
- Michael Codd, 69, American police commissioner, heart attack.
- Leo Freisinger, 69, American Olympic speed skater (1936).
- Earl Goheen, 90, American sports coach.
- Paul Kligman, 62, Canadian voice actor (Spider-Man, The Marvel Super Heroes, Rudolph the Red-Nosed Reindeer), heart failure.
- Michel Pécheux, 74, French Olympic fencer (1936, 1948).
- M. K. Radha, 74, Indian actor.
- Marco Rigau Gaztambide, 66, Puerto Rican jurist.
- Gholamreza Rouhani, 88, Iranian poet.
- Marguerite Engler Schwarzman, 93, American educator.

=== 30 ===
- Paul Bryar, 75, American actor.
- Taylor Caldwell, 84, British-born American novelist, respiratory failure.
- José Cubero Sánchez, 21, Spanish bullfighter, gored.
- Tom Howard, 75, British special effects artist (2001: A Space Odyssey).
- Gerhardt W. Hyatt, 69, American general.
- Philly Joe Jones, 62, American jazz drummer, heart attack.
- Douglas Eric Kimmins, 80, British entomologist.
- Josy Koelsch, 58, French Olympic canoer (1952).
- Paul H. Landis, 84, American sociologist.
- Nora Fry Lavrin, 87-88, English illustrator.
- Euan Miller, 88, British general.
- Yvonne Netter, 96, French feminist activist.
- Tatiana Proskouriakoff, 76, Russian-born American archaeologist.
- Erwin Righter, 88, American football and basketball player.
- Tatsu Tanaka, 93, Japanese politician.

=== 31 ===
- Sir Macfarlane Burnet, 85, Australian virologist, Nobel Prize recipient (1960), colorectal cancer.
- Vasily Golubev, 60, Soviet painter.
- Boris Kovzan, 63, Soviet fighter pilot.
- Tom Morrison, 72, New Zealand rugby player.
- No Robbery, 25, American Thoroughbred racehorse.
- John Patric, 83, American writer (National Geographic).
- Clyde Smoll, 71, American baseball player.
- Joseph Carmine Zavatt, 84, American jurist.
