= John Lush =

John Lush may refer to:

- Johnny Lush, American baseball player
- John Lush (priest), Archdeacon of Southland
- John Alfred Lush, English politician
- Ginty Lush (John Grantley Lush), Australian cricketer
