= Pantin (disambiguation) =

Pantin is a commune in the northeastern suburbs of Paris, France.

Pantin may also refer to:

- Pantin (Paris RER), a railway station in Pantin
- Pantin (surname)
- Pantin, an alternative name for the Nebbiolo wine grape variety

== See also ==
- Panten, a municipality in the district of Lauenburg, in Schleswig-Holstein, Germany.
- Pantaenus, a Greek theologian and a significant figure in the Catechetical School of Alexandria from around AD 180.
