= Ginty =

Ginty is an Irish surname and, less commonly, a given name that may refer to:

== Surname ==
- David Ginty (born 1962), American neuroscientist and developmental biologist
- George Clay Ginty (born February 14, 1840 – December 9, 1890) American politician and journalist
- James Francis Ginty (born 1980), American actor
- James Ginty (athlete) (born 4 April 1908) British middle-distance runner
- John Ginty (born 1972) is an American organist
- Robert Ginty (born 1948), American movie actor, producer, scenarist, and director
- Rory Ginty (born 1977), Irish football midfielder

== Given name ==
- Ginty Lush (14 October 1913 – 23 August 1985) Australian cricketer
- Ginty Vrede (1985 – 2008), professional Dutch kickboxer, and 2008 WBC Heavyweight Muay Thai World champion

== Other uses ==
- Ginty, the Stone Giant, a character from the 2011 video game Dota 2.

== See also ==
- McGinty, surname
