= Arne Sandnes =

Arne Sandnes is the name of:

- Arne Nic. Sandnes (1920–1985), Norwegian politician for the Conservative Party
- Arne Sandnes (Rogaland) (1925–2006), Norwegian politician for the Conservative Party
- Arne Sandnes (Nord-Trøndelag) (1924–2016), Norwegian politician for the Centre Party
