= Marguerite Engler =

Marguerite Engler may refer to:

- Marguerite Engler Schwarzman (1892–1985), American educator
- Marguerite M. Engler (1956–2023), American nurse scientist
