= Tinnin =

Tinnin is a surname. Notable people with the surname include:

- Glenna Smith Tinnin (1877–1945), American suffragist
- Nelson B. Tinnin (1905–1985), American politician
- Nick Tinnin, American politician
