= Morris Cowley =

Car model

Morris Cowley was a name given to various cars produced by Morris from 1915 to 1958.

== Morris Cowley Bullnose (1915–1920) ==
Morris Cowley Continental Cowley
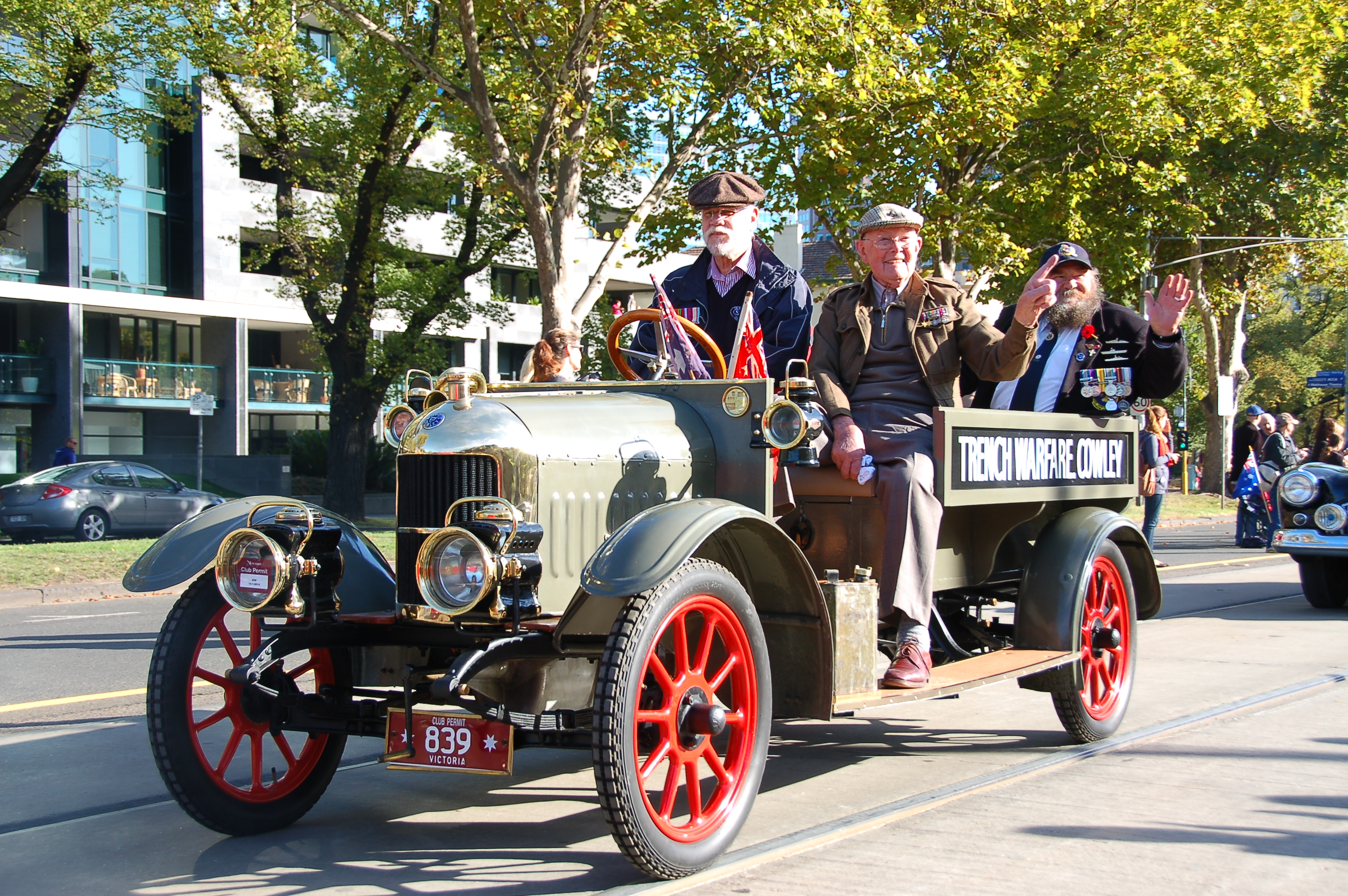
- Van (top removed) manufactured November 1916

Overview
- Manufacturer: W R M Motors Limited
- Production: 1915–1920; 1450 approx
- Assembly: United Kingdom: Cowley, Oxford
- Designer: W R Morris & Hans Landstad

Body and chassis
- Class: midsize car
- Body style: two-seater, four-seater, coupé, cabriolet and delivery van
- Related: Morris Oxford bullnose

Powertrain
- Engine: 1495 cc Continental Red Seal Type U
- Transmission: dry 2-plate clutch, 3-speed gearbox (in cast aluminium housing), universal joint in a housing by the gearbox, propeller shaft enclosed by torque tube, rear axle: ¾ floating single piece banjo casing, spiral bevel final drive

Dimensions
- Wheelbase: 8' 6" 102 in (2,590.8 mm); Track 4' 0" 48 in (1,219.2 mm)

Chronology
- Successor: Morris Cowley (1919 model)

The Continental Cowley, shown to the press in April 1915, was a larger engined (1495 cc against 1018 cc), longer, wider and better-equipped version of the first Morris Oxford with the same "Bullnose" radiator; in addition it could carry a four-passenger body. To reduce the price, many components were bought from United States suppliers. The 1495 cc, side-valve, four-cylinder engine was made by Continental Motor Manufacturing Company of Detroit, and the clutch and three-speed gearbox by Detroit Gear & Machine Co. Back axle, front axle and steering gear also came from the USA. Supply of these components was badly affected by the First World War. The suspension used semi-elliptic leaf springs at the front and three-quarter-elliptics at the rear.

The central position of the handbrake and ball-change gear lever revealed the gearbox's US origin. It also made for easy entry through the driver's door and no cold steel up a driver's leg. The petrol tank was in the scuttle, and its filler was above the gear lever in the centre of the dashboard.

The US-made back axle was the first helically cut drive in a quantity-produced British car.

Electric lighting was standard. It was the first Morris car to be sold like that. The six-volt Lucas lamps were a set of five, powered by a belt-driven dynamo fixed to the engine by its cylinder head studs. The cost of these few electrical components was equivalent to 59% of the cost of the imported engine. The delivery van body was not provided with electric lighting.

=== More expensive than Oxford ===
There was no austerity for the Cowley, though it was at first slightly cheaper than the Oxford. There was diamond-patterned buttoned upholstery in real leather set off by mahogany cappings, and a proper door for the driver. The mudguards were black and the standard body colour was a chocolate brown. The Cowley did not become a stripped-down Oxford until 1919.

=== McKenna duties ===
Although first shown to the press in April 1915, the new car was not generally available until late summer that year, just when the government suddenly imposed the McKenna duties. A tax of 33% was imposed on imported "luxury" goods, but demand for the Cowleys seemed to ignore the price rises.

Continental engined Cowleys	1915	1916	1917	1918	1919	1920
cars produced	161	684	125	198	281	1

The last Continental Cowley was assembled in 1920, finishing the stock of original engines. Three thousand engines were despatched to Morris but more than half were lost by enemy action while crossing the Atlantic, leaving around 1,500 sets of certain chassis components unsold. More recent research suggests that there may have been only one shipment of about 150 lost through enemy action, and orders for more shipments were cancelled.

=== Designed for mass production ===
The first Morris Cowley incorporated American automobile engineering and production techniques. The cars were designed for quantity production before Morris expanded mass production in the 1920s. The cars developed a reputation for reliability and durability.

=== Bullnose and Flatnose engines U.S. and Coventry made ===
Continental Red Seal Type U 1495 / 1557

Overview
- Manufacturer: Continental Motor Manufacturing Company; Muskegon and Detroit USA
- Production: 1915

Layout
- Configuration: straight-4 cast en bloc
- Displacement: nominal 1.495 L (91.2 cu in) actual 1.557 L (95.0 cu in)
- Cylinder bore: nominal 69 mm (2.7 in) actual 69.8 mm (2.75 in)
- Piston stroke: nominal 100 mm (3.9 in) actual 101.6 mm (4.00 in)
- Cylinder block material: cast-iron 3-bearing crankshaft pistons: cast-iron crankshaft: Desaxé, white metal bearings in phosphor bronze shells, sump cast aluminium
- Cylinder head material: cast-iron detachable; fitted with priming taps; plain copper gasket
- Valvetrain: side valve L-head, helical timing gears

Combustion
- Fuel system: carburettor: Zenith gravity fed horizontal magneto: American Bosch type NU 4; Dixie type 40 A; Thomson-Bennett type AD4C
- Fuel type: petrol
- Oil system: main bearings: pressure lubricated by plunger pump, pressure test by special tap. big ends: splash. if not first, one of the first British cars with a dipstick
- Cooling system: water thermosyphon, fan assisted radiator by Doherty Motor Components or Randle, both of Coventry

Output
- Power output: not published RAC (tax) rating 11.9hp actual RAC (tax) rating 12.08hp

Chronology
- Successor: Hotchkiss

Hotchkiss later Morris 1548

Overview
- Manufacturer: Hotchkiss & Cie. Gosford Street Coventry until May 1923, works thereafter under the ownership of Morris Engines Limited
- Production: 1919–1926

Layout
- Configuration: straight-4 cast en bloc with upper crankcase
- Displacement: 1.548 L (94.5 cu in)
- Cylinder bore: 69.5 mm (2.74 in)
- Piston stroke: 102 mm (4.0 in)
- Cylinder block material: cast-iron 3-bearing crankshaft pistons: cast-iron crankshaft: steel stamping, bronze backed white metal bearings, sump cast aluminium
- Cylinder head material: cast-iron detachable copper asbestos sandwich gasket
- Valvetrain: side valve L-head, helical timing gears, camshaft in two plain bearings operating valves by mushroom head tappets, single valve springs

Combustion
- Fuel system: carburettor: 1919-1921 Zenith; 1922 S.U.; 1923-1926 Smith (various); exhaust: 3-port: 4-port from February 1922; magneto: helical bevel drive: 1919 Thomson-Bennett G4*; 1920 B T-H; 1921-23 Lucas E4 (B T-H magdyno if no self starter); 1924-26 Lucas GA4
- Fuel type: petrol
- Oil system: main bearings and camshaft gear: pressure lubricated by plunger pump from camshaft big ends: splash
- Cooling system: water thermosyphon, fan assisted radiator 1919 by Randle, thereafter by Osberton

Output
- Power output: not published RAC (tax) rating 11.9hp

Chronology
- Predecessor: Continental Red Seal

Morris 1802

Overview
- Manufacturer: Morris Engines Limited; Gosford Street Coventry
- Production: 1923–1926

Layout
- Configuration: straight-4 cast en bloc with upper crankcase
- Displacement: 1.802 L (110.0 cu in)
- Cylinder bore: 75 mm (3.0 in)
- Piston stroke: 102 mm (4.0 in)
- Cylinder block material: cast-iron 3-bearing crankshaft pistons: cast-iron crankshaft: steel stamping, bronze backed white metal bearings, sump cast aluminium
- Cylinder head material: cast-iron detachable copper asbestos sandwich gasket
- Valvetrain: side valve L-head, helical timing gears, camshaft in two plain bearings operating valves by mushroom head tappets, single valve springs

Combustion
- Fuel system: carburettor: Smith (various) exhaust: 4-port magneto: helical bevel drive: 1923 Lucas E4 (B T-H magdyno if no self starter); 1924-26 Lucas GA4
- Fuel type: petrol
- Oil system: main bearings and camshaft gear: pressure lubricated by plunger pump from camshaft big ends: splash
- Cooling system: water thermosyphon, fan assisted radiator: Osberton

Output
- Power output: not published RAC (tax) rating 13.9hp

Chronology
- Predecessor: Morris 1548 cc

== Morris Cowley Bullnose (1919–1926) ==
Morris Cowley
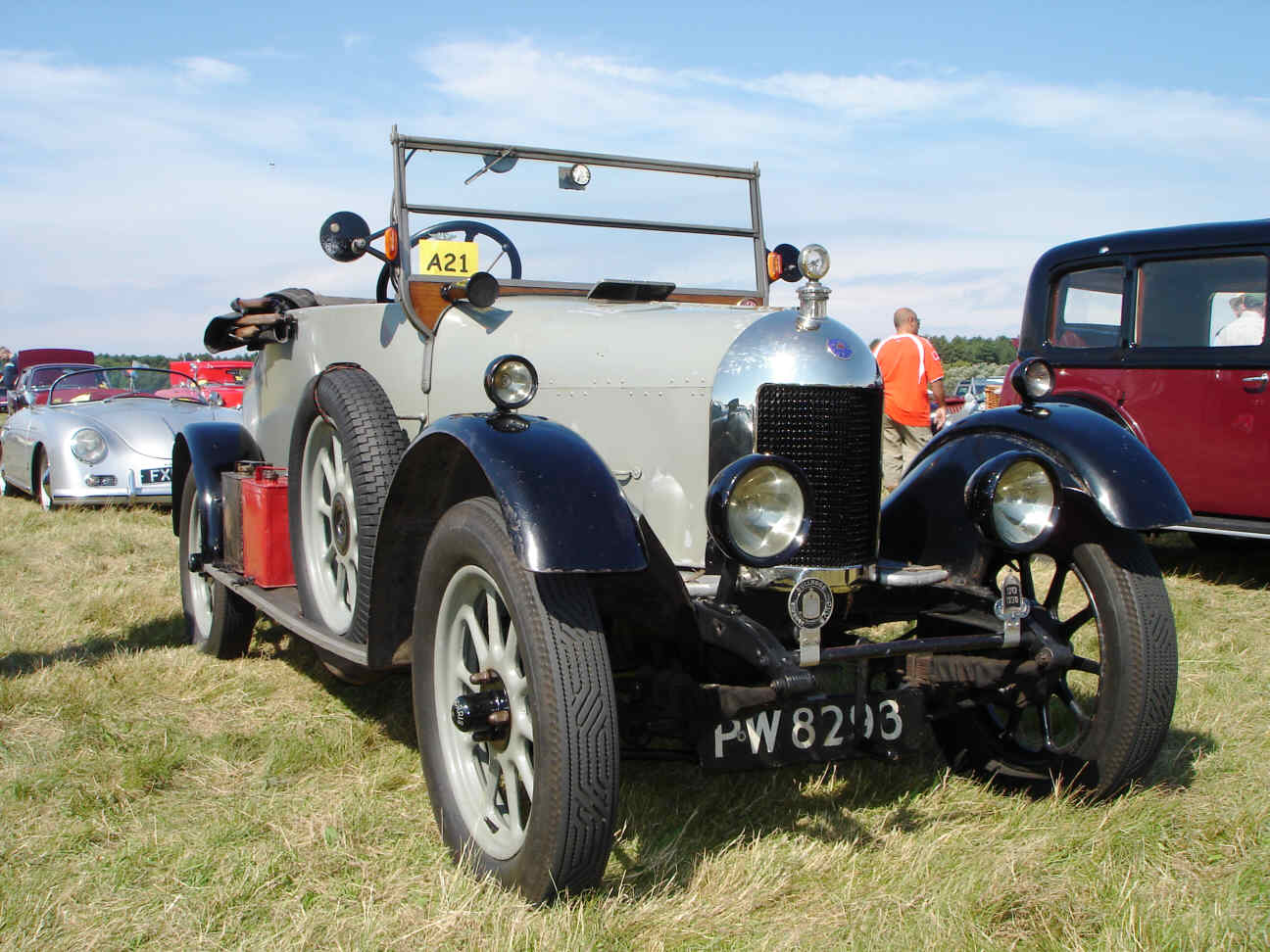
- Two-seater first registered 30 June 1926

Overview
- Manufacturer: Morris
- Production: 1919–1926; 150,000 made (including Oxford model)

Body and chassis
- Related: Morris Oxford bullnose

Powertrain
- Engine: 1548 and 1802 cc side-valve Straight-4

Dimensions
- Wheelbase: 102 inches (2.59 m); 108 inches (2.74 m) from 1925

Chronology
- Predecessor: Morris Cowley 1915
- Successor: Morris Cowley (1926–1931)

The updated Cowley for 1919 had an engine made by the British branch of the French Hotchkiss company, which was essentially a copy of the early Continental unit which was no longer being made. It was the basic model of the Morris two-car range of the time with the Oxford, which used the same 1.5L 26 bhp engine until 1923, having leather upholstery and upgraded lighting as the de-luxe version.

Morris acquired the British interests of Hotchkiss in 1923 and renamed them Morris engines branch.

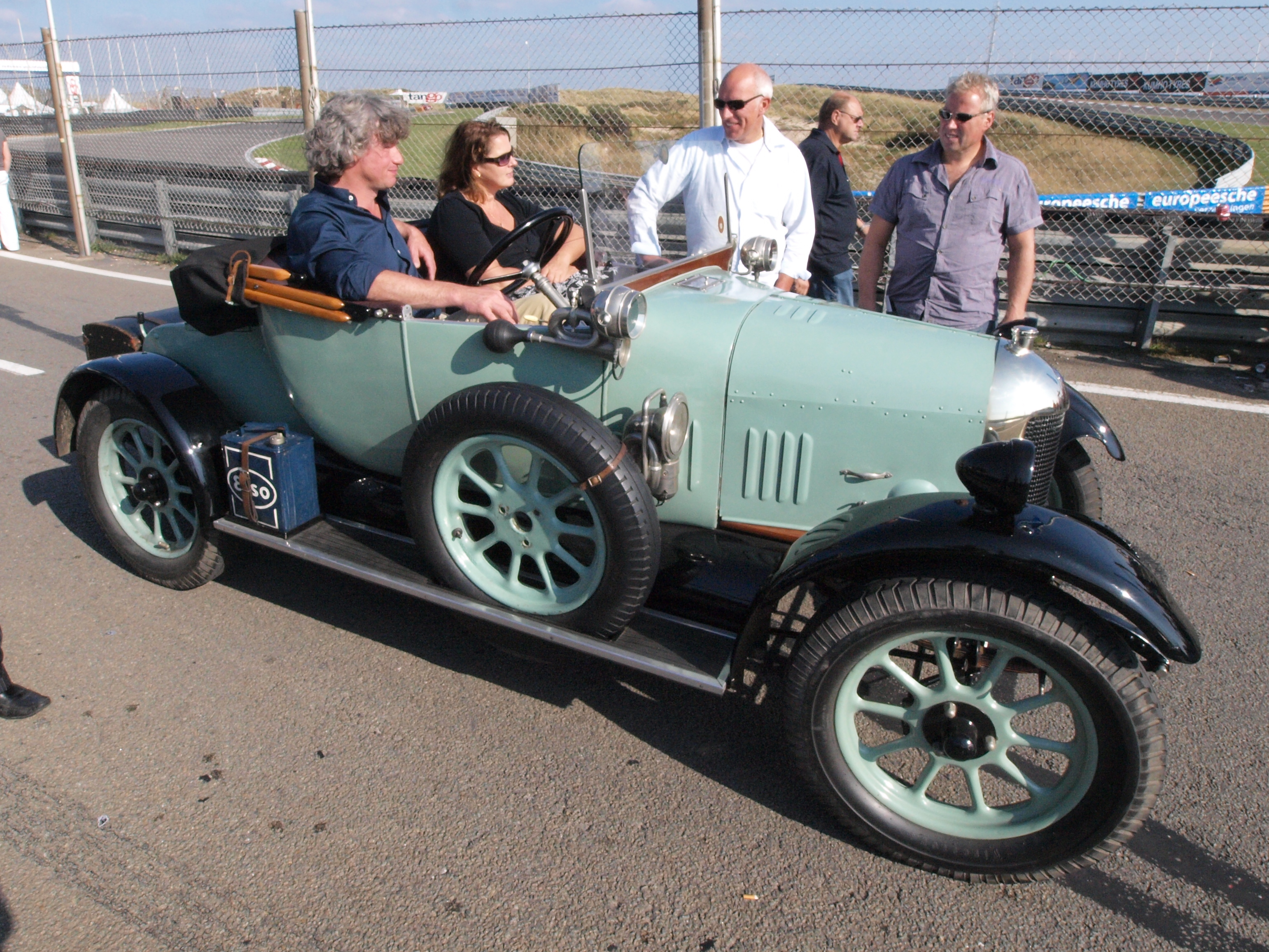
Open two-seater c. 1922

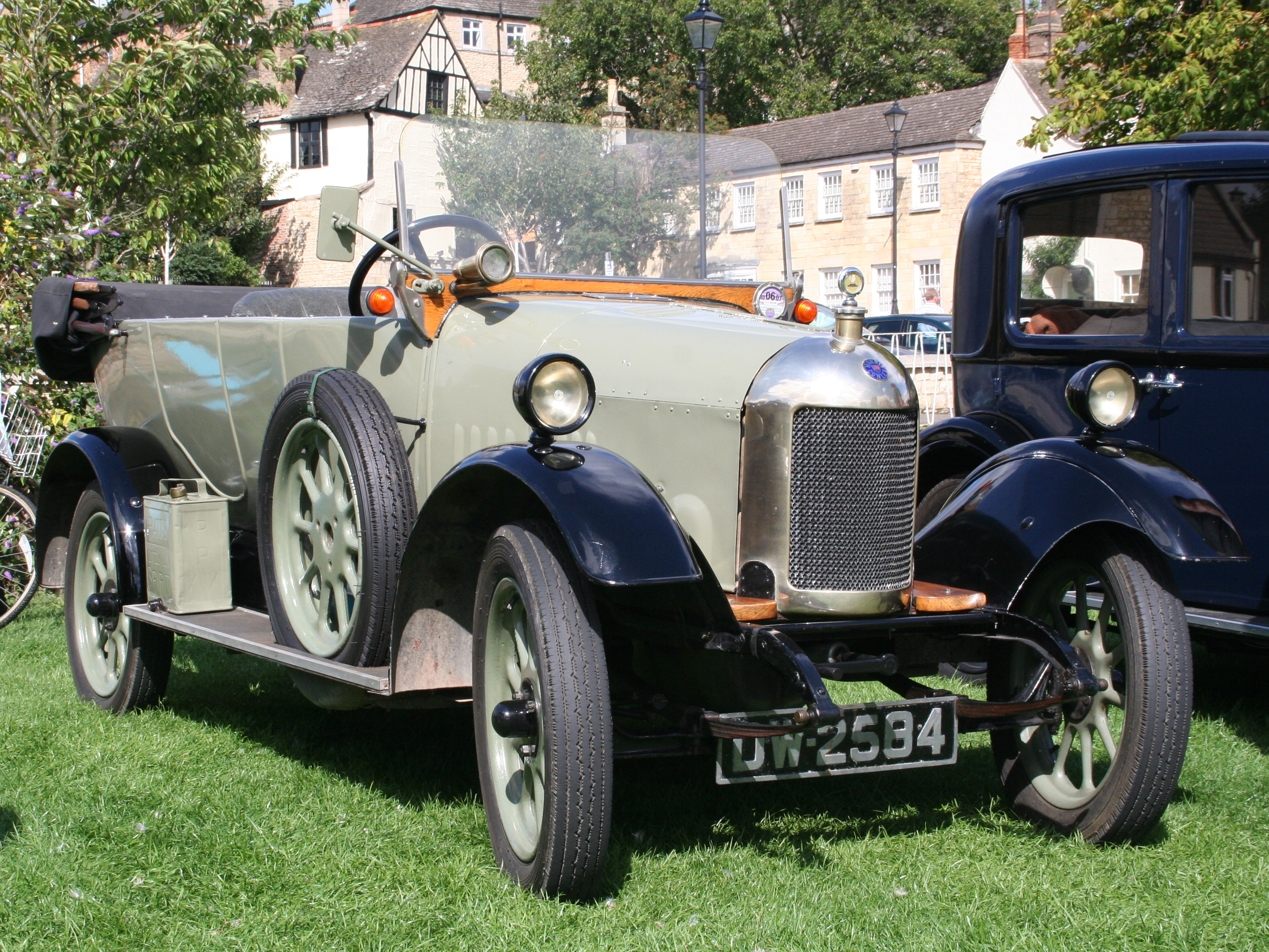
Four door tourer
registered 7 March 1922

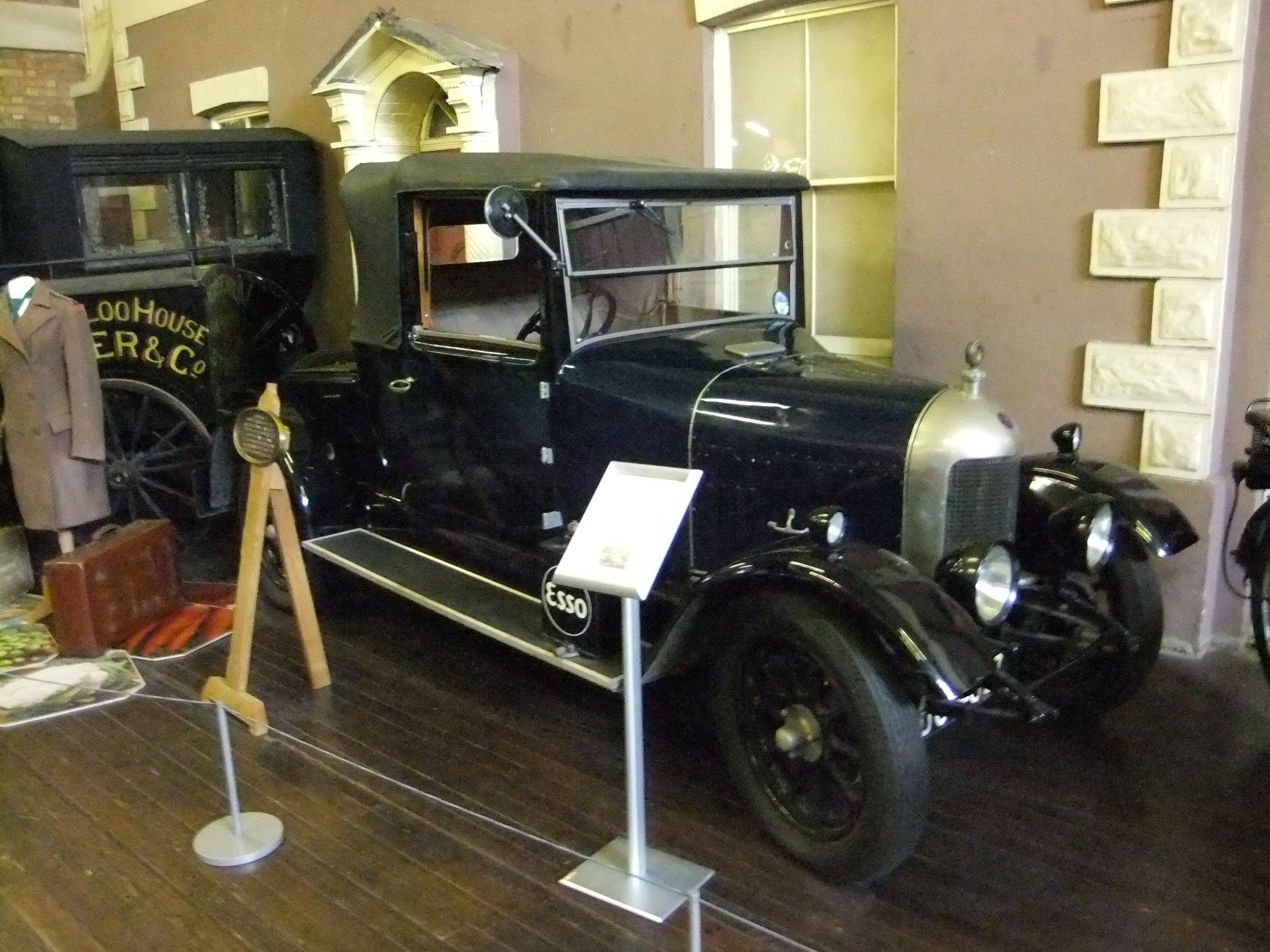
Drophead coupé c. 1922

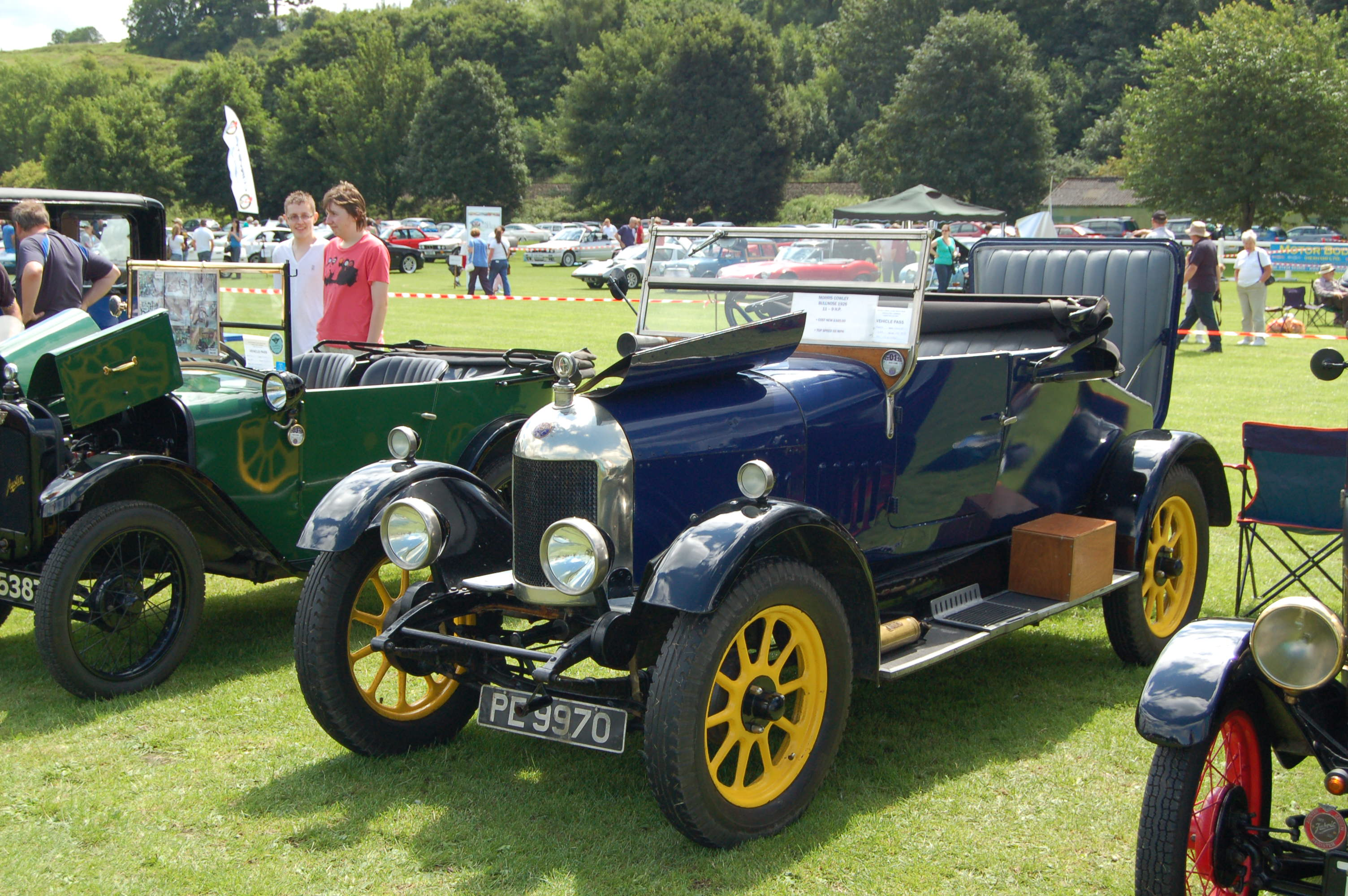
Head down dickey open

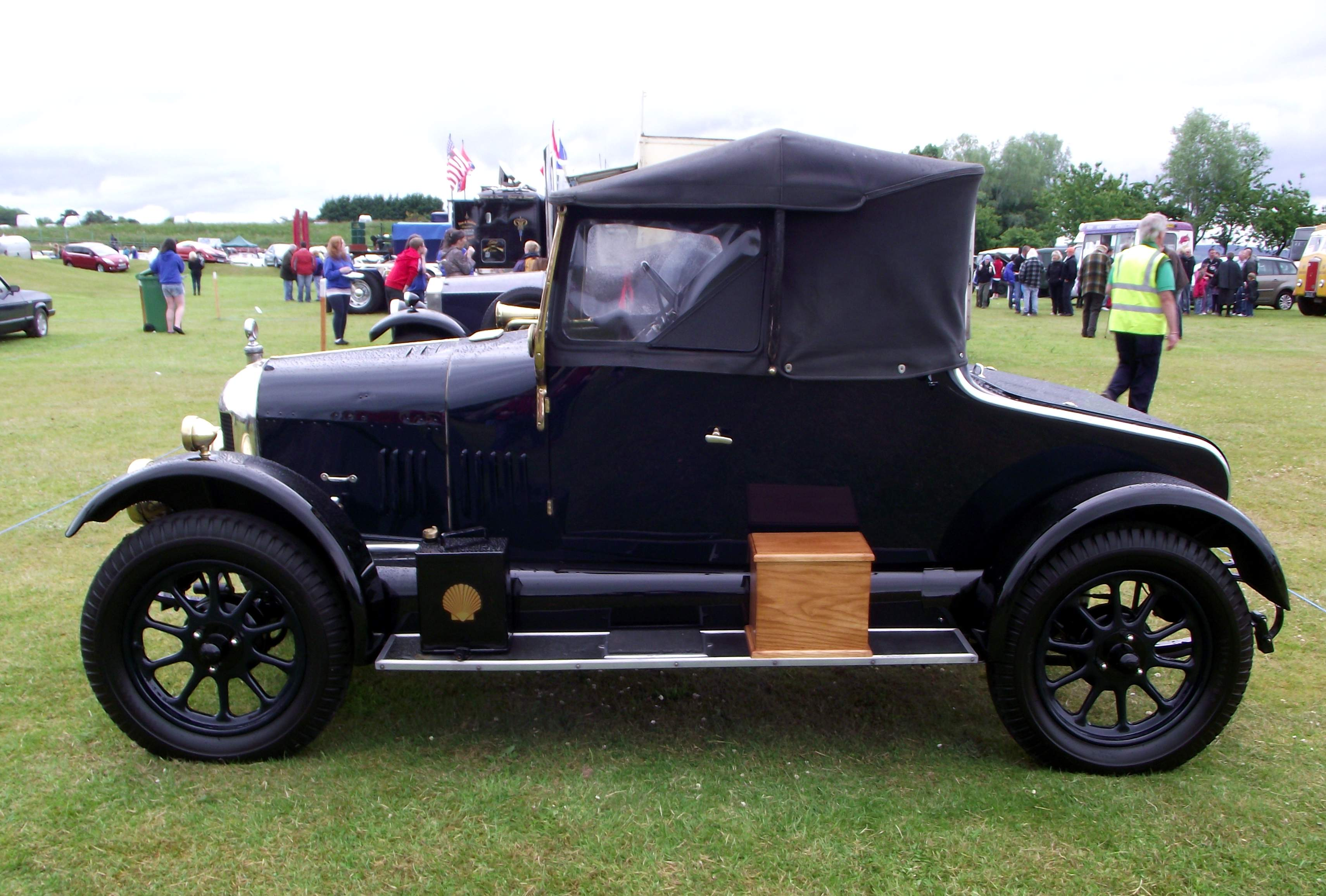
Head up dickey closed

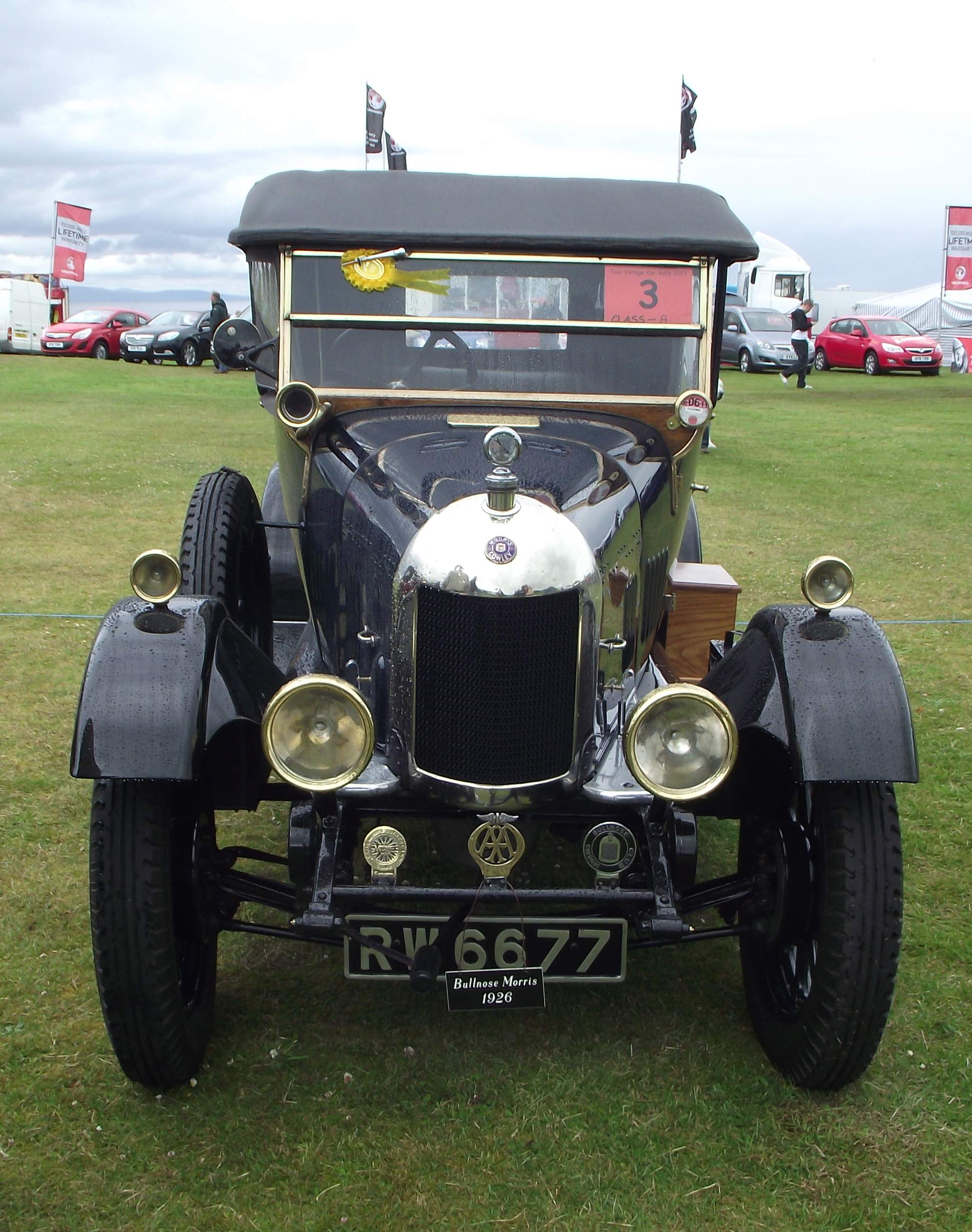
Cowley bullnose

== Morris Cowley Flatnose (1926–1931) ==
Morris Cowley
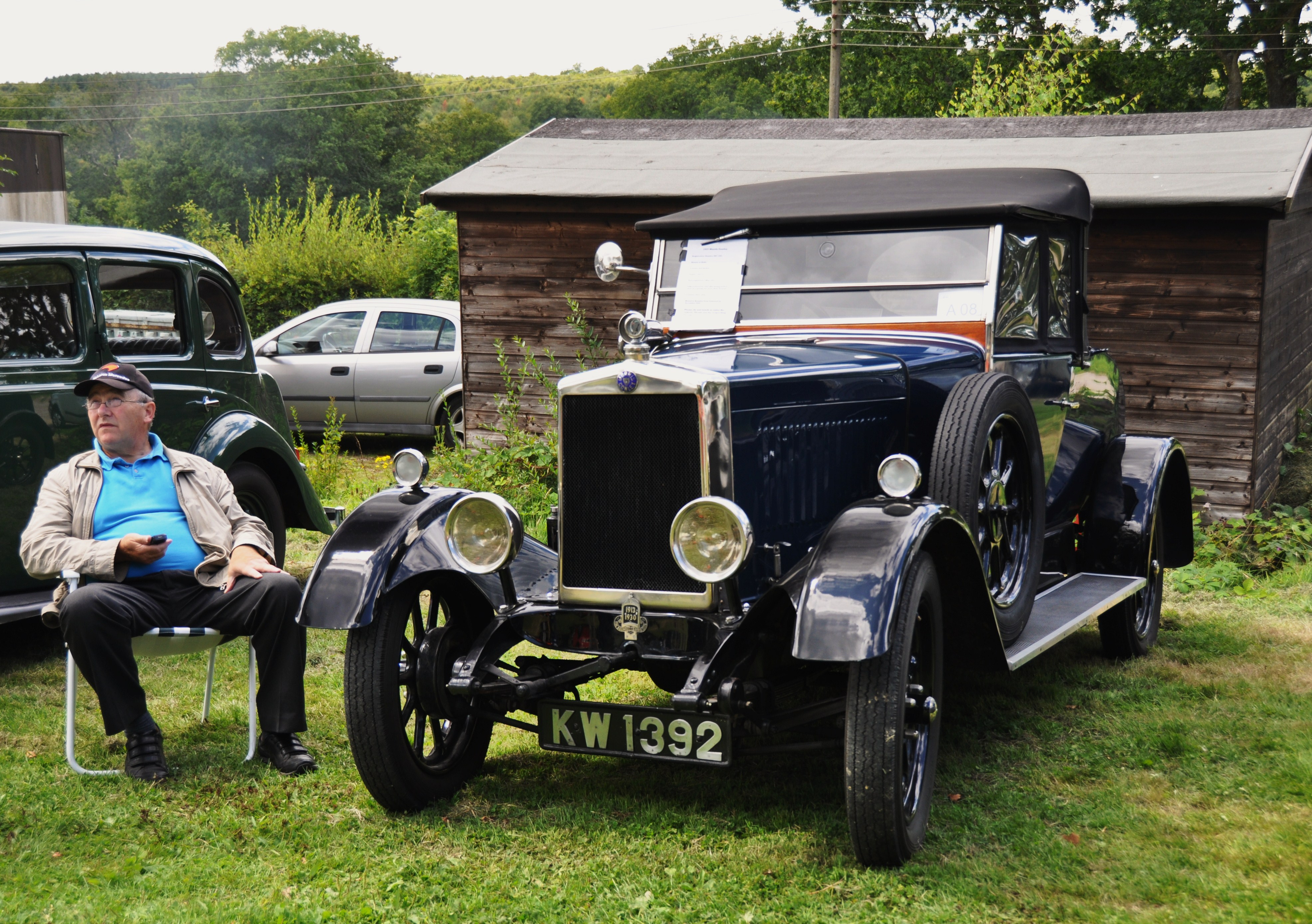
- Two-seater first registered 2 May 1927

Overview
- Manufacturer: Morris
- Production: 1926–1931; 201,692 made.

Body and chassis
- Body style: 2 and 4 seat tourer, coupé, 4-door saloon, folding head saloon (1930).
- Related: Morris Oxford flatnose

Powertrain
- Engine: 1548 cc side-valve Straight-4

Dimensions
- Wheelbase: 102 inches (2560 mm)
- Length: 150 inches (3810 mm)
- Width: 58.5 inches (1486 mm)

Chronology
- Predecessor: Morris Cowley (1919)
- Successor: Morris Cowley (1931)

The Bullnose radiator was replaced by a more conventional flat radiator announced on 11 September 1926 on new cars, now with doors either side and a longer list of accessories supplied as standard. All-steel bodies were becoming available. The engines remained the same, but the Cowley unlike the Oxford, retained braking on the rear wheels only as standard, although a front brake system was available at extra cost (featured car has this fitted). The chassis was new and the suspension was updated with semi-elliptic leaf springs all round plus Smiths friction-type scissor shock absorbers. The brakes are rod-and-spring-operated, with cams inside the drums to actuate. Interesting to note that the rear brake drums include two sets of shoes, one of which is connected directly to the handbrake.

The chassis was further modified in 1931 to bring it in line with the Morris Major. Wire wheels became an option instead of the solid spoked artillery ones previously fitted.

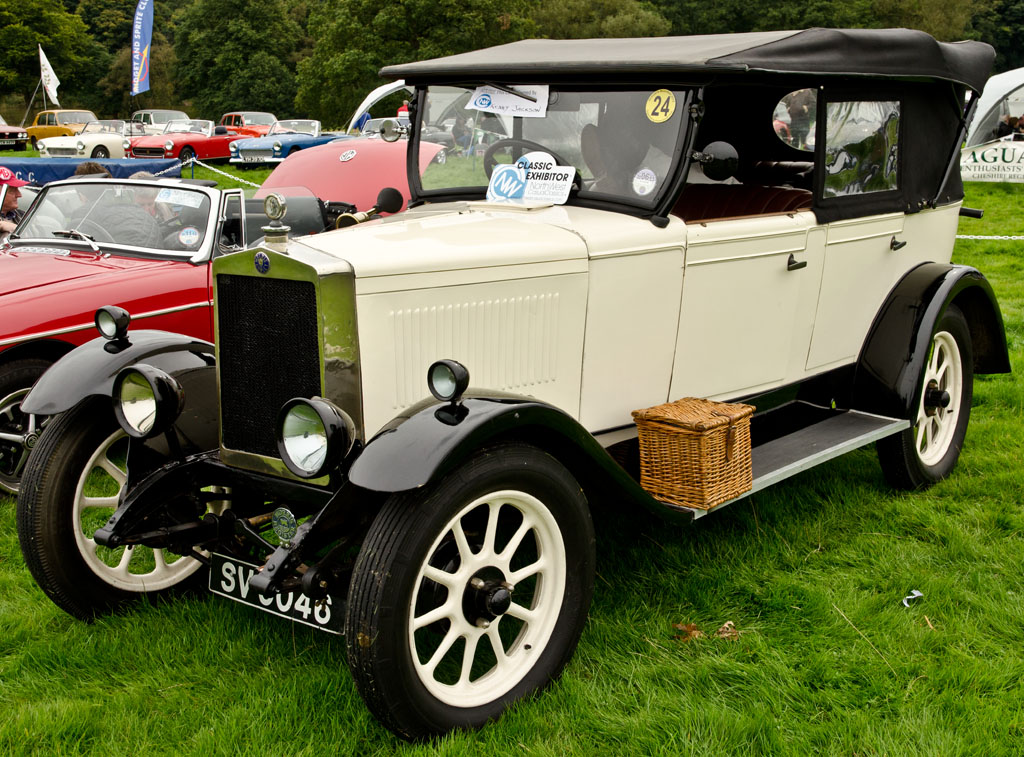
Four-door tourer 1926

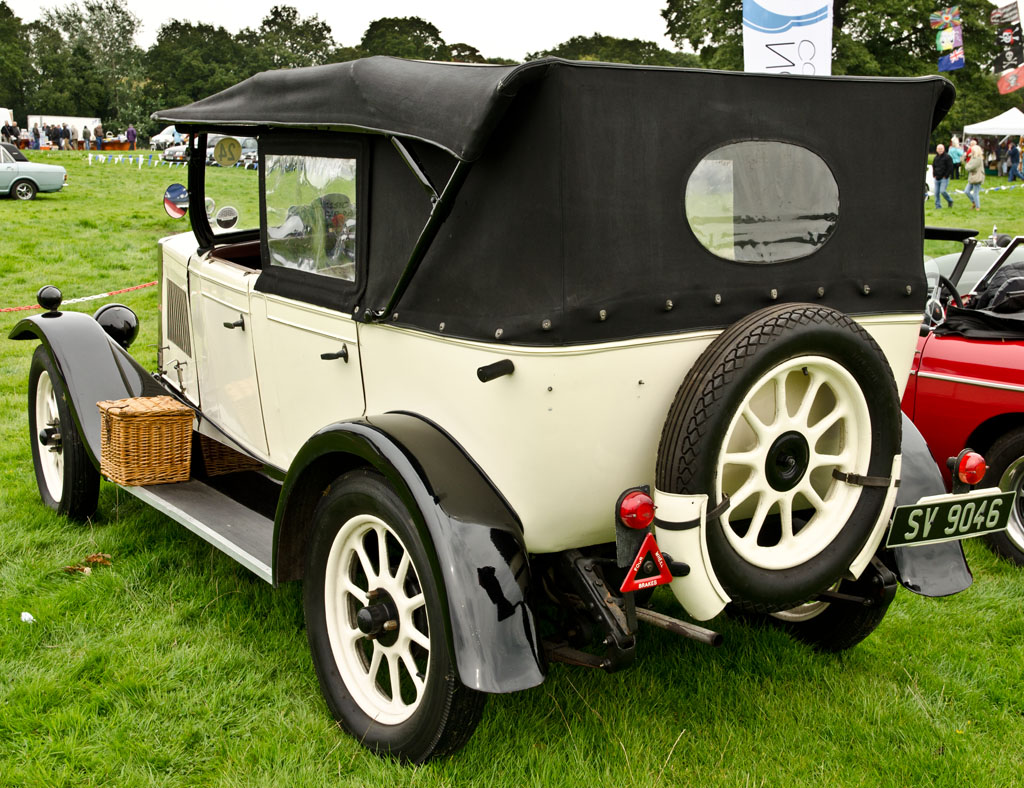
rear view

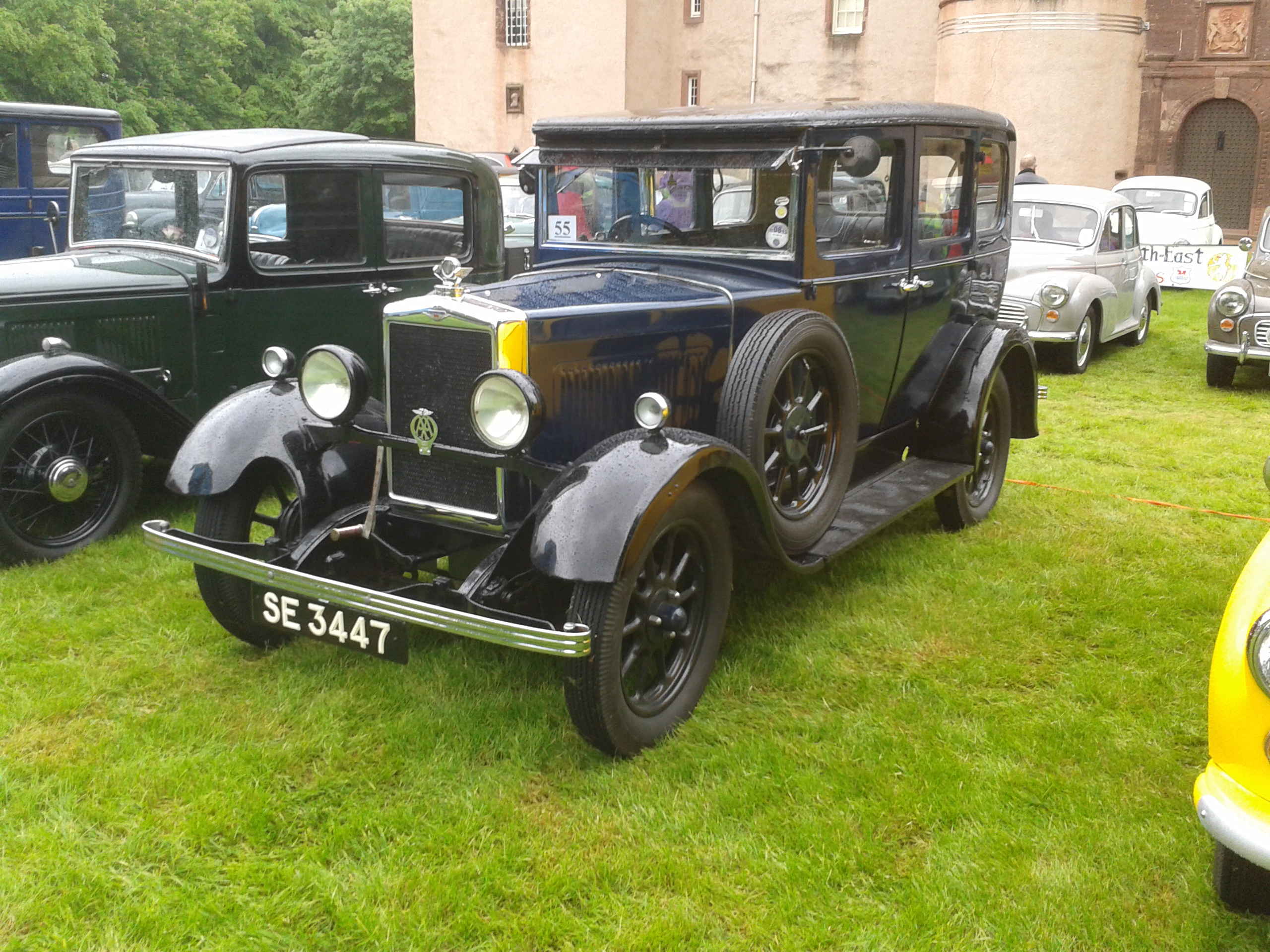
4-dr 6-light saloon 1930

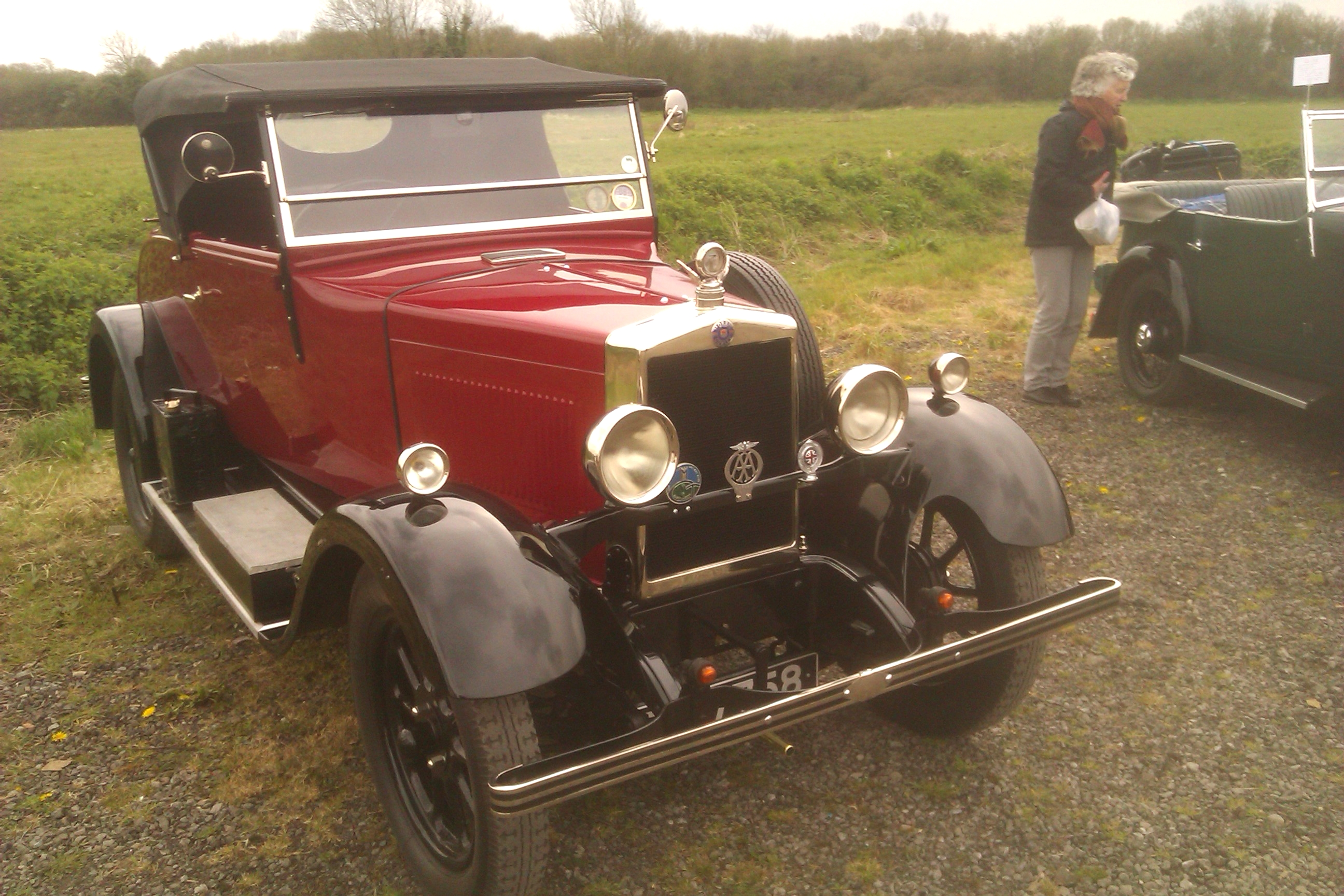
Two-seater tourer 1929

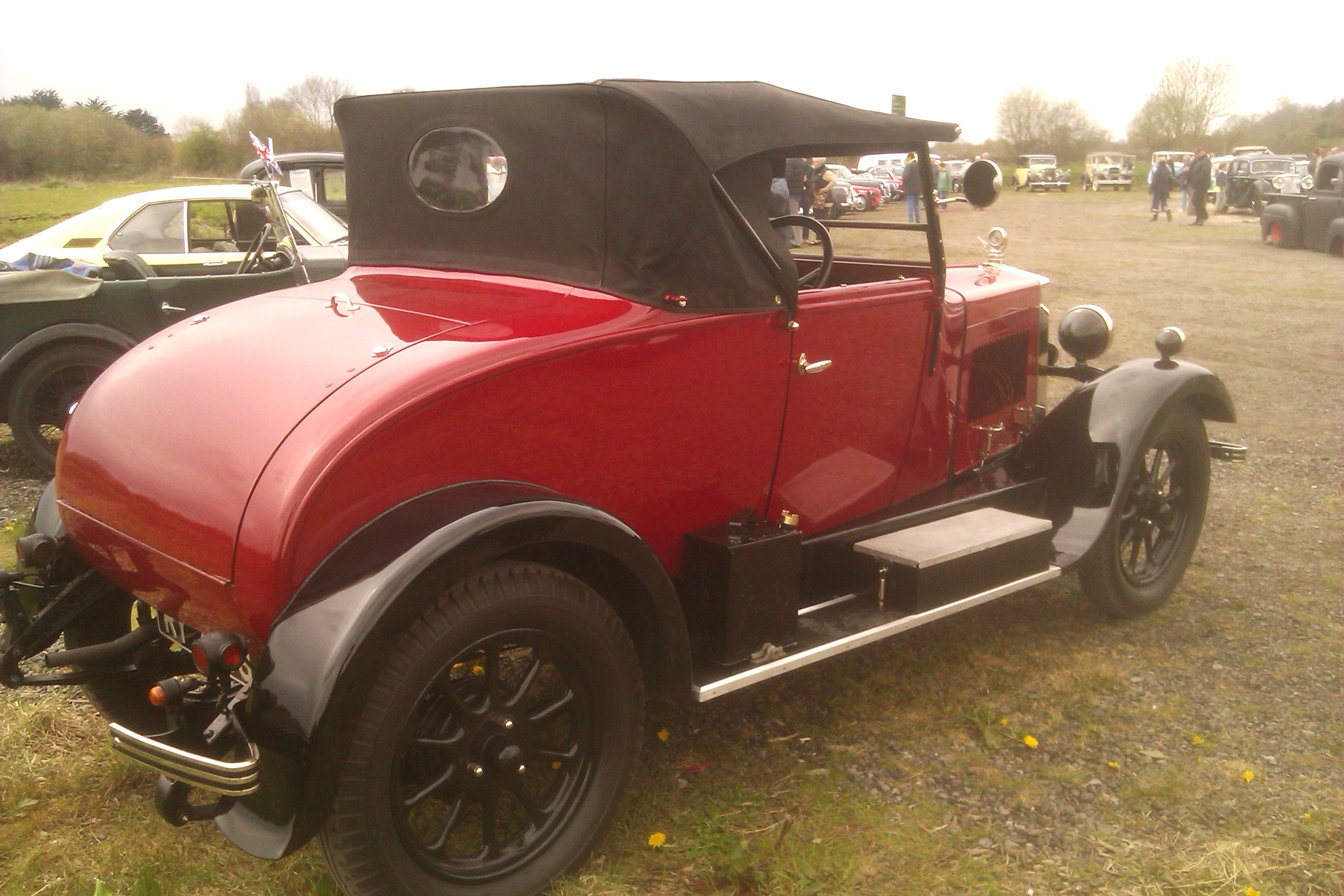
rear view

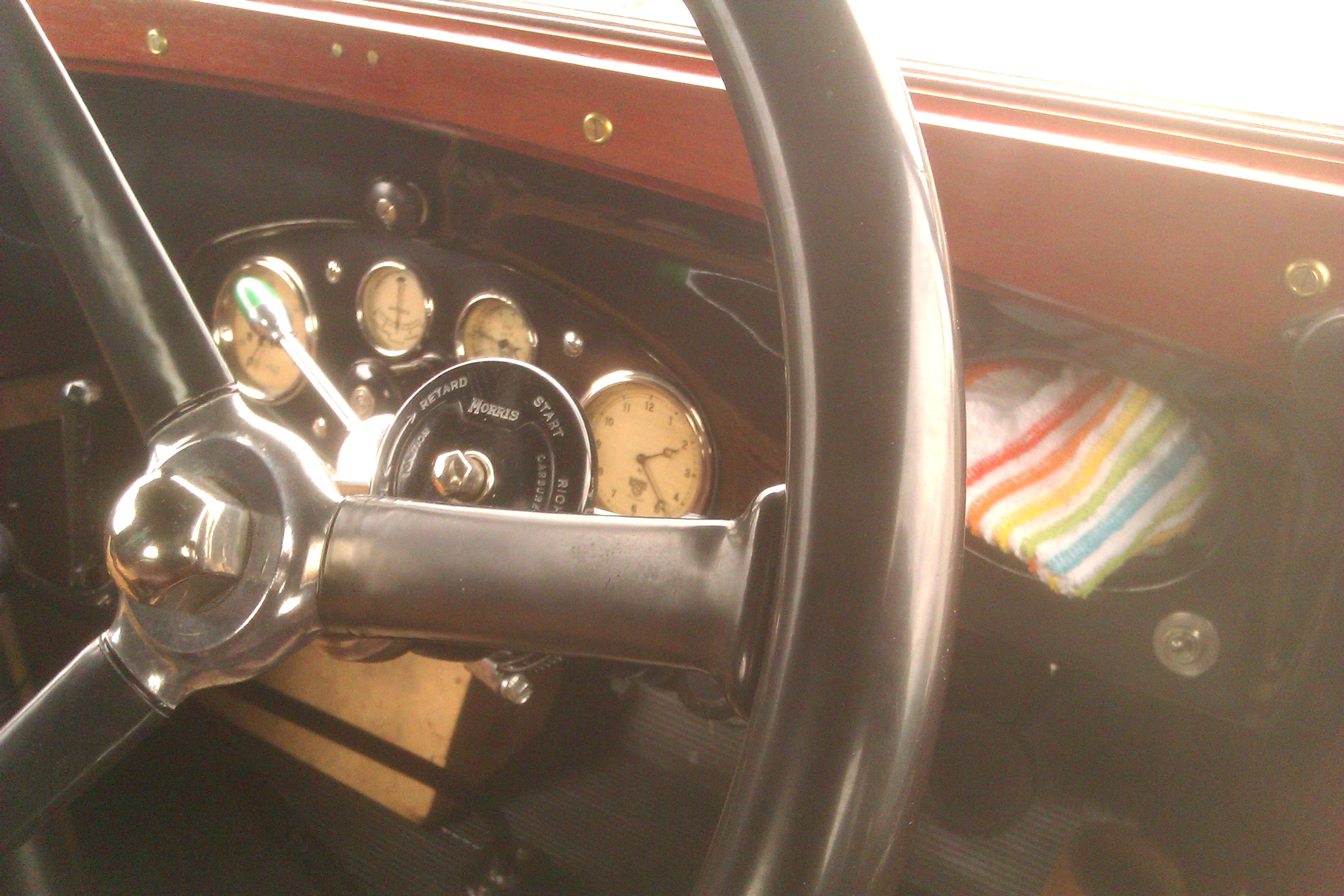
Instruments and controls

== Morris Cowley (1931–1935) ==
Morris Cowley
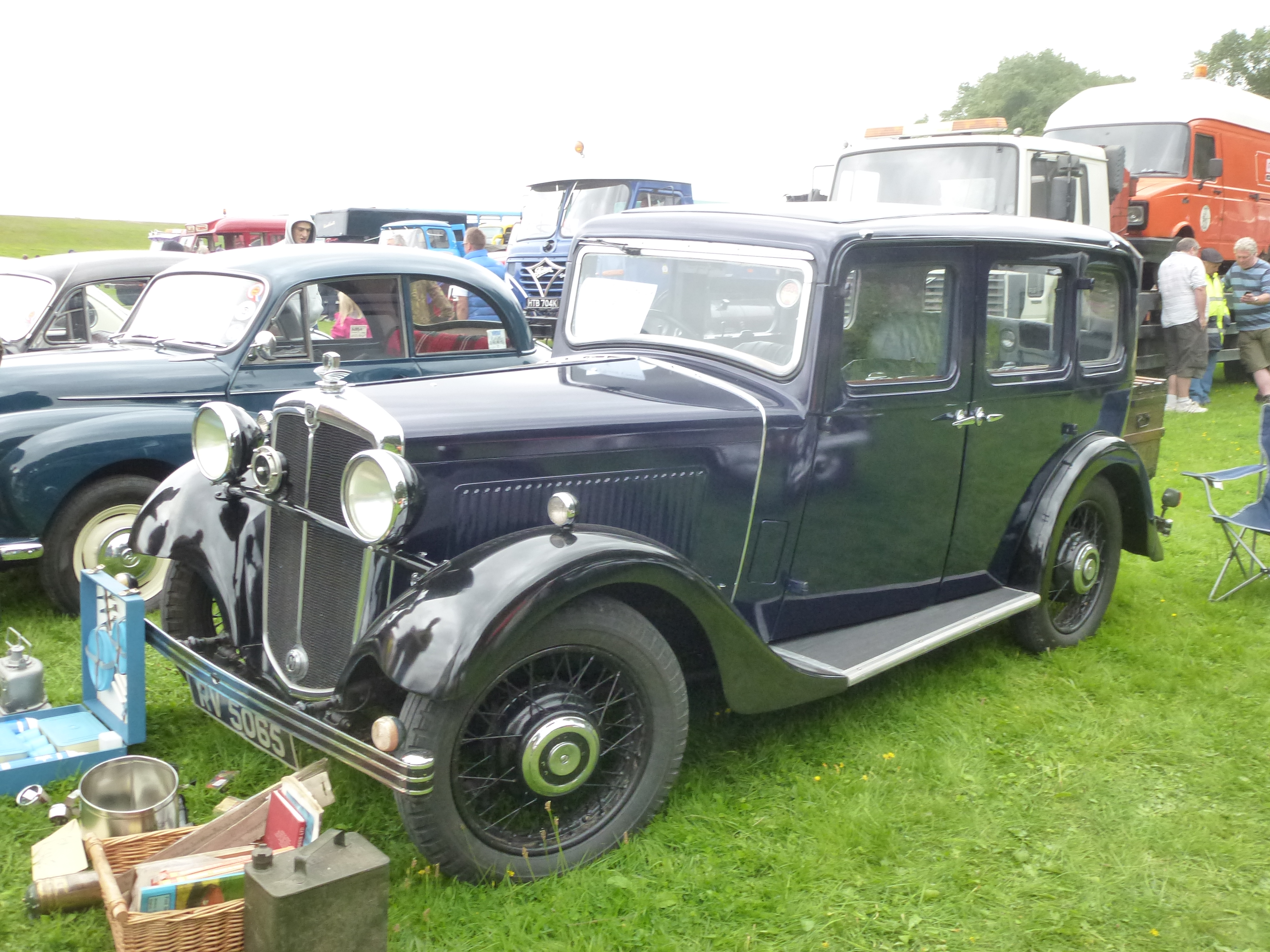
- 1933-34 model Four-door six-light 11.9 hp saloon first registered 16 May 1934

Overview
- Manufacturer: Morris
- Production: 1931–1935; 39,074 made.

Body and chassis
- Body style: 4-door saloon fixed or sliding head (sun roof); two seater; 2-door Special coupé; Traveller's saloon —5th rear door; chassis only (for special bodies)
- Related: Morris Oxford and Morris Twelve

Powertrain
- Engine: 11.9 = 1548 cc or 14/32 = 1802 cc side-valve Straight-4

Dimensions
- Wheelbase: 105 inches (2667 mm)
- Length: 155 inches (3937 mm)
- Width: 60.5 inches (1537 mm)

Chronology
- Predecessor: Morris Cowley (1926–1931)
- Successor: Morris Twelve

A considerably changed Cowley was announced on 29 August 1931. In common with the rest of the Morris range the coachwork of the now six models of Cowley was redesigned for a more pleasing appearance – with a fashionable "eddy-free" leading edge to the roof of closed cars, petrol tanks located at the rear of the chassis, chrome finish to all bright parts, and Magna-type wire wheels as standard. There was a new chassis frame giving a lower body. Springs had been made longer and more resilient. Bigger brake drums were provided, and the brakes were now actuated hydraulically and supplied by Lockheed. There was a new radiator to match with the large hub wire wheels. The engine's connecting rods were now Duralumin. A sports coupé body was added to the range. Either the 11.9 or 14/32 engine was supplied to order for the same price. There were no more four-seater tourers.

=== Revised ===
A revised ("transformed" said the advertising) lower body with a new 11.9 hp engine behind a new, sloping, radiator and still of the same 1548 cc was announced 28 August 1933 along with a four-speed Twin-Top synchromesh gearbox, shorter stronger cruciform chassis, leather upholstery, draught excluders over the gear lever and pedal slots and a battery master switch (in case of fire). Closed cars were given a sun visor. Additional equipment included bumpers front and rear and luggage grid and parcel net

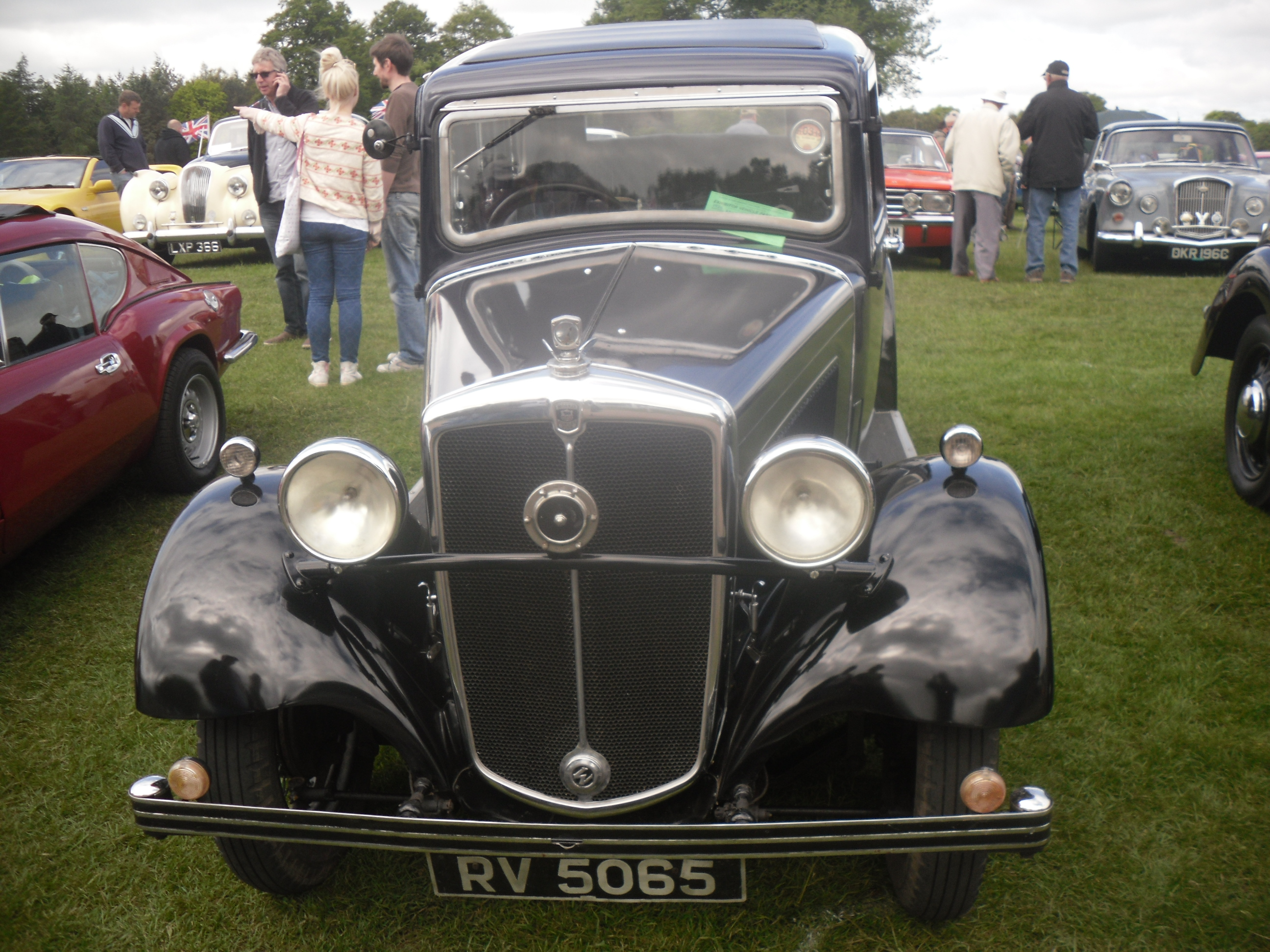
The new radiator for the new engine

=== Morris Twelve ===
From late 1934 this car was badged Morris Twelve Four.

== Morris Cowley Six ==
Morris Cowley Six
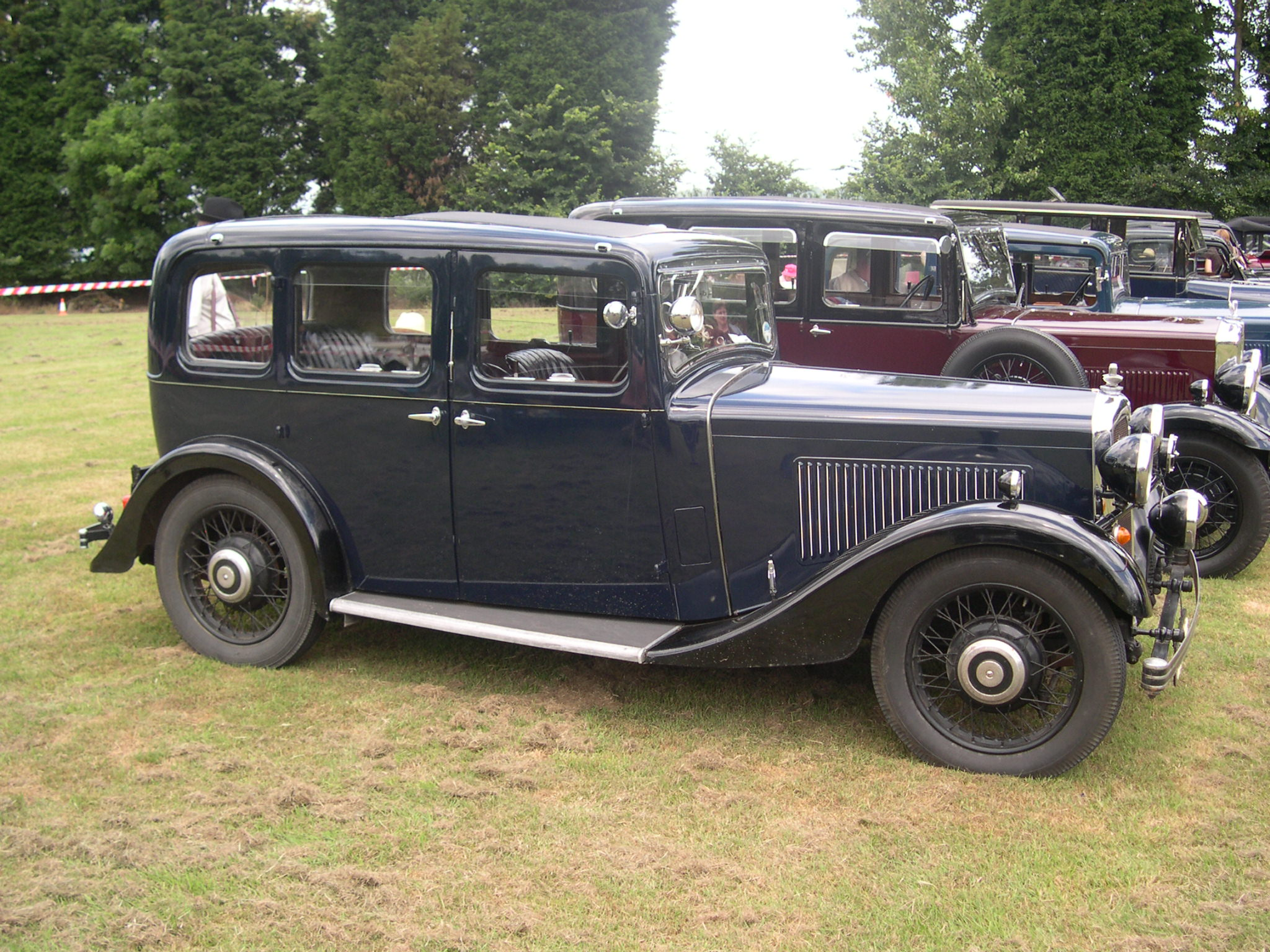
- Morris Cowley Six six-light saloon 1934

Overview
- Manufacturer: Morris
- Production: 1934–1935; 15,470 made.

Body and chassis
- Body style: 4-door saloon, 2 door coupé.
- Related: Morris Oxford Six

Powertrain
- Engine: 63.5 x 102mm (same as Ten-Four); 1938 cc side-valve Straight-6; 15 hp 36 bhp at 3,400 rpm

Dimensions
- Wheelbase: 106 inches (2692mm)
- Width: 65.5 inches (1664 mm)

Chronology
- Predecessor: Morris Major
- Successor: Morris Fifteen-Six

Announced 28 August 1933 the 1934 Cowley Six replaced the Morris Major keeping the same 1938 cc six cylinder, side valve engine but with a new lower chassis. Along with all other Morris cars the Cowley now has a synchromesh four-speed gearbox, dipping headlights, hydraulic shock absorbers, leather upholstery, hydraulic brakes, rear petrol tank, direction indicators, safety glass, battery master switches and automatic ignition. There was a matching smaller 12 hp 1378 cc Morris Ten Six.

Prices:

- Saloon £215 or £220 fixed or sliding head
- Special coupé £265

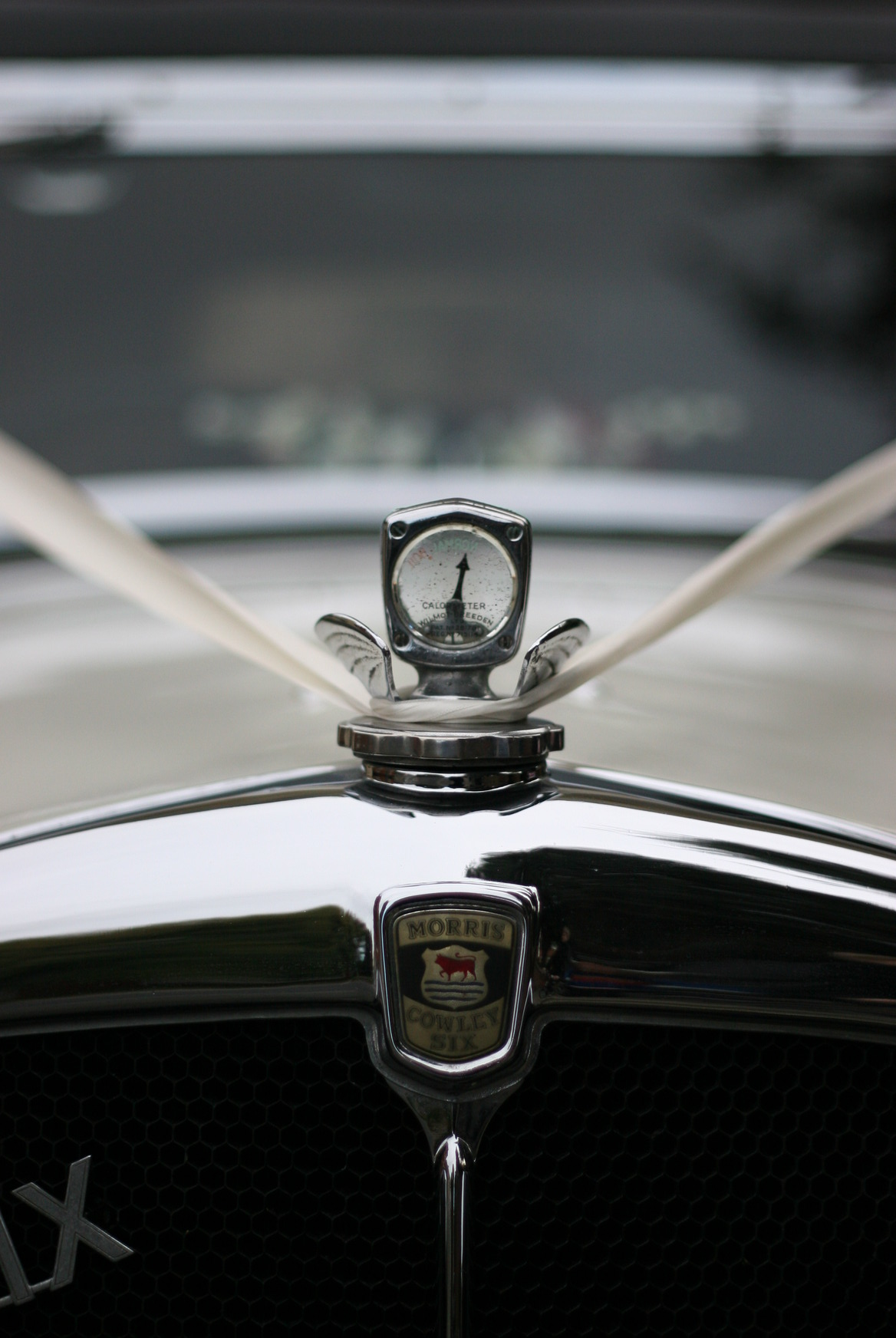
Badge

The Cowley Six became the Fifteen-Six in 1935.

== Morris Cowley MCV (1950–1956) ==
Morris Cowley MCV
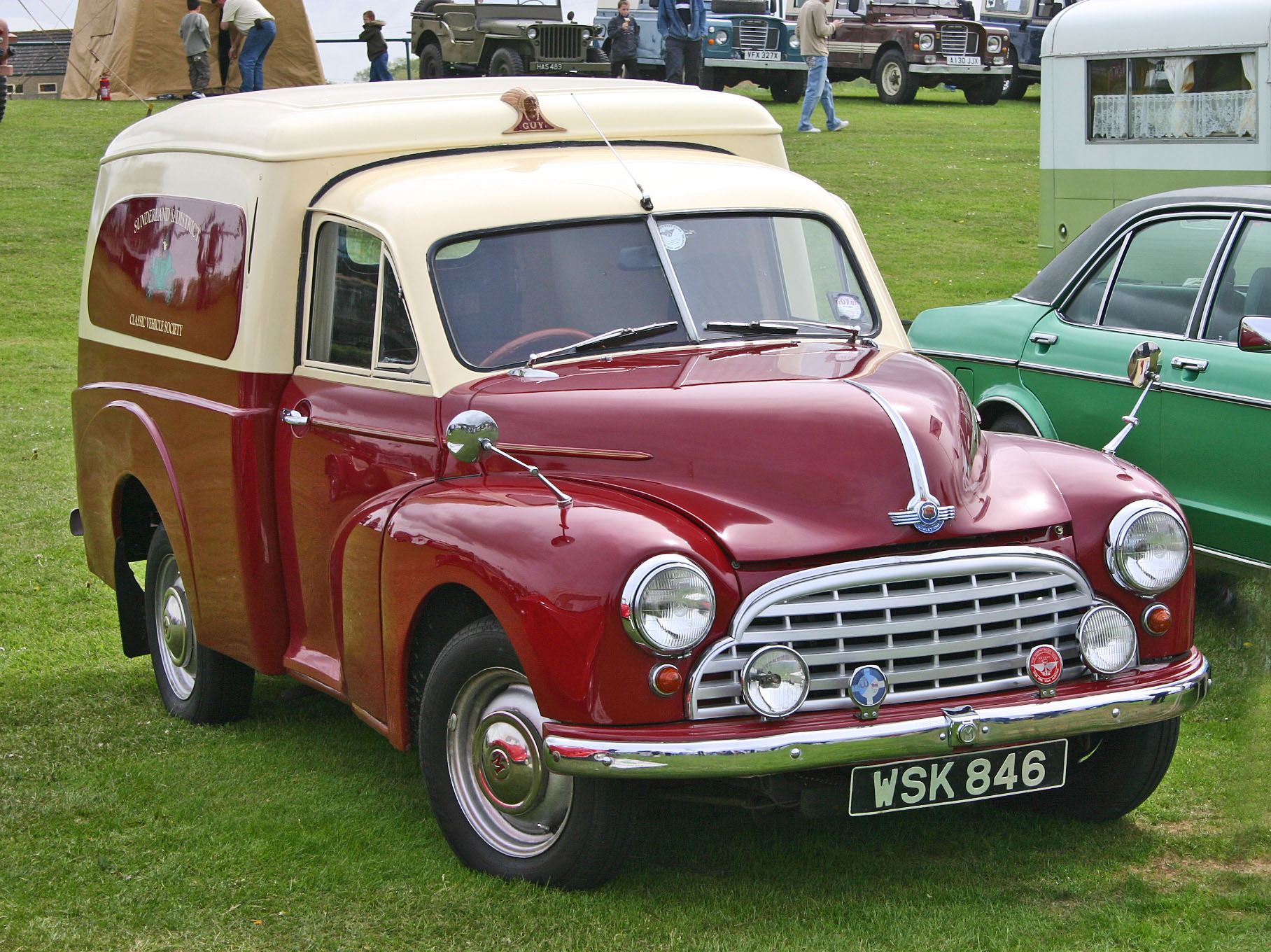

Overview
- Manufacturer: Morris/BMC
- Also called: Morris ½ Ton Coupe Utility (Australia)
- Production: 1950–1956
- Assembly: United Kingdom; Australia

Body and chassis
- Body style: 2-door van 2-door pick-up 2-door chassis-cab
- Related: Morris Oxford MO

Chronology
- Successor: ½-ton Series III

Introduced in 1950, the Cowley MCV commercial vehicle range was based on the Morris Oxford MO. It was offered in van, pick-up and chassis-cab versions. The 10cwt MCV van was a replacement for the Morris Y-series van and had a capacity of 120 cu ft (3,400 L) or 138 cu ft (3,900 L) without the passenger seat.

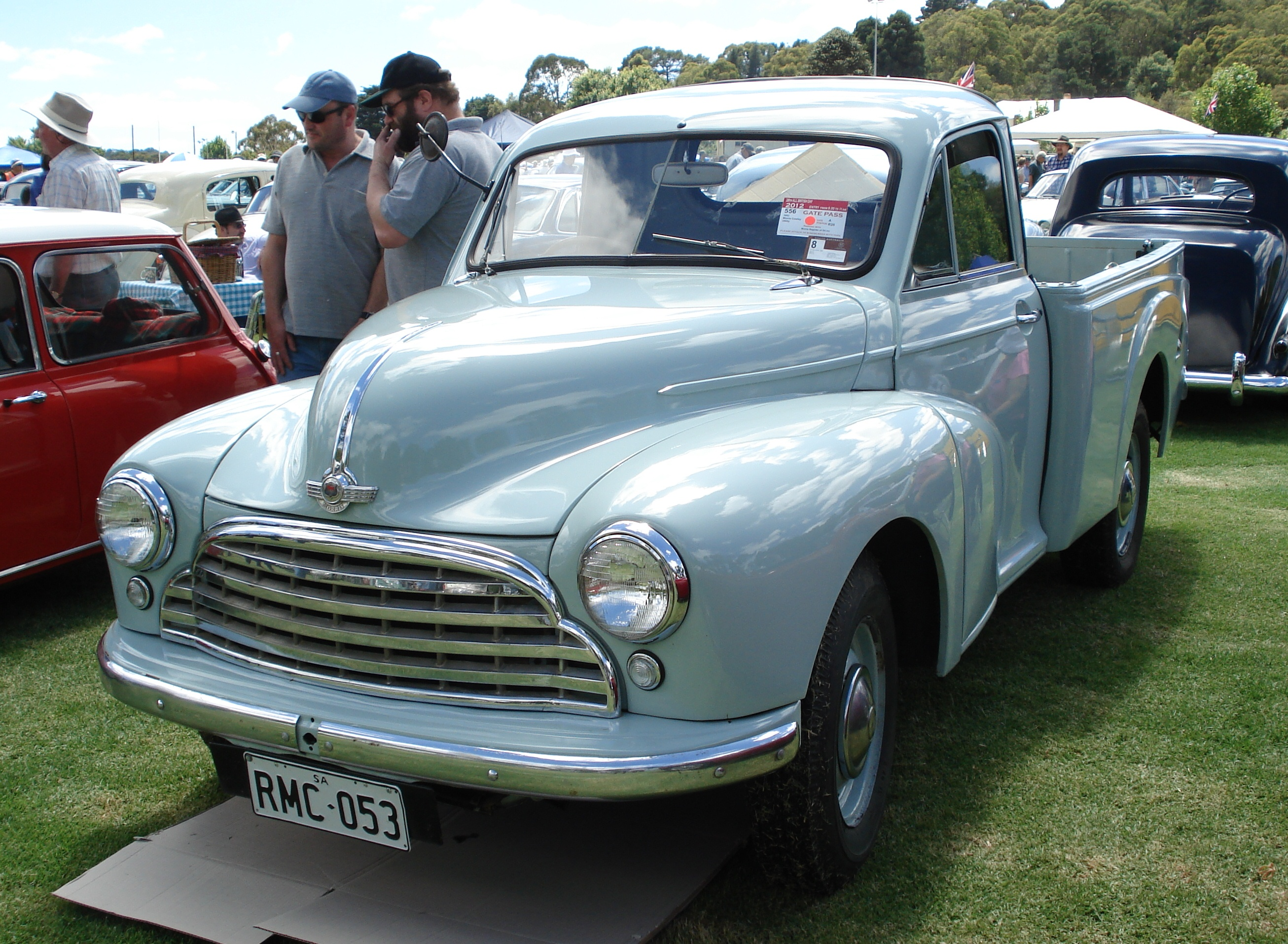
1953 Morris Cowley MCV pick-up, pictured in Australia, where it was marketed as the Morris ½ Ton Coupe Utility

== 1954 Morris Cowley ==
Morris Cowley

Overview
- Manufacturer: Morris/BMC
- Production: 1954–1959

Body and chassis
- Class: midsize car
- Body style: 4-door saloon
- Related: Morris Oxford Series III

Dimensions
- Wheelbase: 97 in (2,464 mm)
- Length: 169 in (4,293 mm)
- Width: 65 in (1,651 mm)
- Height: 63 in (1,600 mm)
- Kerb weight: 2352 pounds

Chronology
- Predecessor: Morris Twelve
- Successor: Morris 1800

The 1954 Morris Cowley was a four-cylinder midsize car produced from 1954 to 1959. It was essentially a budget version of the Morris Oxford Series III with less chrome, no heater, fixed front quarter lights and a simplified dashboard.

=== Morris Cowley 1200 ===
Morris Cowley 1200
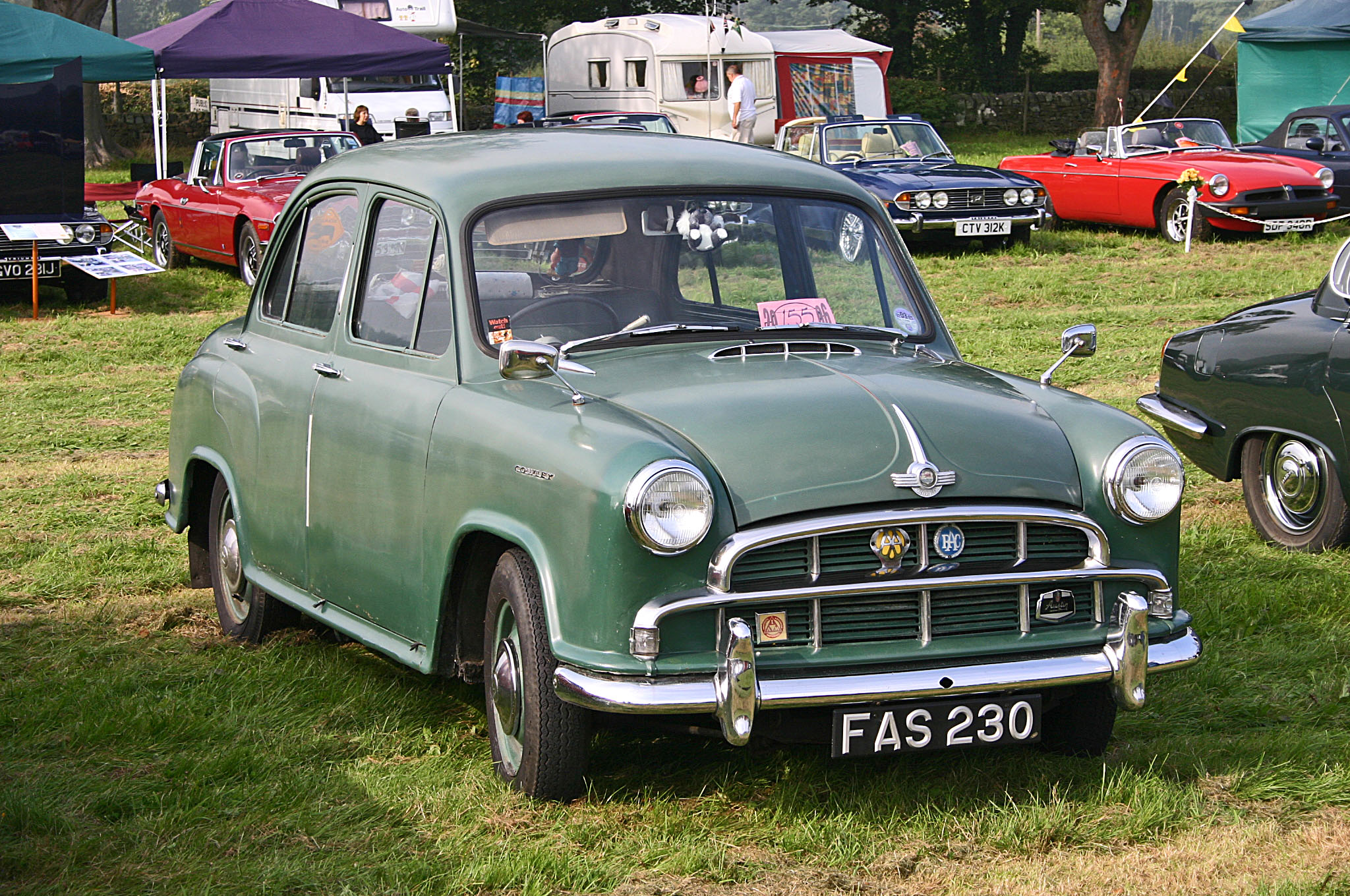

Overview
- Production: 1954–1956; 17,413 produced

Body and chassis
- Related: Morris Oxford Series II

Powertrain
- Engine: 1.2 L B-Series Straight-4 ohv

This new Morris Cowley was launched on 14 July 1954 as a smaller engined more simply furnished supplement to the Morris Oxford Series II launched two months earlier. The engine, the 1.2 L (1200 cc) B-Series unit was a new design also used in the Austin A40 and Nash Metropolitan. Its power output was 42 bhp at 4,500 rpm.

The monocoque body shell was that of the four door Morris Oxford Series II, the Cowley also sharing its torsion bar front suspension and live rear axle but with smaller 8 in (203 mm) brake drums on early models. Some of the Oxford's exterior chrome has been removed to simplify the appearance and some has been replaced with stainless steel. Plastic-covered felt has been used in place of interior carpet. Quarter lights are fixed on the Cowley though the main windows wind down in the usual way. Steering was of the conventional rack and pinion type. The car had a top speed of just over 70 miles per hour (110 km/h).

The British Motor magazine tested a Cowley saloon in 1955 recording a top speed of 71.9 mph (115.7 km/h) and acceleration from 0–60 mph (97 km/h) in 31.5 seconds and a fuel consumption of 28.0 miles per imperial gallon (10.1 L/100 km; 23.3 mpg_{‑US}). The test car cost £702 including taxes.

=== Morris Cowley 1500 ===
Morris Cowley 1500

Overview
- Production: 1956–1958; 4623 produced

Body and chassis
- Related: Morris Oxford Series III

Powertrain
- Engine: 1.5 L B-Series Straight-4

On 12 October 1956 it was announced that the 1200 engine had been replaced by the Oxford's larger 1.5 L (1489 cc) engine and the exterior styling amended in line with the Morris Oxford Series III.

== ½-ton series III ==
Morris ½-ton Series III
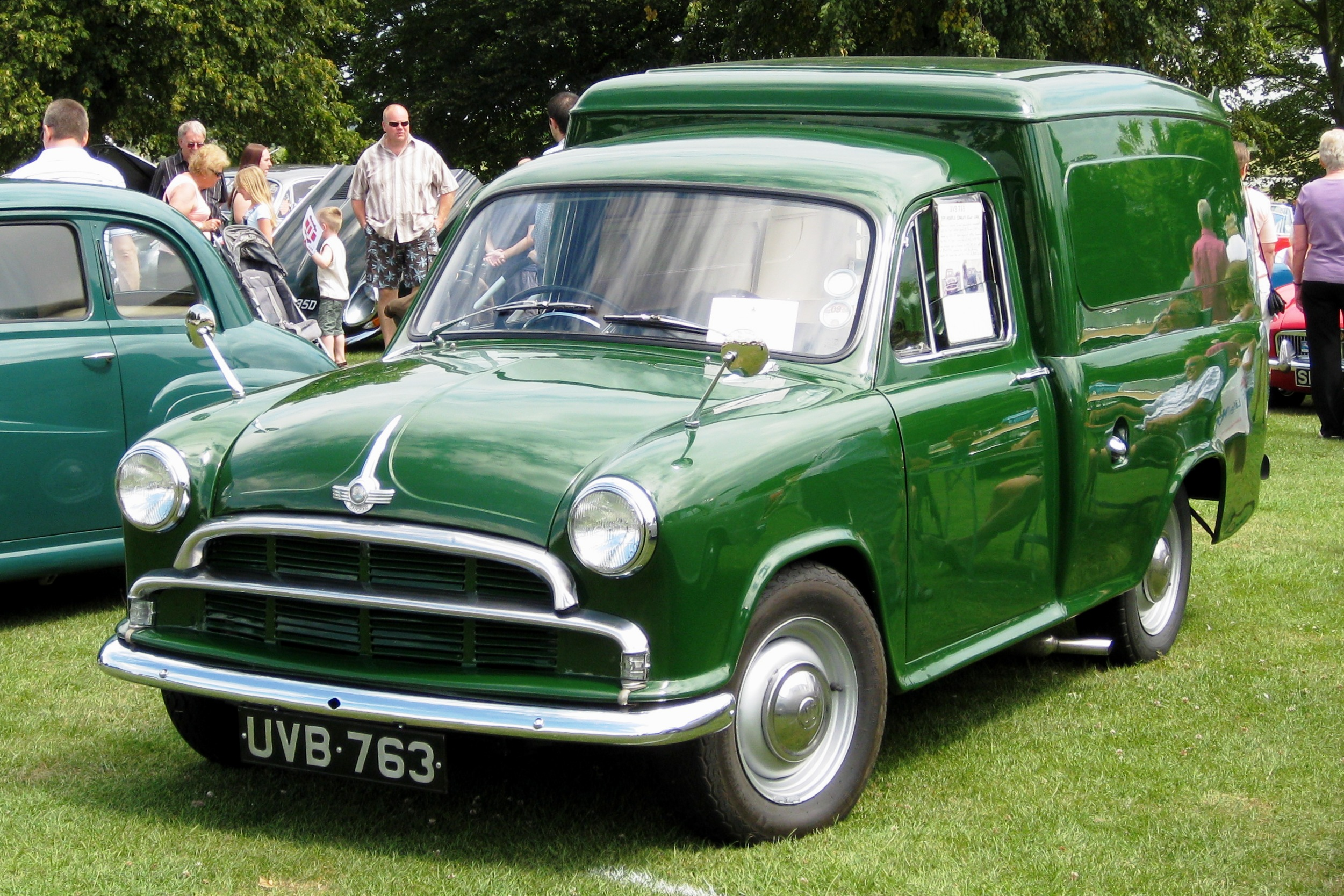
- ½-ton Series III Van 1959

Overview
- Manufacturer: British Motor Corporation
- Production: 1956–1962
- Assembly: United Kingdom

Body and chassis
- Body style: 2-door van 2-door pick-up 2-door chassis-cab
- Layout: FR layout

Chronology
- Predecessor: Morris Cowley MCV

The Morris ½-ton Series III was a commercial vehicle variant of the Morris Oxford Series III. It was introduced in 1956, replacing the Morris Cowley MCV and was offered in van, pick-up and chassis-cab body styles. The Series III was replaced by a Morris version of the Austin A55 van in 1962. The commercials never had the Series III bonnet and headlamp cowls. Again the Cowley name never appeared on the vehicles and it is very likely that no more left the factory after 1960.

== See also ==
- Morris and Cowley, a comedy double act who took their name from the car
- The Professionals (TV series), in Season 5 Episode 10, we find out the nickname for George Cowley is Morris, based on this car.
