= Pantin (surname) =

Pantin is a surname. Notable people with the surname include:

- Carl Pantin (1899–1967), British zoologist
- Dorothy Pantin (1896–1985), doctor and surgeon
- Raoul Pantin (1943–2015), Trinidadian journalist, editor, poet, and playwright
- William Abel Pantin (1902–1973), English historian
- Yolanda Pantin (born 1954), Venezuelan poet and children's writer
