= John Lush (priest) =

Archdeacon of Southland from 1933 to 1962

John Arthur Lush (11 November 1881 – 8 September 1964) was Archdeacon of Southland from 1933 until 1962.

Lush was educated at Selwyn College, Cambridge and ordained deacon in 1906 and priest in 1907. After curacies in West Hartlepool and Bishopwearmouth he was a Chaplain to the New Zealand Armed Forces from 1916 to 1918. He was Vicar of Havelock from 1911 to 1921 and then of St John, Invercargill until his appointment as Archdeacon.
