= Lionel Denny =

British produce broker and Lord Mayor of London

Sir Lionel Denny GBE MC KStJ JP DL

Lord Mayor of London
- In office 1965–1966

Personal details
- Born: Jonathan Lionel Percy Denny; 5 August 1897
- Died: 5 August 1985 (aged 88)

Sir Jonathan Lionel Percy Denny (5 August 1897 – 5 August 1985) was a British produce broker. He was Lord Mayor of London from 1965 to 1966.
