= Irene Caroline Diner Koenigsberger =

American chemist

Irene Caroline Diner Koenigsberger (September 21, 1896 – August 18, 1985) was an American chemist known for discovering a method for determining the lifespan of rubber products.

== Early life and education ==
Koenigsberger was born in New York City, the daughter of Dr. Jacob Diner and Jeaneatte (née Dëlowe) Diner. Her father, who was born in Russia with Jewish ancestry, founded and was the first dean of Fordham University's College of Pharmacy. She had one brother, Milton, who became a New York City businessman.

Koenigsberger was educated at Hunter College, from which she earned her bachelor's degree in 1917. She continued on to earn her master's degree from Columbia University in 1918, and a doctorate in chemistry from New York University in 1921.

In the course of her doctoral research into the molecular structure of rubber, Koenigsberger discovered a way to discern the lifespan of rubber products, particularly rubber tires. Despite pressure from tire and automobile manufacturers for exclusive access, she declined to patent her discovery and chose instead to make the information publicly available.

== Career ==
After earning her doctorate, Koenigsberger worked for the United States Army's Chemical Warfare Service as an associate chemist. In the 1930s, she was hired by the National Voice Amplifying Company as chief chemist, and went on to work for the United States War Department during World War II.

Koenigsberger held membership with the American Chemical Society, and was a Fellow of the American Institute of Chemists.

== Personal life ==
Koenigsberger married Lawrence Koenigsberger, a lawyer, in 1922, and eventually settled in Washington, D.C.

She was a founding member and honorary vice president of Temple Sinai Washington. She was also a founder and the first president of her local chapter of B'nai B'rith Women (now Jewish Women International) and started George Washington University Hillel. She was also one of the founders of the Jewish Community Council of Greater Washington.

Koenigsberger was the 1980 recipient of the Hunter College Distinguished Alumna Medal.
