= Nakaakira Tsukahara =

Japanese doctor and neurologist

Nakaaki Tsukahara
- 塚原仲晃
- Born: November 11, 1933; Kyoto, Kyoto Prefecture, Japan
- Died: August 12, 1985 (aged 51); Japan Air Lines Flight 123, Mount Takamagahara, Ueno, Tano District, Gunma Prefecture, Japan
- Citizenship: Japanese
- Education: University of Tokyo Faculty of Medicine
- Scientific career
- Fields: Cerebral physiology
- Workplaces: Osaka University

Nakaakira Tsukahara (November 11, 1933 - August 12, 1985) was a Japanese doctor, cerebral physiologist, and neurologist who served as professor at the Faculty of Engineering Science at Osaka University.

== Legacy ==
The Nakaaki Tsukahara Memorial Award was established by the Brain Science Promotion Foundation to commemorate Tsukahara's research achievements.

== Bibliography ==
- 脳の可塑性と記憶 [Brain plasticity and memory] (in Japanese). Books Kinokuniya. 1987. ISBN 4314004916. (Republished in Iwanami Gendai Bunko.)
