= Jack Dootson =

American politician

Member of the Washington House of Representatives for the 38th district
- In office 1941–1943; 1951–1953; 1963–1967

Personal details
- Born: June 11, 1914 Pasadena, California, United States
- Died: August 1, 1985 (aged 71)
- Party: Democratic

John Todd Dootson (June 11, 1914 – August 1, 1985) was an American politician in the state of Washington. He served in the Washington House of Representatives for the 38th district.
