= Johann Kurz =

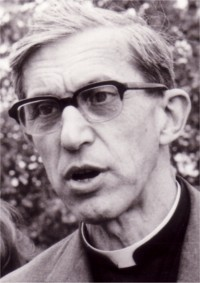
Johann Kurz

Johann Kurz (20 October 1913 in Wetzleinsdorf, Niederösterreich – 6 August 1985 in Vienna) was a Roman Catholic Presbyter and longtime schoolmaster of the Archbishop seminary Hollabrunn (junior seminary).

== Life ==
After attending the Stiftsgymnasium Seitenstetten and studying at the University of Vienna he became a priest on 11 July 1937. A two-year period followed where he was chaplain of Poysdorf and prefect at Viennas seminary. 1943 he joined the Oratorium Sanctissimae Trinitatis founded by Friedrich Wessely.

From 1 July 1945 he was spiritual guide, from 8 October 1946 deputy schoolmaster at the Archbishop seminary Hollabrunn. Together with Hans Hermann Groër he founded 1974 Aufbaugymnasium Hollabrunn. From 1984 on he was the spiritual guide of the religious order of the Sisters of Mercy in Vienna-Gumpendorf and vice president of the Canisiuswerk, an Austrian catholic institution.

He is buried in the priest's cemetery at Großrußbach cemetery.

== Family ==
Johann Kurz was granduncle of Sebastian Kurz.

== Compositions ==
- Die Lehre von der Betrachtung im ausgehenden Mittelalter. Dissertation, University of Vienna 1940.
- Hundert Jahre eb. Seminar in Hollabrunn. Hollabrunn 1981.

== Bibliography ==
- Hans Groër: Hundert Jahre Knabenseminar der Erzdiözese Wien. Hollabrunn 1956.
- Peter Paul Kaspar: Knabenseminar : ein Nachruf. Müller, Salzburg/Wien 1997, ISBN 3-7013-0943-4.
- Christine Mann, Erwin Mann: Die große Geschichte des Kleinen Seminars der Erzdiözese Wien. Wiener Domverlag, Wien 2006, ISBN 3-85351-194-5.
