= Josef Fath =

German footballer

Personal information
- Date of birth: 27 December 1911
- Date of death: 13 August 1985 (aged 73)
- Position: Left wing

Senior career*
Years	Team	Apps	(Gls)
1932–1949	Wormatia Worms		

International career
1934–1938	Germany	13	(7)
- * Club domestic league appearances and goals

Josef Fath (27 December 1911 – 13 August 1985) was a German footballer.

The forward won 13 caps for the Germany national team in which he scored 7 goals.
