= Morris and Cowley =

English variety show comedians

Morris and Cowley were English variety show comedians, popular as a double act in the 1930s and 1940s. They were brothers, Harry Birkenhead (George Harold Birkenhead; 26 December 1895 – 29 September 1972) and Frank Birkenhead (3 February 1898 – 11 August 1985).

== Biography ==
The brothers were both born in Darlaston, near Walsall, Staffordshire. They first performed with another brother, their mother, and two girls, at the Palace Theatre, Oldbury, in 1911. They toured as 'The Birkenhead Family' until 1914, when all three brothers joined the army.

After the war, Harry and Frank Birkenhead formed a double act, initially as 'The Vesta Brothers'. They changed their stage name to 'Morris and Cowley' in 1923, after the car of that name. Described as "brilliant young comedians" when touring Australia in 1926, they became popular variety performers, and toured in Britain alongside ventriloquist Johnson Clark with their own show, The Squire's Party. From the late 1930s, through and after the Second World War, they appeared regularly on BBC Radio on programmes such as The Happidrome and Palace of Varieties. As part of their act, they appeared as ancient Chelsea Pensioners, reminiscing about their old days in the Boer War.

They retired around 1960. Harry Birkenhead ("Morris") died in Camberwell, London, in 1972, aged 76, and Frank Birkenhead ("Cowley") died at Brinsworth House, Twickenham, in 1985 at the age of 87.
