= Edward McClaren =

American physician

- Born: July 2, 1902; Abbeville County, South Carolina, US
- Died: August 1, 1985 (aged 83); Greenville County, South Carolina, US
- Education: Howard University
- Occupation: Physician

Edward McClaren (July 2, 1902 – August 1, 1985) was an American physician in South Carolina. McClaren is best known for founding a hospital to treat African-American patients during the late Jim Crow Era. The building that housed the hospital is now slated for preservation, and McClaren's name will adorn a new development.

== Biography ==
McClaren graduated from Howard University Medical School in 1935 and practiced medicine in Greenville, South Carolina. In the midst of the Jim Crow Era, McClaren spent $400 to purchase a property next to his home on Wardlaw Street, additionally investing $15,000 to create a hospital to treat African-American patients. The McClaren Medical Shelter opened in 1948 and was a two-story, 3,000 square foot facility with 9 patient rooms and one operating room. The facility was built fireproof, after a nearby Black hospital was torn down as a fire hazard.

McClaren was one of only three black doctors in the area in 1950, but he would go on to staff fourteen white doctors and eight black doctors at his hospital, in addition to three black nurses. More than 200 babies were delivered at McClaren Medical Shelter, and the staff performed nearly 200 operations. Eventually 1,072 black patients received treatment at the hospital that they were not able to receive from local white facilities.

The hospital closed in 1954 after area hospitals were desegregated. McClaren issued a statement describing that there was no longer a need for a private clinic for African American patients, as African American physicians were able to treat their patients at Greenville General Hospital. Local Greenville County schools would stay segregated until a court ordered them integrated in 1970.

The building was later used as a massage parlor and art studio, and slated to be partially demolished to make room for a mixed use development until the owner became aware of its significance after the city targeted the building for preservation as it was not included in the National Register of Historic Places. McClaren's name will be used for the development, a 10-story, $55 million complex. The hospital building was relocated starting June 2020 over the course of several weeks to a location closer to a nearby intersection, to make room for the foundation for the development. There are designs for the hospital to be repurposed into a cultural center. As gentrification is a growing issue in Greenville, the McClaren development aims to set aside a portion of the new units for affordable housings, targeting households earning between $30,000 and $60,000.

McClaren's wife Mildred was a member of the YWCA and often hosted social functions at their home. According to his obituary, McClaren was a member of the Phi Beta Sigma fraternity, the AME Medical Society, and local and state medical associations.
