= Les Jago =

Australian rules footballer, born 1907

Personal information
- Full name: Les Jago
- Born: 10 December 1907
- Died: 8 August 1985 (aged 77)
- Original team: South Warrnambool
- Height: 178 cm (5 ft 10 in)
- Weight: 80 kg (176 lb)

Playing career^{1}
Years	Club	Games (Goals)
1933–34	St Kilda	17 (0)
- ^{1} Playing statistics correct to the end of 1934.

Les Jago (10 December 1907 – 8 August 1985) was an Australian rules footballer who played with St Kilda in the Victorian Football League (VFL).
