= Mauri Sariola =

Finnish writer

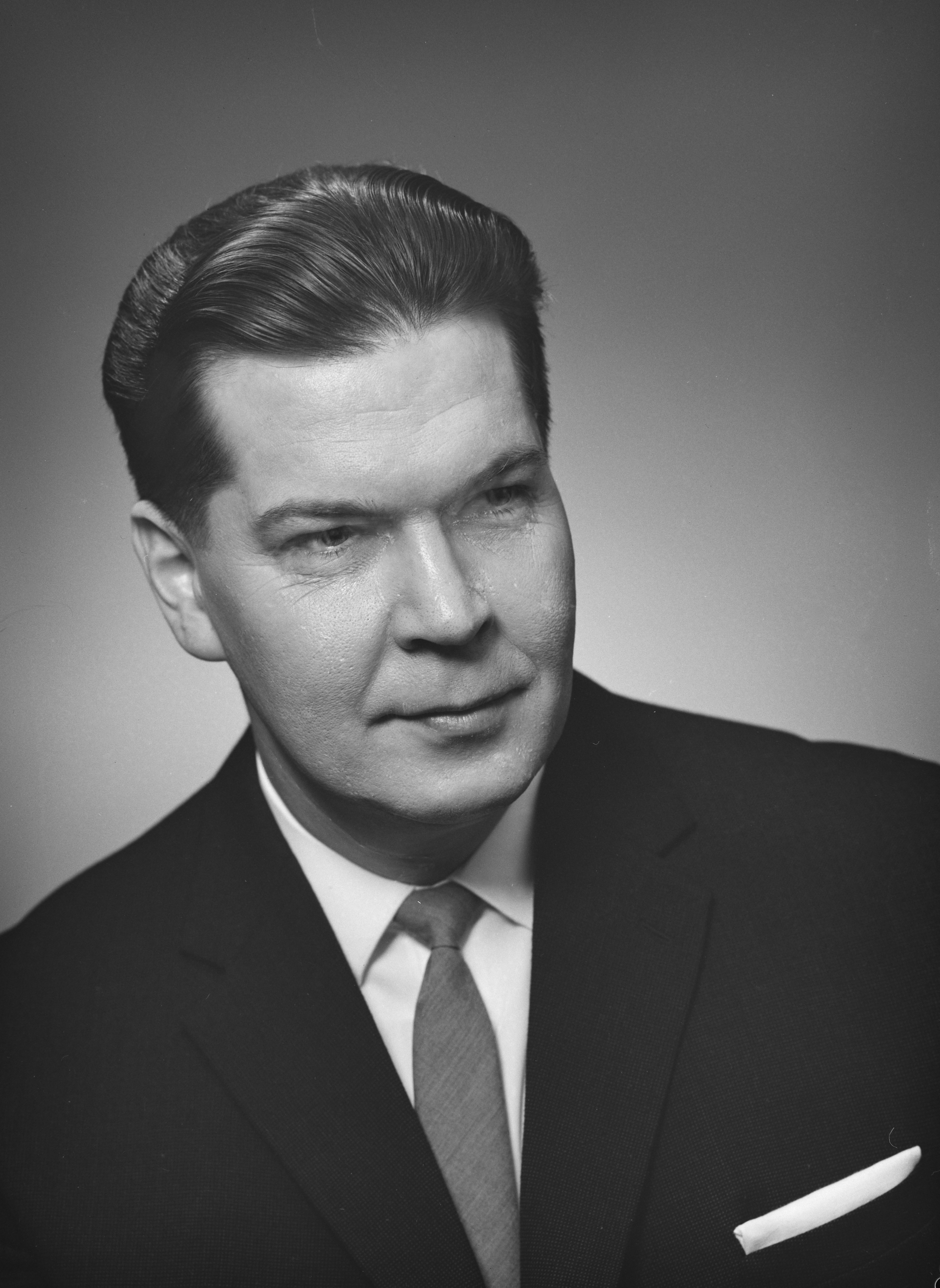
Mauri Sariola in 1963.

Mauri Aukusti Sariola (25 November 1924 – 9 August 1985) was a crime writer from Finland.

His books have been sold more than two million copies. They have been translated to more than 10 languages.

In addition to crime fiction, Sariola wrote war books and non-fiction.

== Biography ==
Mauri Sariola was born in Helsinki and he had spent his childhood in Hattula. He learned conservative values from his home. Sariola participated in the Continuation War as a radio officer, and got some combat experience in the Lapland War. After the war he studied law for some years in Helsinki University, but never graduated.

Sariola worked at a law firm, in a bank, as a primary school teacher and a journalist. He was a crime reporter at Helsingin Sanomat for ten years before becoming a freelance writer.

Sariola occupied a central place in the Finnish mystery scene for decades, and published more than 80 books.

Mauri Sariola died from complications after a gallstone operation in Helsinki on August 9, 1985.

== Writing ==
Sariola's best-known characters include Inspector Olavi Susikoski, the hero of more than 30 novels, and lawyer Matti Viima, the central character in five novels. First Susikoski books were published in 1956. After Sariola's death, his widow and fans have published more Susikoski books. Susikoski was based on a real-life policeman Martti Salander, whom Sariola had learned to know during his years as crime reporter.

Sariola had conservative values, and described eternal fight of the good and the evil. The criminals are nearly superhuman, and their motivation is explained to justify their needs. The murderers often kill for saving their honor. Women are described superficially, they are either decadent vamps or clean family girls.

Sariola was loved by his audience, but not so much by the critics. Some of his books were written very hastily.
