= Manuel Armanqué =

Spanish water polo player (1901–1985)

Personal information
- Full name: Manuel Armanqué Feliu
- Born: 14 February 1901; Barcelona, Spain
- Died: 14 August 1985 (aged 84); Geneva, Switzerland

Sport
- Sport: Water polo

Manuel Armanqué Feliu (Note: In this Spanish name, the first or paternal surname is Armanqué and the second or maternal family name is Feliu.) (14 February 1901 – 14 August 1985) was a Spanish water polo player. He competed in the men's tournament at the 1920 Summer Olympics.

He was later a biologist who wrote published articles in many journals.
