= Alphonse Leboulanger =

French cyclist

Personal information
- Born: 5 January 1906
- Died: 3 August 1985 (aged 79)

Cycling career
- Sport: Cycling
- Discipline: Road
- Role: Rider

Alphonse Leboulanger (5 January 1906 – 3 August 1985) was a French racing cyclist. He rode in the 1936 Tour de France.
