= Dorothy Pantin =

Doctor and surgeon

- Born: 28 June 1896; Douglas, Isle of Man
- Died: 6 August 1985 (aged 89); Isle of Man

Dorothy Pantin (28 June 1896 – 6 August 1985), was the first woman medical doctor and surgeon of the Isle of Man.

== Early life and education ==
Pantin was born in Douglas, Isle of Man to local doctor Charles Satchell Pantin, O.B.E in 1896. She was one of five children. Both she and one of her brothers, Charles Guy Pantin, became doctors. She attended St Paul's school and then Pantin gained her medical degree in the London school of medicine in 1920 and finishing in 1922.

== Career ==
She returned to the Isle of Man in 1923. Her main objective was to improve the medical care of children and mothers, becoming the island's leading obstetrician. She worked on the design of the new maternity building which opened in 1939. During her tenure on the island the maternal mortality rates dropped by more than half. She was the first medical supervisor of the Jane Crookall Maternity Home. She conducted the first blood transfusion, in 1926, and the third Caesarian section, in 1928 of the island's history. This was only the second to be successful.

Pantin worked as honorary surgeon to Noble's Hospital and Dispensary from 1926. She worked to ensure good diet for people struggling through the depression and to prevent rickets. When the orthopaedic ward was opened at Noble's Hospital in 1932 Pantin was there on a daily basis. She spent 11 years as the honorary secretary and treasurer of the Isle of Man branch of the British Medical Association and became its president in 1937. She died in August 1985 and was buried in the Douglas Borough Cemetery.

== Awards and honours ==
She is remembered by having one of the buildings on the island named after her and there is a plaque to her on the Jane Crookall maternity ward at Noble’s Hospital. She is also remembered by having been put on an Isle of Man stamp.
