= Marguerite Engler Schwarzman =

American educator

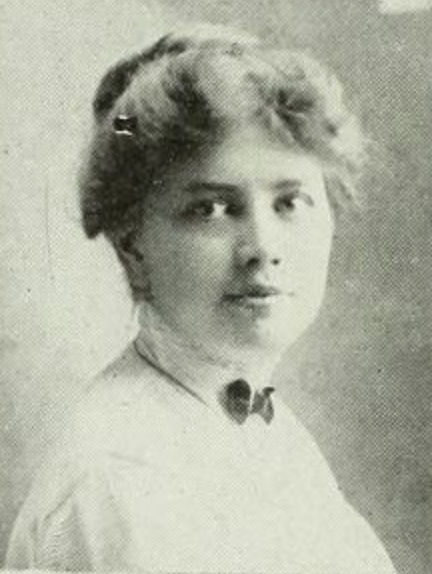
- Marguerite Engler, from the 1914 yearbook of Barnard College
- Born: Marguerite Louise Engler; January 31, 1892; New York City
- Died: August 29, 1985 (aged 93); San Diego, California
- Other name: Margaret Schwarzmann
- Occupations: Educator, librarian, writer, activist
- Notable work: Steel (1937)

Marguerite Louise Engler Schwarzman (January 31, 1892 – August 29, 1985) was an American educator, librarian, and writer. She founded a children's science museum, and was an activist on education, housing, and aging issues.

== Early life ==
Marguerite Louise Engler was born in New York City, the daughter of Swiss immigrants Charles Ulrich Engler and Marie Wyss Engler. Her father was a real estate developer. Her mother was a teacher, and her maternal grandfather was a professor at the University of Bern. She graduated from Barnard College in 1914, and earned a master's degree at Teachers College, Columbia University.

== Career ==
Schwarzman taught science at the Scarborough Day School in New York, and worked at the American Museum of Natural History before she married in 1918. In 1927 Schwarzman founded the Children's Laboratories, an experimental children's museum in a cottage in New Rochelle, New York. Among the exhibits were a live snake, a guinea pig, fossils, a microscope, and educational films. She wrote children's books including Steel (1937, illustrated by Th. D. Luykx), a picture book about the process of steel-making. She was also co-author of a paleontology textbook.

In the 1930s, Schwarzman served on the executive committee of the National Board of Review, was a member of the Westchester County Recreation Commission, and was president of the Barnard alumnae chapter in Westchester.

After her husband died in 1944, Schwarzman moved to California, where she worked as a librarian at San Diego State College, and as education director at a Unitarian church. She was founding director of the Liberal Religious Education Association. She was vice-president of the San Diego Citizens' Housing Council, and in that capacity testified at a congressional hearing on affordable housing and the Taft-Ellender-Wagner bill in 1948. In 1964 and 1965, she worked in Germany with the Unitarian Service Committee.

In 1976, as chair of the California Commission on Aging, Schwarzman was appointed by Governor Pat Brown to the 14th District Medical Quality Review Committee, overseeing San Diego and Imperial counties. In 1978, she testified again at a Congressional hearing, on California's Proposition 13.

== Personal life ==
Marguerite Engler married Swiss-born lawyer Jakob Anton "Jack" Schwarzmann in 1918. They had sons Robert and Richard. Richard, a history professor, died in 1977. Her husband died in 1944. She died in 1985, aged 93 years, in San Diego, California. A senior center in San Diego was named after Schwarzman, in tribute to her work on behalf of senior citizens. Beginning in 1986, the Area Agency on Aging's Marguerite Schwarzman Award was "given annually to a San Diegan making a significant volunteer contribution to the aging network".
