= Nelson B. Tinnin =

American politician

Member of the Missouri Senate from the 25th district
- In office January 3, 1973 – January 9, 1985
- Preceded by: J. F. "Pat" Patterson
- Succeeded by: Stephen R. Sharp

Member of the Missouri Senate from the 23rd district
- In office January 4, 1961 – January 3, 1973
- Preceded by: John W. Noble
- Succeeded by: Ralph Uthlaut Jr.

Personal details
- Born: October 8, 1905 Hornersville, Missouri
- Died: August 13, 1985 (aged 79) Memphis, Tennessee
- Party: Democratic

Nelson B. Tinnin (October 8, 1905 – August 13, 1985) was an American politician who served in the Missouri Senate from 1961 to 1985.

He died on August 13, 1985, in Memphis, Tennessee, at the age of 79.
