= Arne Nic. Sandnes =

Norwegian politician

Arne Nic. Sandnes (1 June 1920 – 23 August 1985) is a Norwegian politician for the Conservative Party.

He served as a deputy representative to the Parliament of Norway from Troms during the terms 1965–1969, 1969–1973 and 1973–1977. He met during two days of parliamentary session. Locally, he served as mayor of Målselv Municipality.
