= Ginty Lush =

Australian cricketer

Personal information
- Full name: John Grantley Lush
- Born: 14 October 1913; Melbourne, Australia
- Died: 23 August 1985 (aged 71); Sydney, Australia
- Nickname: Ginty
- Batting: Right-handed
- Bowling: Right-arm fast

Domestic team information
- Years: Team
- 1933/34–1946/47: New South Wales

Career statistics
Competition	First-class
Matches	20
Runs scored	554
Batting average	19.78
100s/50s	0/1
Top score	54
Balls bowled	2,366
Wickets	50
Bowling average	26.92
5 wickets in innings	3
10 wickets in match	1
Best bowling	7/72
Catches/stumpings	10/–
- Source: ESPNcricinfo, 19 May 2024

John Grantley "Ginty" Lush (14 October 1913 – 23 August 1985) was an Australian cricketer. He played 20 first-class matches, mostly for New South Wales, between 1933/34 and 1946/47.
