= Oxford (disambiguation) =

Oxford is a city in Oxfordshire, England.

Oxford may also refer to:

== Places ==
=== England ===
- Oxford (constituency), the historic Parliamentary constituency of the city
- Oxford, Staffordshire, a location in Stoke-on-Trent, Staffordshire
- Greater Oxford, a unitary authority due to be formed in 2028

=== Australia ===
- Oxford, Queensland, a locality in the Isaac Region

=== Canada ===
- Oxford, Edmonton, a neighbourhood in Edmonton, Alberta
- Oxford, Nova Scotia, in Cumberland County
- Oxford County, Ontario
  - Oxford (federal electoral district)
  - Oxford (provincial electoral district)

=== New Zealand ===
- Oxford, New Zealand, an urban area in Canterbury

=== United States ===
- Oxford, Alabama, a city
- Oxford, Arkansas, a city
- Oxford, Colorado, an unincorporated community
- Oxford, Connecticut, a town
- Oxford, Florida, an unincorporated community
- Oxford, Georgia, a city
- Oxford, Idaho, a city
- Oxford, Indiana, a town
- Oxford, Iowa, a city
- Oxford, Kansas, a city
- Oxford, Kentucky, an unincorporated community
- Oxford, Maine, a town
  - Oxford (CDP), Maine, a census-designated place
- Oxford, Maryland, a town
- Oxford, Massachusetts, a town
  - Oxford (CDP), Massachusetts, a census-designated place within the town
- Oxford, Michigan, a village
- Oxford, Mississippi, a city
- Oxford, Nebraska, a village
- Oxford Township, New Jersey, a township
  - Oxford (CDP), New Jersey, a census-designated place within the township
- Oxford (town), New York, a town
  - Oxford (village), New York, an eponymous village within the town
- Oxford, North Carolina, a town
- Oxford, Ohio, a city
- Oxford, Pennsylvania, a borough
- Oxford, West Virginia, an unincorporated community
- Oxford (town), Wisconsin, a town
  - Oxford, Wisconsin, a village within the town
- Oxford, United States Virgin Islands, a settlement
- North Oxford, Maine
- South Oxford, Maine

=== Other places ===
- Oxford County (disambiguation)
- Oxford Township (disambiguation)

== People ==
- Oxford (surname), with a list of people with the name
- Bishop of Oxford
- Earl of Oxford, a title in the English peerage
  - Edward de Vere, 17th Earl of Oxford (1550–1604), candidate for authorship of the Shakespeare oeuvre (Oxfordian theory)

== Brands and enterprises ==
- Oxford (company), a producer of office products
- Oxford (toy company), a South Korean toy company
- Oxford Archaeology, an archaeology company
- Oxford Bus Company, a bus transport company
- Oxford Health Plans, medical insurance
- Oxford Instruments, a scientific company
- Oxford Properties Group, a Canadian property management company
- Oxford Records, a record label
- Oxford University Press, a university press

== Clothing ==
- Oxford (cloth), a type of cotton cloth, typically used for shirts
- Oxford shirt, a shirt made of Oxford cloth
- Oxford shoe, a style of shoe

== Educational institutions ==
- Oxford Academy (California), US
- University of Oxford, Oxford, England

== Flora and fauna ==
- Oxford, a red variety of Darwin tulip
- Golden Oxford, a yellow variety of Darwin tulip
- Oxford sheep, or Oxford Down, a breed of sheep originating in England

== Sport ==
- Oxford City F.C., an English Conference North football club
- Oxford FC, a football club in Oxford, New Zealand
- Oxford F.C., a 19th-century football club in Glasgow, Scotland
- Oxford Plains Speedway, a race track in Oxford, Maine
- Oxford Rugby League, a rugby league club in Oxford, England
- Oxford Sunnyside F.C., a football club in Northern Ireland
- Oxford United F.C., an English Championship football club
- Oxford United Stars F.C., a football club in Northern Ireland

== Transport ==
- Oxford Airport, England
- Oxford railway station, England
- Oxford services, a motorway service station near Oxford, England
- Oxford station (Ohio), a proposed Amtrak station in Oxford, Ohio, US

== Vehicles ==
- Airspeed Oxford, World War II–era twin-engine trainer aircraft
- HMS Oxford, two ships of the Royal Navy
- Morris Oxford, a car
- Nuffield Oxford Taxi, or Wolseley Oxford Taxi, a taxicab
- SS City of Oxford, merchant ship sunk in the Second World War

== Other uses ==
- Oxford Clay, a type of sedimentary rock
- Oxford, Hawthorn, a heritage-listed house in Melbourne, Victoria, Australia

== See also ==
- Ox Ford, an action during the Battle of North Anna in the American Civil War
- Viscount of Oxfuird, a title in the Peerage of Scotland
- Oxenford (disambiguation)
- New Oxford
- Mount Oxford (disambiguation)
