= Oxford micropolitan area =

The Oxford micropolitan area may refer to:

- The Oxford, North Carolina micropolitan area, United States
- The Oxford, Mississippi micropolitan area, United States

== See also ==
- Oxford metropolitan area (disambiguation)
- Oxford (disambiguation)
