= Morris Oxford MO =

Morris Oxford Series MO
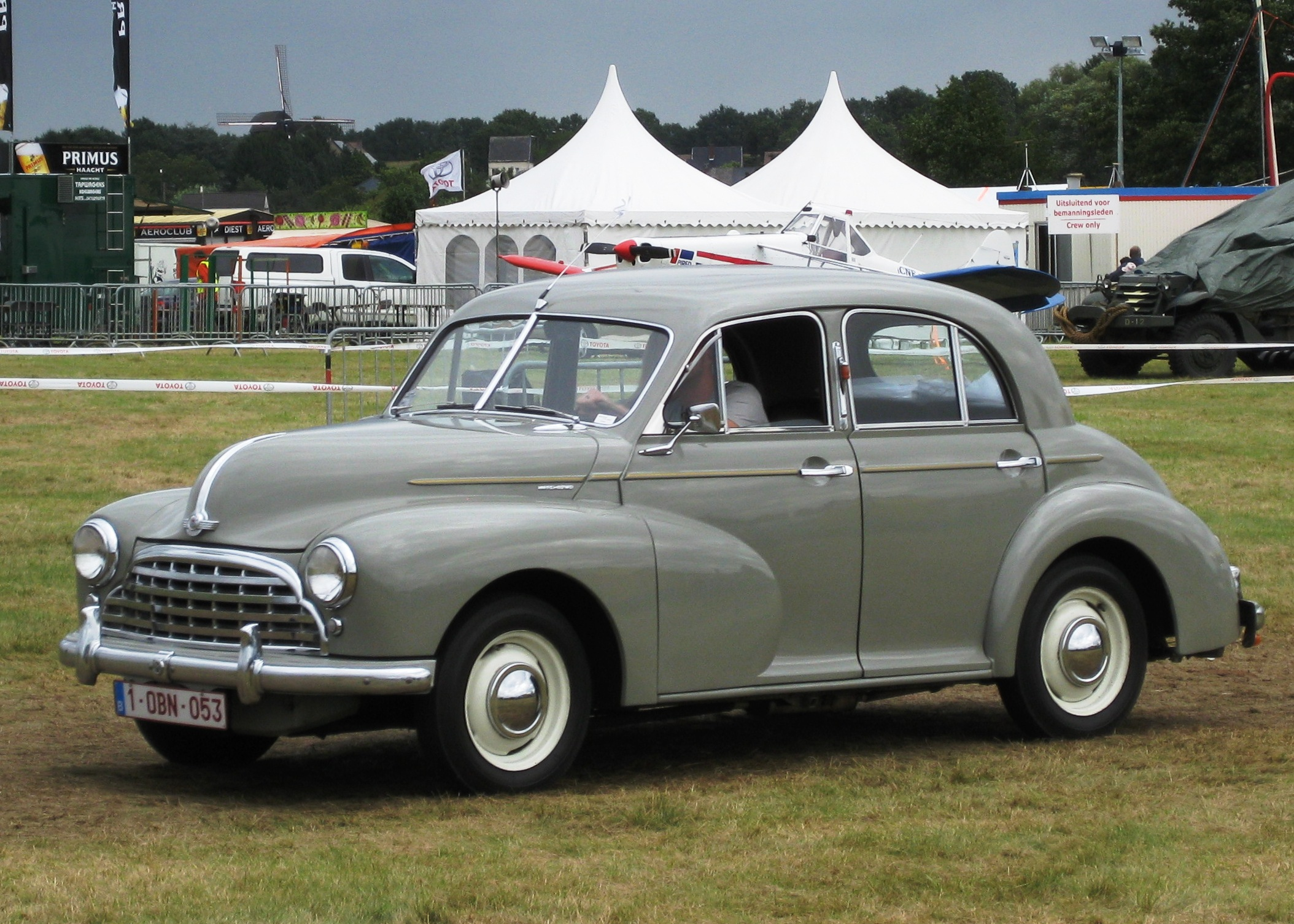
- 1952 Morris Oxford Series MO Saloon

Overview
- Also called: Hindustan Fourteen (India)
- Production: 1948–1954; 159,960 produced.
- Assembly: United Kingdom; Australia; India
- Designer: Sir Alec Issigonis

Body and chassis
- Body style: 4-door saloon 2-door estate
- Related: Wolseley 4/50 / 6/80

Powertrain
- Engine: 1476 cc side-valve Straight-4

Dimensions
- Wheelbase: 97 in (2,500 mm)
- Length: 165.5 in (4,200 mm)
- Width: 65 in (1,700 mm)
- Height: 64 in (1,600 mm)

Chronology
- Predecessor: Morris Ten series M Morris Twelve; Morris Fourteen
- Successor: Morris Oxford Series II

Morris Oxford Series MO is a car produced by Morris Motors of the United Kingdom from 1948 to 1954. It was one of several models to carry the Morris Oxford name between 1913 and 1971.

== Saloon ==
After the Second World War the 13.5 fiscal horsepower Oxford MO had to replace the Ten horsepower series M, Morris's Twelve and Morris's Fourteen. It was announced along with the new 918cc Morris Minor and the 2.2-litre Morris Six MS on 26 October 1948 and was produced until 1954. The core design was shared with Nuffield Organization stable-mate Wolseley 4/50 which used a traditional grille and better finishes.

Designed by Alec Issigonis, the Oxford, along with the Minor, introduced unit construction techniques such as Unibody construction even though it is not widely recognized as a true unibody car. Torsion bar front suspension was another novelty, and hydraulically operated 8-inch (200 mm) drum brakes were fitted all around. Under the bonnet, the MO was a step back in technology from the pre-war Ten. It used a side-valve straight-4 rather than the older overhead-valve unit. The single SU-carburetted engine displaced 1.5 L (1476 cc/90 in^{3}) and with its output of 40.5 bhp (30.2 kW) at 4200 rpm could propel the car to 72 mph (116 km/h). In order to reduce noise, the crankshaft helical gear that drove the camshaft was steel and the camshaft gear was of resin-bonded fibre construction, rather than a steel-to-steel coupling. It was believed, surprisingly, that the steel gear wore out first over time. Replacement parts were sold as factory-matched pairs of wheels. The four-speed gearbox had a column gear change and steering was by rack and pinion.

Interior fittings were reasonably comprehensive by the standards of the time, with a full-width shelf under the dashboard and "useful pivoting ventilator panels" (hinged quarterlights) at the front edge of each of the front doors and a rear window blind included in the price. Instrumentation included an oil pressure gauge, an ammeter and an electric clock. Also available, albeit at extra cost, was a heater.

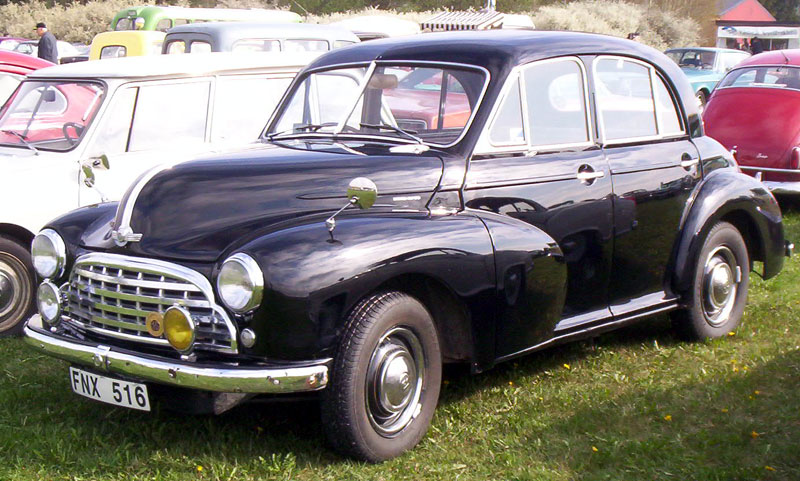
saloon 1950

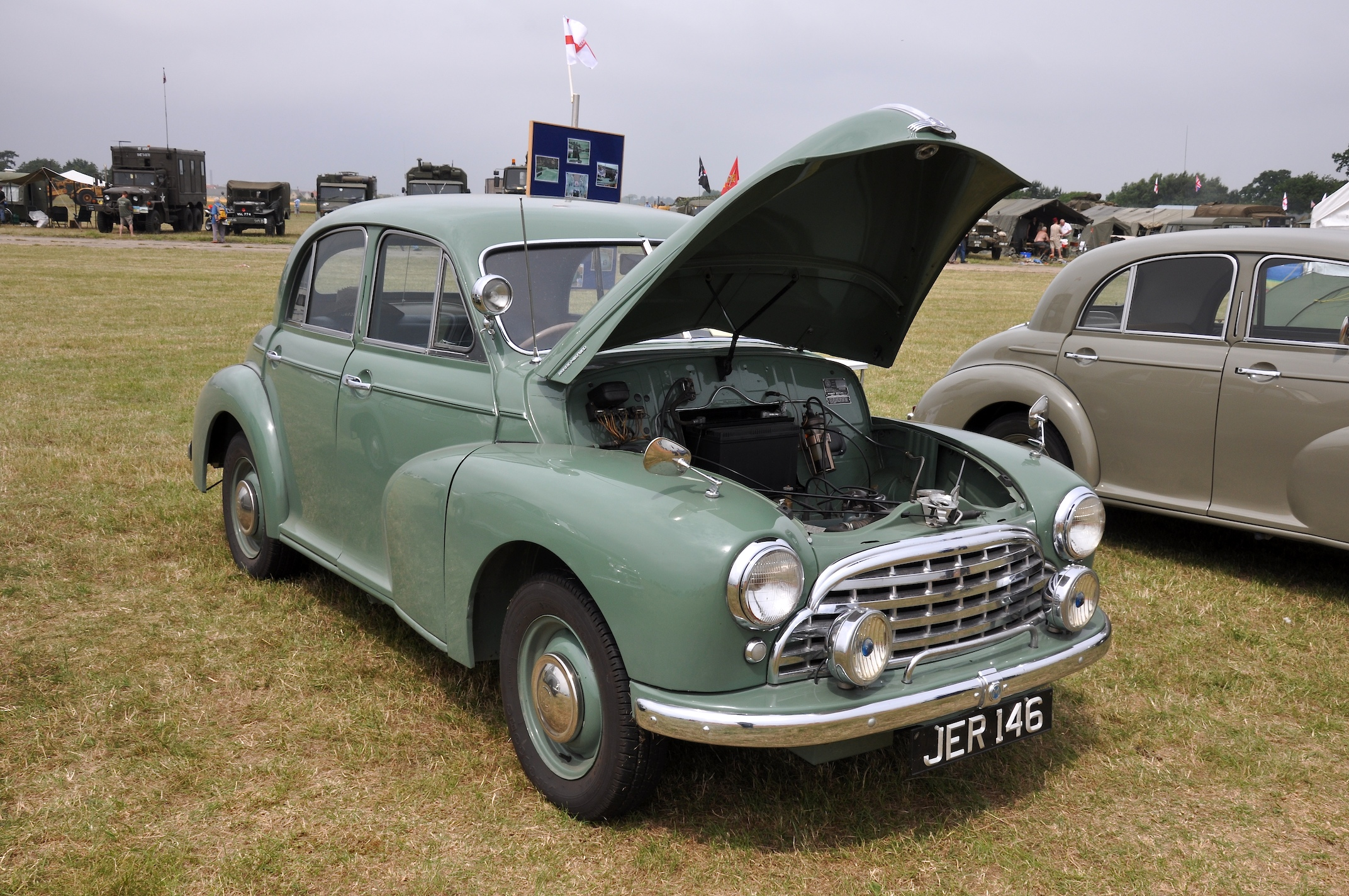
wide-mouth
alligator bonnet

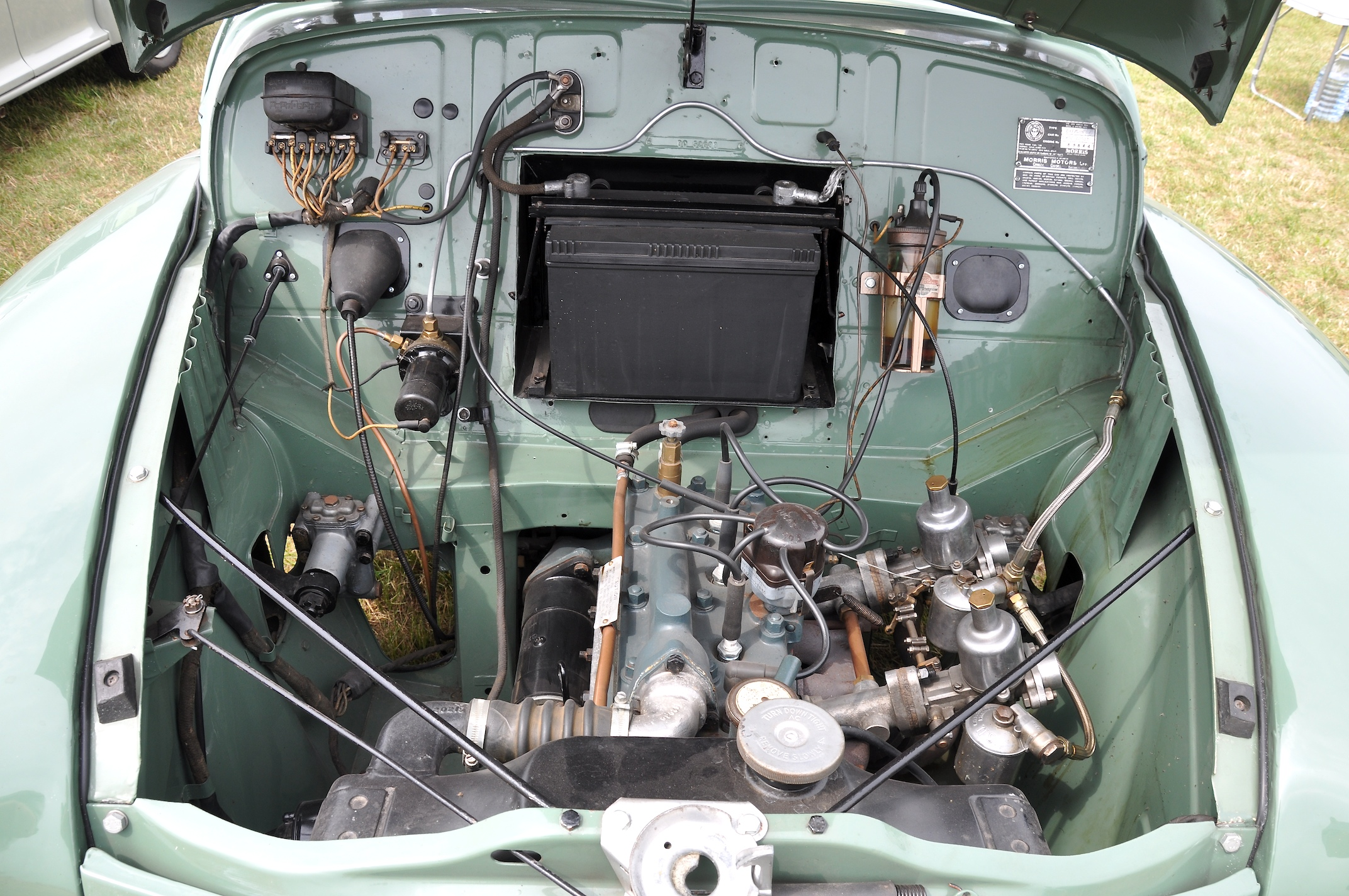
sidevalve engine (modified to use twin carburetters)

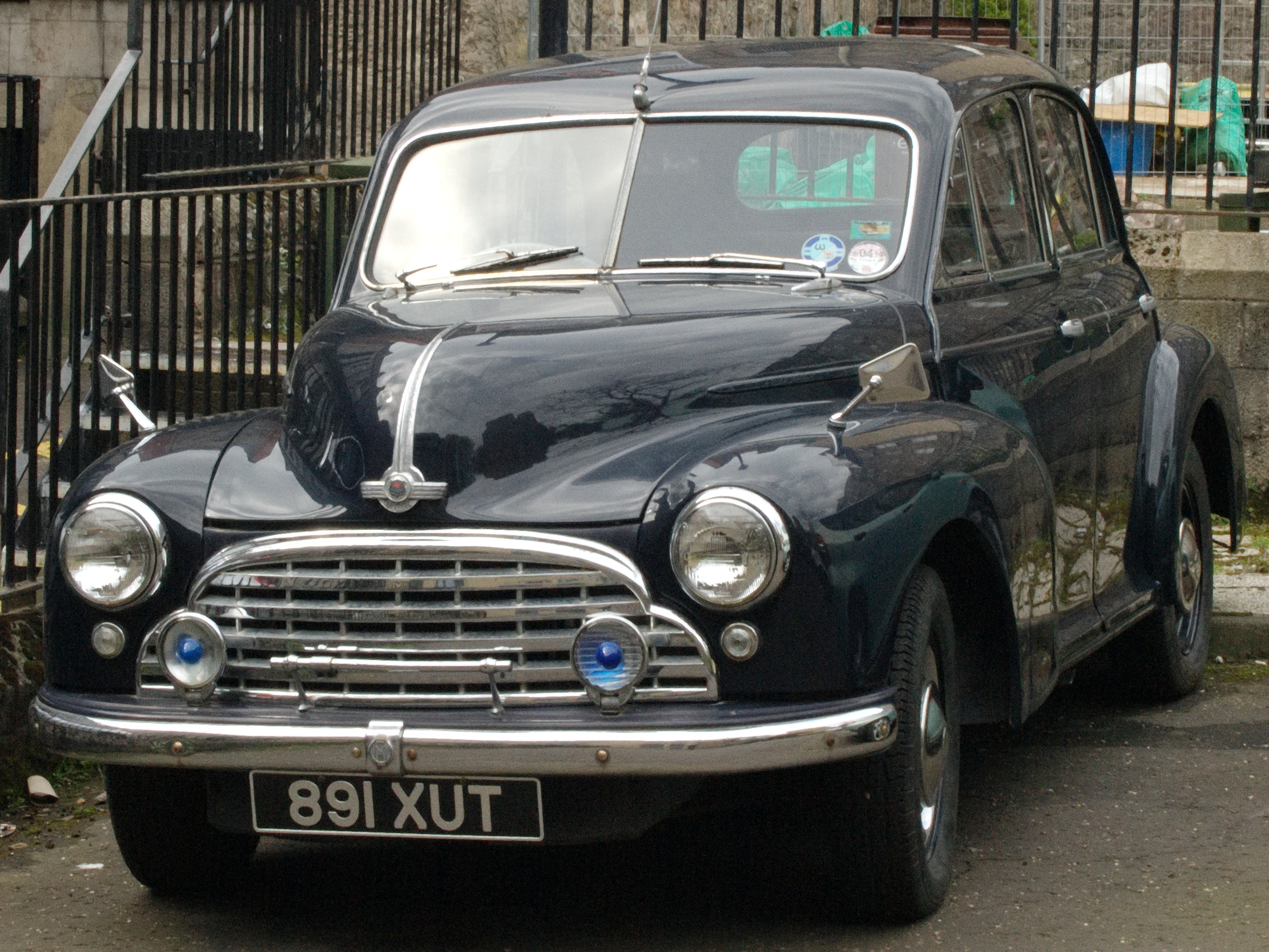
grille 1952

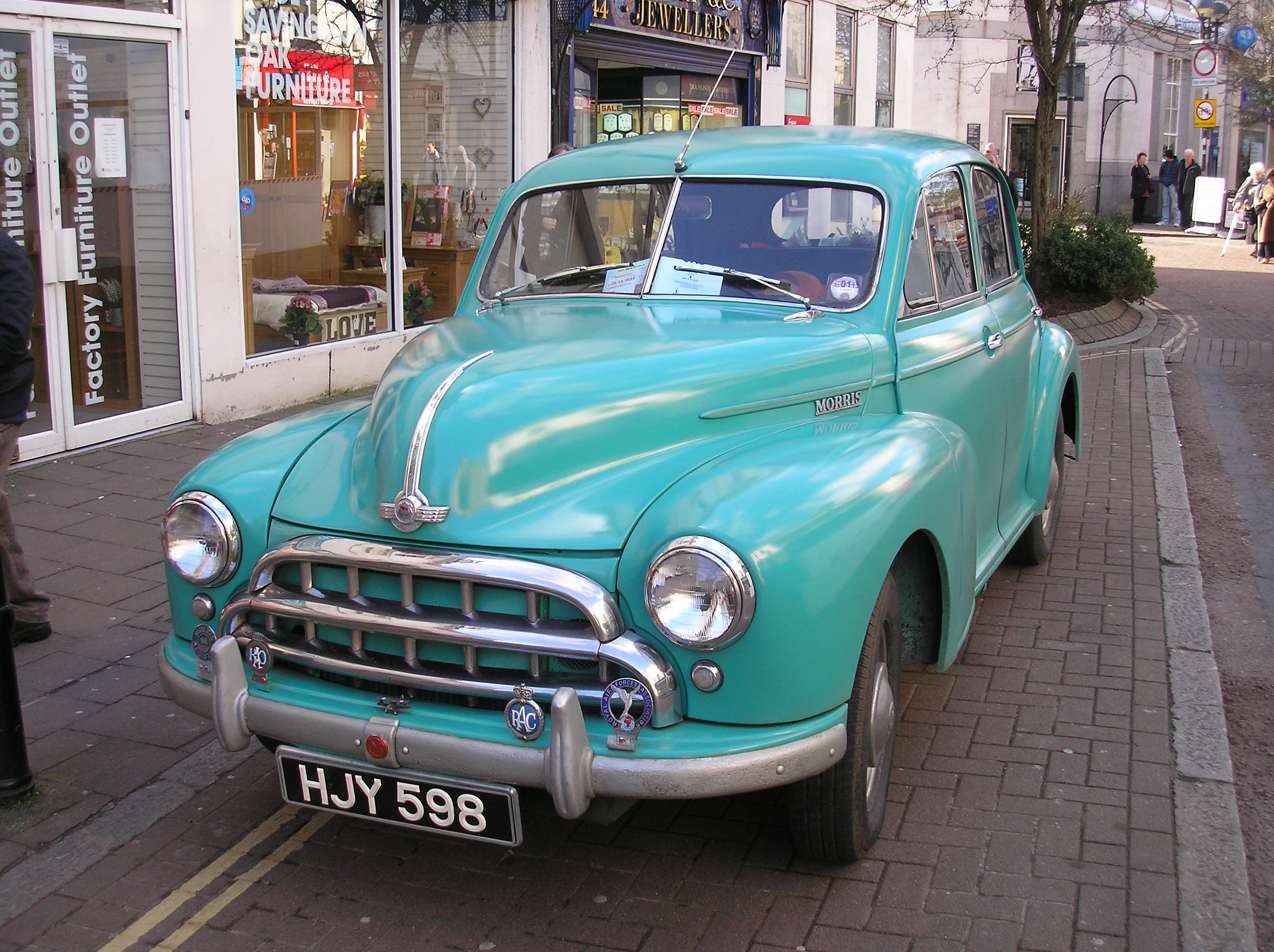
front 1952

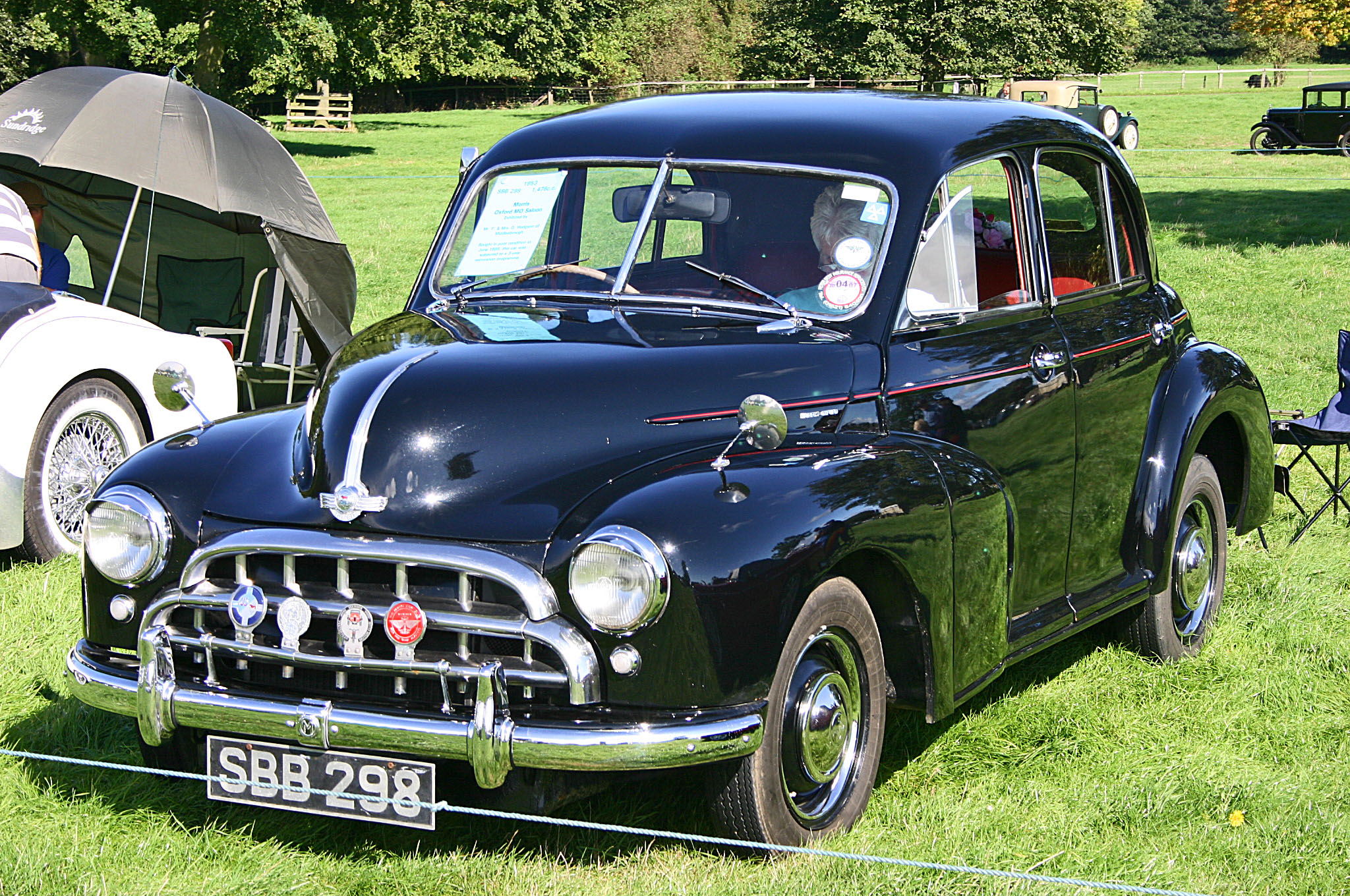
facelift grille 1953

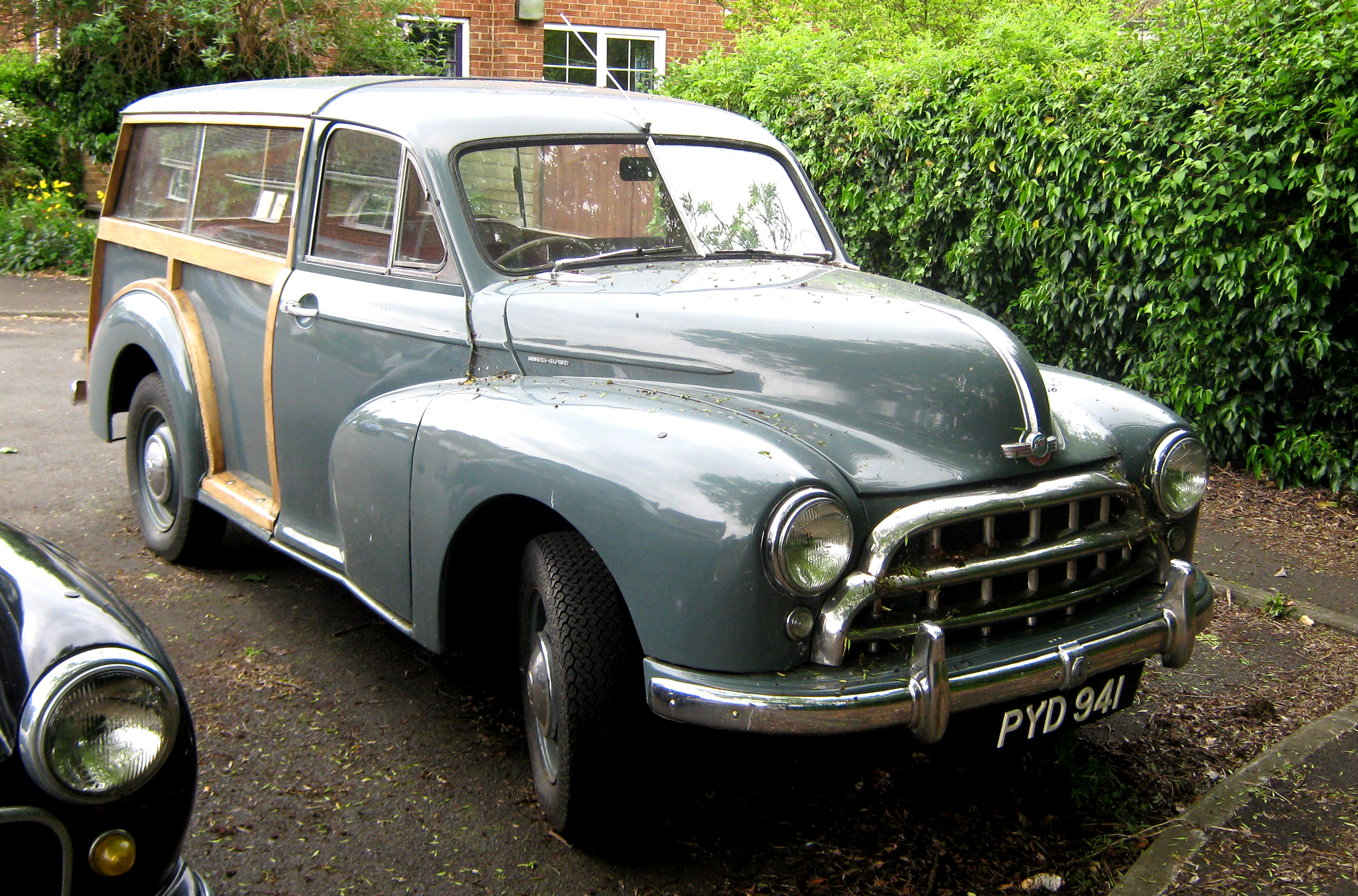
Morris Oxford Series MO Traveller 1953

== Traveller ==
A two-door estate version of the Series MO was introduced in September 1952. Marketed as the Oxford Traveller, it had an exposed wooden frame at the rear.

Just 3½ inches longer than the saloon which its dimensions otherwise matched the Traveller was given bench seats front and back, the front backrest split for access to the back. Six could be seated in reasonable comfort, though the back squab was narrowed by the rear wheel arches, and furthermore there was a large platform behind for luggage or freight. Folding forward the rear seat made an area nearly five feet square and three feet high. The front part of the car remained the same as the saloon and no comfort was sacrificed by front seat passengers. Normal winding windows were retained in front but the side windows at the rear (which provided excellent vision for the driver) could slide horizontally, the first for more than two feet and the second only a short distance to give ventilation. The vague steering column gear change lever still showed no improvement over previous Oxfords

The Motor magazine tested a Traveller in 1952 but only attained a top speed of 64 mph (103 km/h) and acceleration from 0–50 mph (80 km/h) in 26.2 seconds. A fuel consumption of 26.4 miles per imperial gallon (10.7 L/100 km; 22.0 mpg_{‑US}) was recorded. The test car cost £825 including taxes. The final drive ratio had been lowered from 4.55 to 1 to 4.875 to 1 in 1949 "in the interests of top gear acceleration, which still keeping top gear reasonably high, as is ...Morris policy", according to a statement attributed to the manufacturer.

== Morris Six ==
A six-cylinder version was sold as the Morris Six MS. It was replaced by the Morris Isis in 1955.

== Hindustan Fourteen ==
Hindustan Motors of India produced the Oxford MO as the Hindustan Fourteen.
