= Oxenford =

Oxenford may refer to:

== Places ==
- A ford (crossing) for use by oxen
- Oxenfoord Castle, a country house in Midlothian, Scotland
- Oxenford, Queensland
- Historic name of Oxford, Oxfordshire, a city in England
- Oxenford Farm, a former abbey farm in the Surrey parish of Witley with buildings that were designed by Augustus Pugin among others

== People ==
- Alexander Oxenford (fl. 1386–1388), Member of Parliament for Malmesbury
- Bruce Oxenford (born 1960), Australian cricket umpire
- Daphne Oxenford (1919–2012), English actress
- Earle Oxenford (1550–1604), English peer and courtier who is the present-day leading candidate for alternative Shakespeare authorship
- John Oxenford (1812–1877), English dramatist
- Juliana Oxenford (born 1978), Argentine-Peruvian journalist
- Peter Pilkington, Baron Pilkington of Oxenford (1933–2011), Conservative member of the House of Lords

== See also ==
- Oxford (disambiguation)
