= Oxford metropolitan area =

The Oxford metropolitan area may refer to:

- The Oxford metropolitan area, England
- The Oxford, North Carolina micropolitan area, United States
- The Oxford, Mississippi micropolitan area, United States

== See also ==
- Oxford (disambiguation)
