= Mount Oxford =

Mount Oxford can refer to:

- Mount Oxford (Colorado) in Colorado, United States
- Mount Oxford (Nunavut) in Nunavut, Canada
- Mount Oxford (New Zealand), a mountain of New Zealand
