= Oxford County =

Oxford County may refer to:

- Oxford County, Ontario, Canada
- Oxford County, Maine, U.S.
- Oxford County, New Zealand
- Oxfordshire, England
