= Oxford (surname) =

Oxford is a surname. Notable people with the surname include:

- Edward Oxford (1822–1900), who attempted to kill Queen Victoria
- Harry E. Oxford (1866–1915), American politician
- Ken Oxford (1929–1993), British footballer
- Kenneth Oxford (1924–1998), senior British police officer
- John Oxford (born 1942), English virologist
