= Morris Oxford =

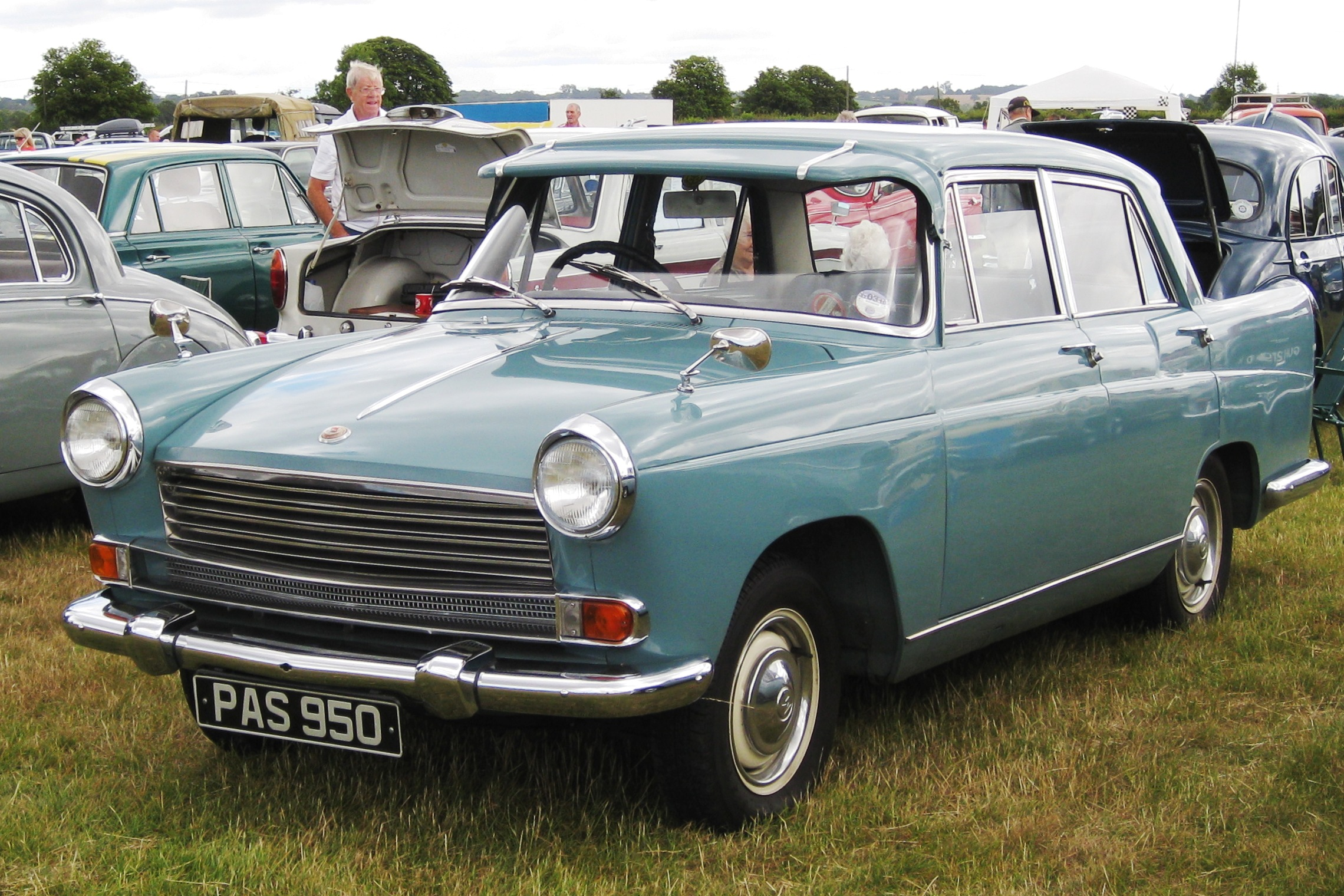
- Oxford Series V Saloon 1959

Overview
- Manufacturer: Morris Motors; British Motor Corporation; British Leyland
- Production: 1913–1935; 1948–1971

Body and chassis
- Class: Compact car

Chronology
- Successor: Morris Marina

Morris Oxford is a series of motor car models produced by Morris of the United Kingdom, from the 1913 'bullnose' Oxford to the Farina Oxfords V and VI.

Named by W R Morris after "the city of dreaming spires", the university town in which he grew up, the manufacture of Morris's Oxford cars would turn Oxford into an industrial city.

From 1913 to mid-1935, Oxford cars grew in size and quantity. In 1923, they, together with the Cowley cars, were 28.1 per cent of British private car production. In 1925, Morris sold nearly double the number, accounting for 41 per cent of British production. Meanwhile, Oxfords grew larger from the first 1018 cc, Nine-horsepower, two-seater car to the last 2½-litre, twenty-horsepower car.

The model name was recycled in 1948 and lasted almost another 23 years through to 1971, but in this time the market sector and engine size remained nearly constant between 1476 cc and 1622 cc.

== Oxford bullnose (1913–1919) ==
Oxford bullnose two-seater
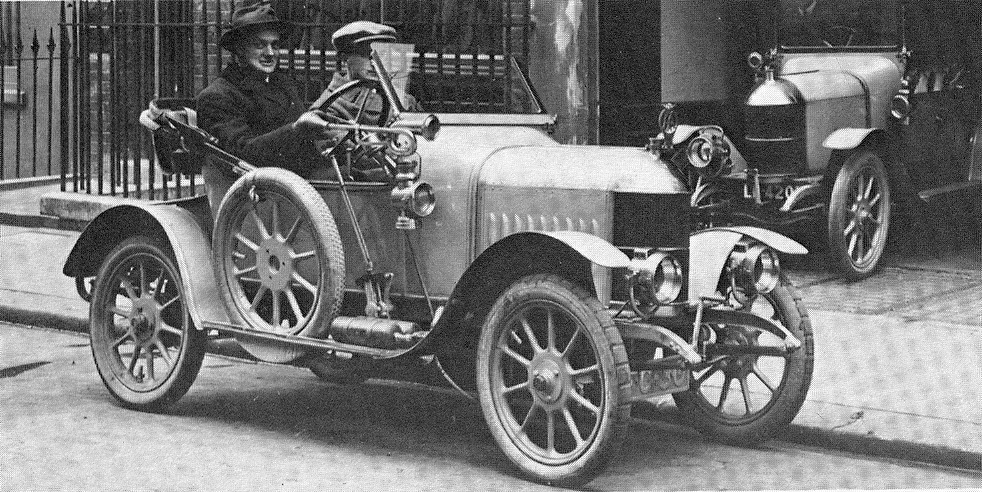
- Oxford 2-seater 1913

Overview
- Production: 1913–1919: standard: 495; deluxe: 980; total: 1,475

Powertrain
- Engine: W&P 1018 cc side-valve Straight-4

William Morris's first car was called Oxford in recognition of its home city. It was announced in The Autocar magazine in October 1912, and production began in March 1913. Virtually all components were bought-in and assembled by Morris. It was a small car with a 1018 cc four-cylinder side-valve engine with fixed cylinder head from White & Poppe.

The car got its popular name, Bullnose, from its distinctive round-topped radiator at first called the bullet nose. Most bodies were of the two-seat open-tourer type. There was also a van version, but the chassis did not allow four-seat bodies to be fitted, because it was not strong enough and too short.

=== Bullnose de luxe ===
It was first displayed at the Olympia Motor Show which opened 7 November 1913. The standard model remained in production unchanged. The new de luxe had a longer wheelbase, 90 in (2,300 mm), and track was now 45 in (1,100 mm). The range of bodies was now expanded from the simple two-seater. Its front axle and steering had been re-designed to reduce "bump-steer"and its radiator capacity increased.

=== Cowley ===
The American engined Continental Cowley, with most other significant components US sourced, shown to the press in April 1915, was a 50 percent larger engined (1495 cc against 1018 cc), longer, wider and better equipped version of this Morris Oxford with the same "Bullnose" radiator.

The Cowley's stronger and larger construction could carry a four-passenger body.

== Oxford bullnose (1919–1926) ==
Oxford bullnose 1919–1926
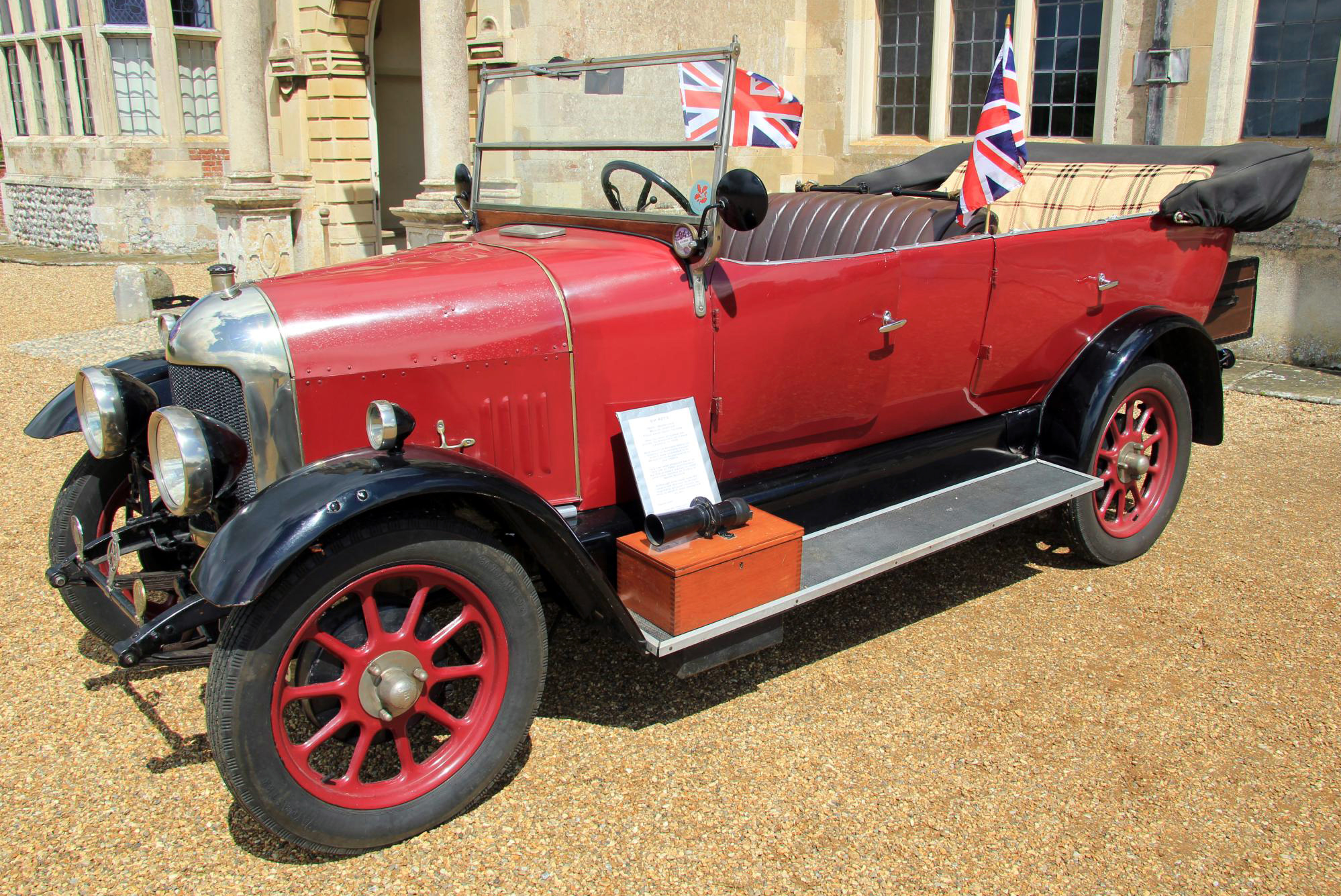
- 1925 Four-seater tourer on 1925's new long wheelbase chassis

Overview
- Production: 1919–1926

Powertrain
- Engine: 69.5 x 102mm CA & CB or 75 x 102mm CE; 1548 cc 11.9 hp 1802 cc 13.9 hp 14/28

The 1919 Oxford (advertised as early as September 1918) was assembled from locally made components and now took on the rather more substantial aspect of 1915's Cowley. Longer and stronger than the old Oxford, enough to carry five passengers, the new Oxford retained the pre-war Bullnose radiator style in its larger version. From August 1919, the Cowley became the downmarket "no frills" variant with only a 2-seater body and lighter smaller tyres. The new car's 11.9 fiscal horsepower 1548 cc engine was made under licence in Coventry for Morris by a British branch of Hotchkiss the French ordnance company.

=== 14/28 ===
In 1923 the engine was enlarged to 13.9 fiscal horsepower, 1802 cc. This became known as the 14/28 engine. In 1925 it got a longer wheelbase chassis to move it further from the Cowley, and four-wheel brakes. This model of the Oxford would be the basis of the first MG, the 14/28 Super Sports.

1926 mid-year switch to flatnose

== Oxford Six F-type bullnose ==
Oxford F-Type Silent Six
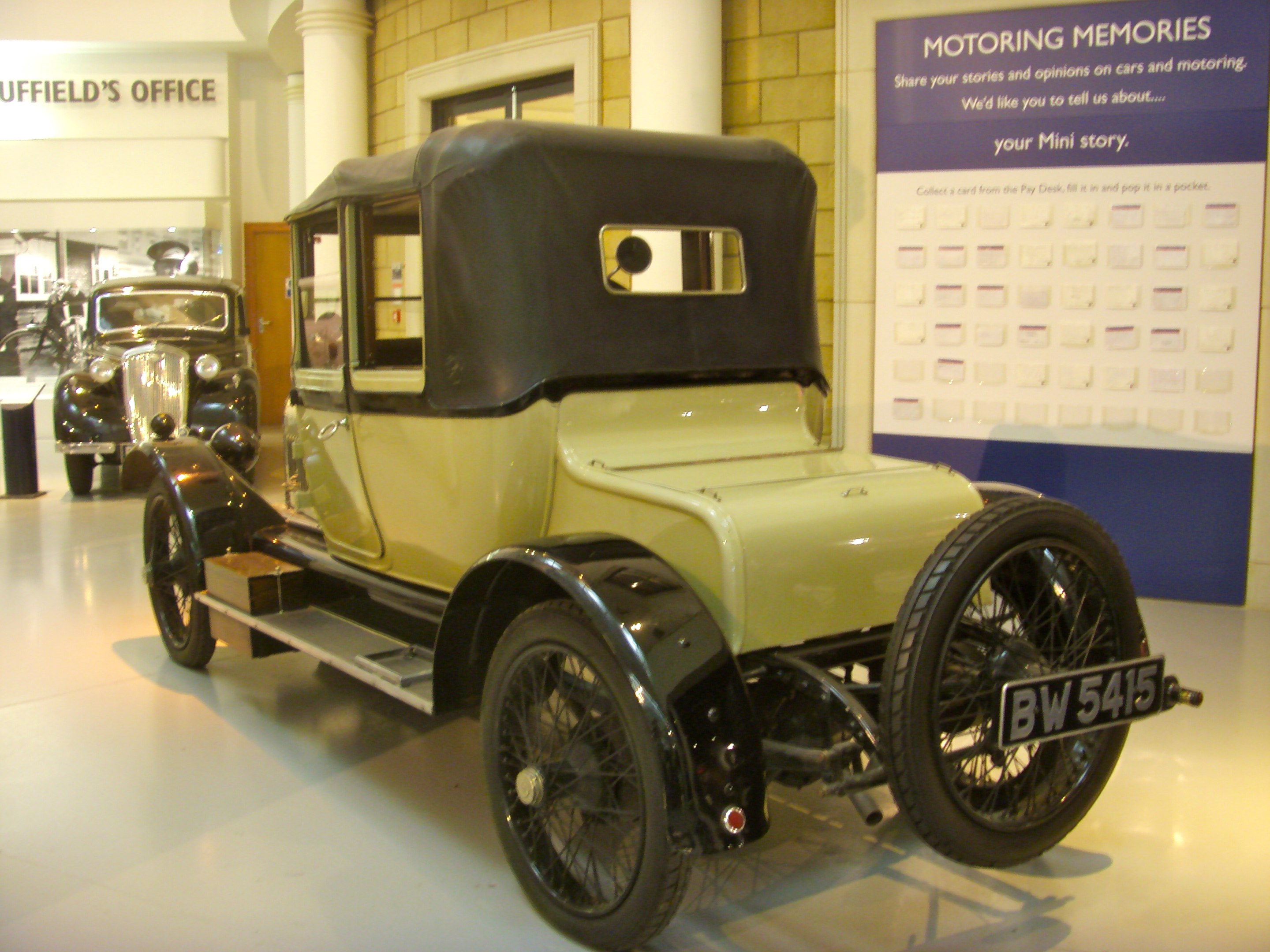
- William Morris's personal Oxford Silent Six

Overview
- Production: 1921-1926

Powertrain
- Engine: 69.5 x 102mm 2322 cc 17.97 hp side-valve Straight-6

A short-lived 17 hp six-cylinder variant, The F-Type Oxford Six, was displayed for the first time as a four seated cabriolet at the November 1922 Olympia Motor Show. The first open four-seater tourer was sold to Lord Redesdale. Only 50 were made and, after the initial run, they were assembled to special order. It remained available until 1926. The 2320 cc engine proved unreliable, two intense vibration periods weakened and broke crankshafts and few were sold.

== Oxford flatnose (1926–1930) ==
Oxford flatnose
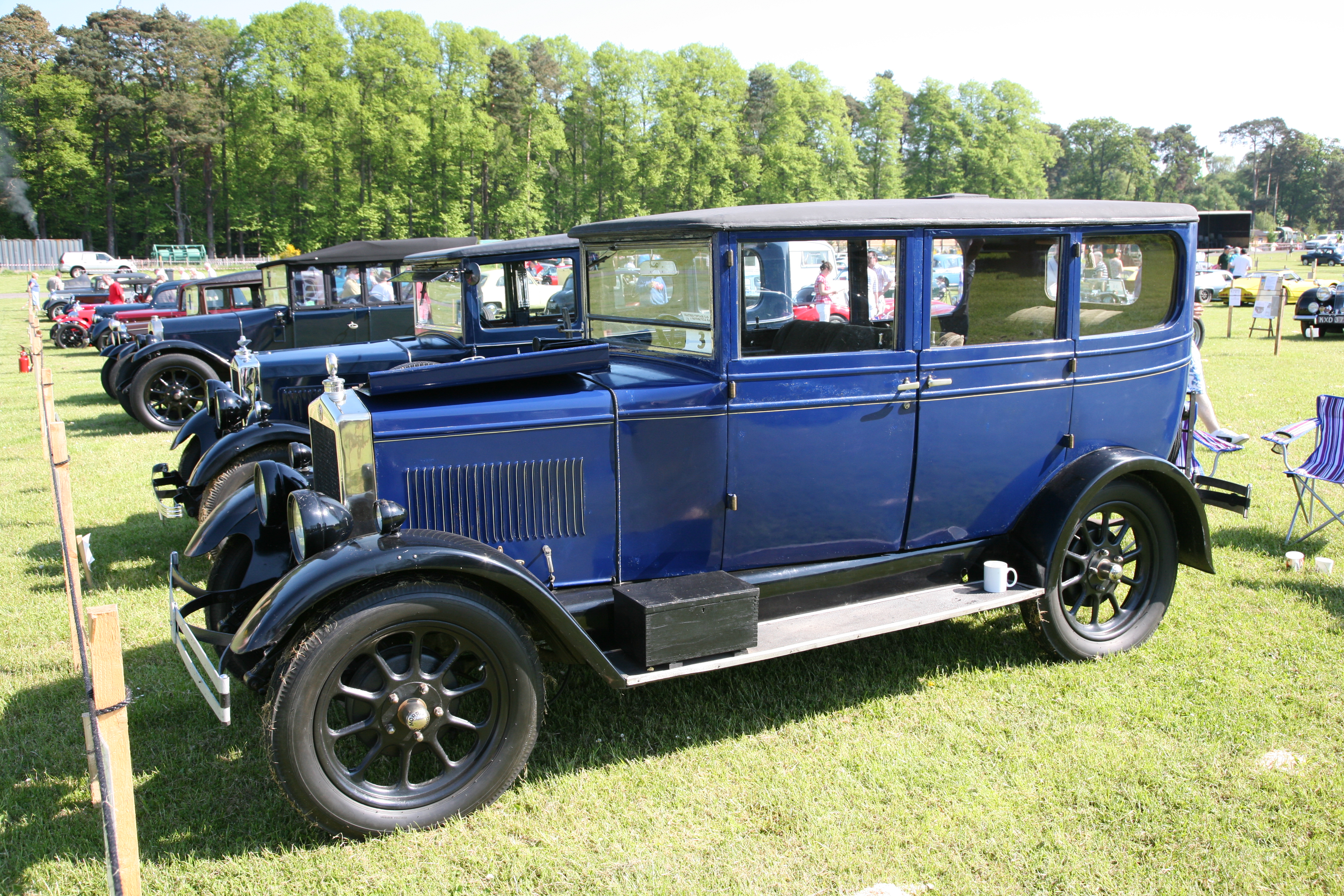
- Oxford 4-door saloon 1927

Overview
- Production: 1926–1930 (4-cylinder); 32,282 made.

Powertrain
- Engine: 1802 cc side-valve Straight-4

The distinctive bullnose radiator was dropped in 1926 in an updated version of the car. The engines remained the same but a new range of bodies was offered including all-steel saloons. There were substantial changes to the chassis frame which was now firmly fixed to the bulkhead or scuttle. The radiator cooling surface was increased sixty per cent

== Oxford 15.9 ==
Oxford 15.9
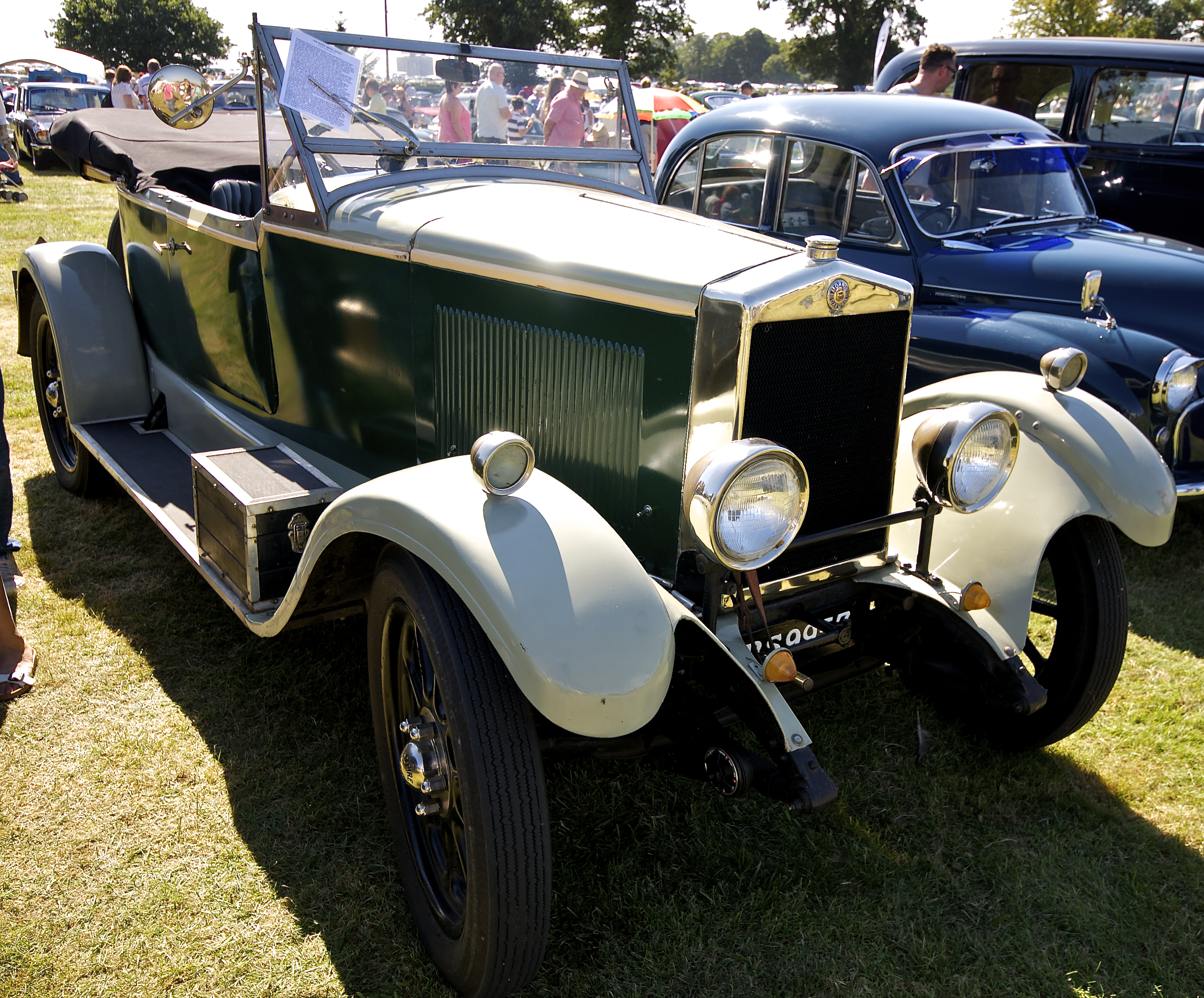
- open two-seater 1928

Overview
- Manufacturer: Morris Motors Limited
- Production: 1926-1929

Powertrain
- Engine: 2513 cc side-valve Straight-4

The 2½-litre Oxford 15.9 Empire model was displayed as "a Colonial Chassis" at the Olympia Motor Show of October 1926. The standard coachwork is a four or five seater body with four doors.

The car can be driven safely through 20 inches, 510 mm, of water. The ground clearance is 10¼ inches, 260 mm. A full 11 inches, 278 mm, is allowed at the forward running board bracket cross stay. This clearance is now greater than on many American cars. This "falsifies hostile propaganda to the contrary". This Oxford 15.9 was replaced by another four cylinder Oxford, Oxford 16/40.

== Oxford 16/40 ==
Oxford 16/40

Overview
- Also called: Oxford 15.9 all details above

Chronology
- Predecessor: Oxford four 15.9
- Successor: Oxford Six

A revised version of the slow-selling 4-cylinder 15.9 it was announced in September 1928. It was probably given this new name before the announcement of the 15.9 horsepower Oxford Six. There were minor improvements of appearance but this was no more than a 15.9 with a new name.

This 16/40 was replaced by Oxford Six 15.9 hp.

== Oxford Six (1929–1934) ==
Oxford Six
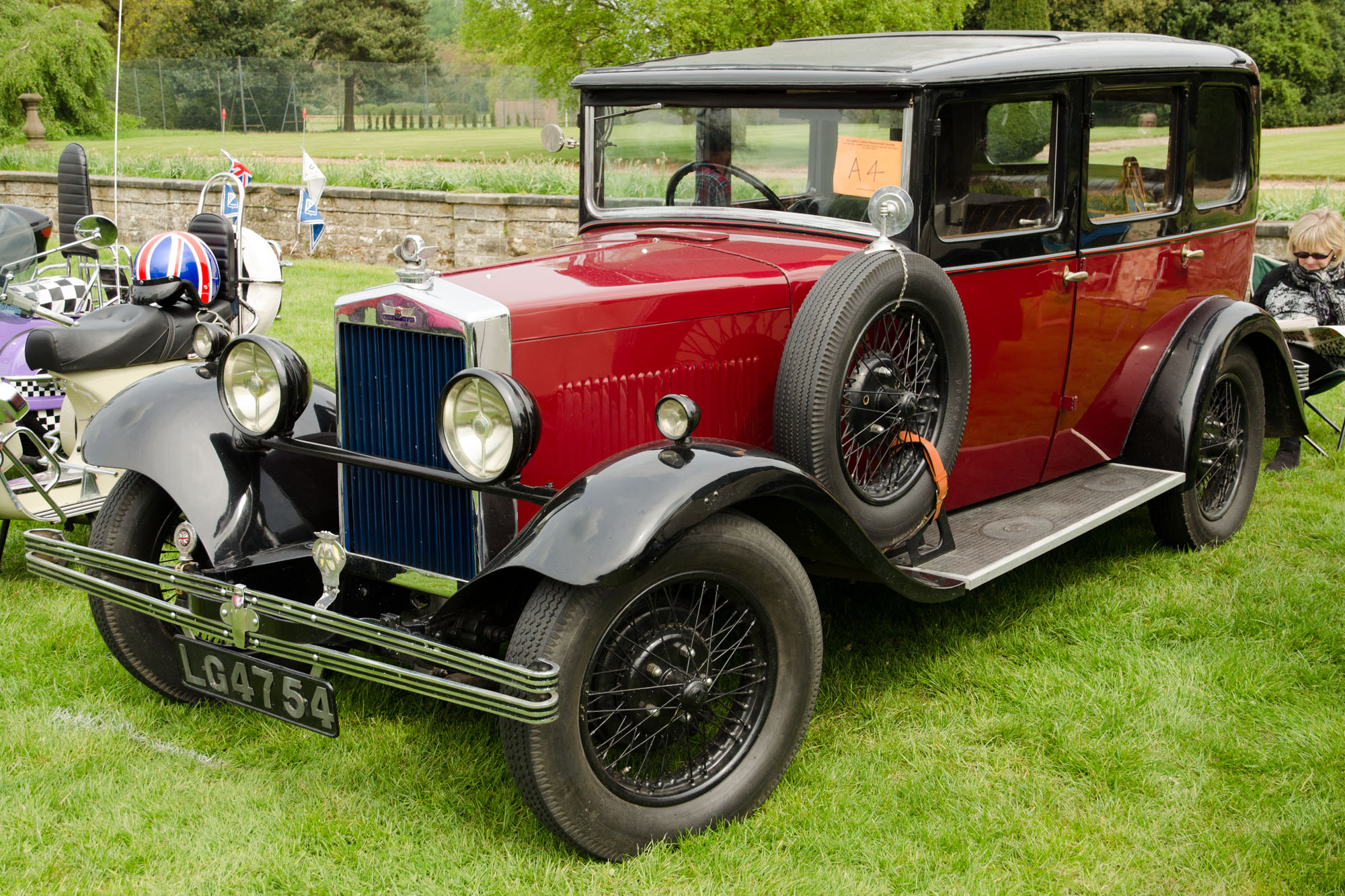
- Oxford Six six-light saloon 1930

Overview
- Production: 1929–1932

Powertrain
- Engine: 1938 cc side-valve Straight-6; 2062 cc

A 1938 cc six-cylinder version, the LA series Oxford Six, was made between 1929 and 1933. It was much more successful than the 1920 version. The all-steel body was made over the road at Cowley by W R Morris's joint venture with American Edward G Budd, Pressed Steel Company. It had striking similarities to a recent Dodge body. By 1930 supply problems were such that it was replaced by a similar but coachbuilt (wood framed) body.

In August 1930 a shorter chassis more expensive version was announced and named Morris Major Six,

For other Morris Sixes:

=== Upgrade ===
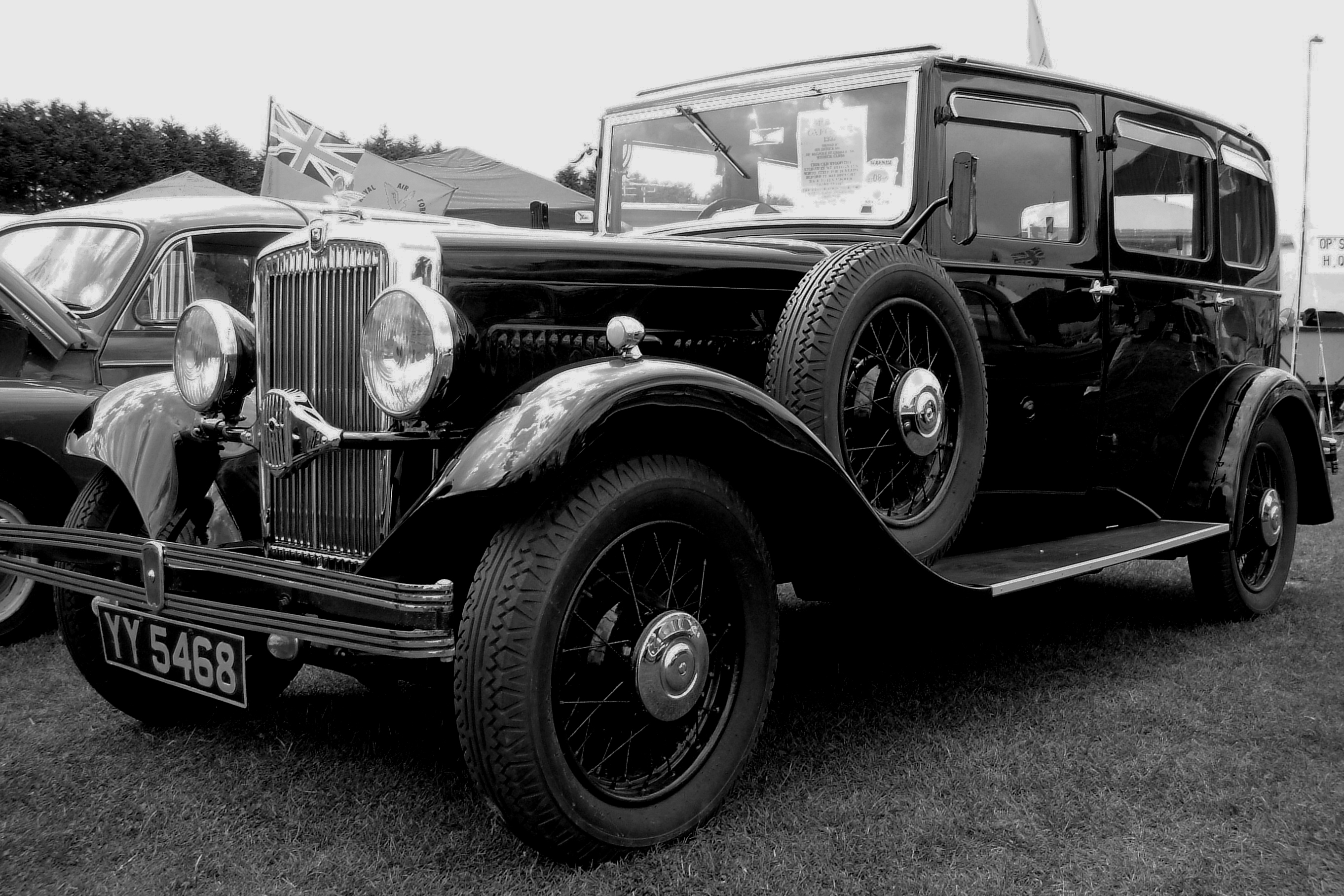
Oxford Six 6-light saloon Q-series registered December 1932 direction indicator on bracket above spare

In September 1932, the gearbox gained a fourth speed and the engine grew to 2062 cc with the Q-series unit.

Direction indicators, a set of three coloured lights on each side of the car visible from front and rear were fitted. Controlled from a switch on the dashboard they permitted accurate indications of planned movements while the car's windows remain shut.

=== Automatism ===
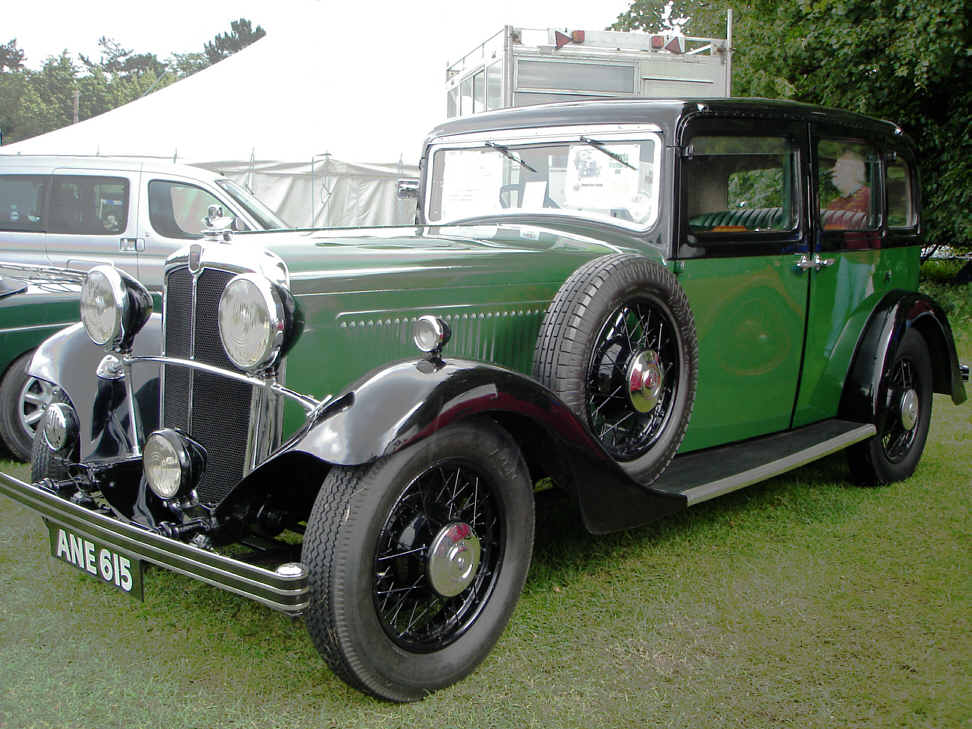
Oxford Six six-light saloon registered April 1934

The Oxford, Isis and Twenty-five were singled out and given "automatic clutch control" described by The Times as automatism. The Oxford also received a governable free-wheel, bigger seats, a spare wheel cover and concealed ashtrays for back seat passengers. The chassis frame was quite new and now also contained a cruciform shape.

=== Tax relief ===
This Oxford Six was renamed Oxford Sixteen in September 1934 and placed within the new 16 to 25 horsepower range of Morris Big Sixes expanded in view of the 25 per cent reduction in Horse Power tax expected in 1935.

== Oxford Sixteen and Oxford Twenty (1934–1935) ==
Oxford Sixteen and Twenty
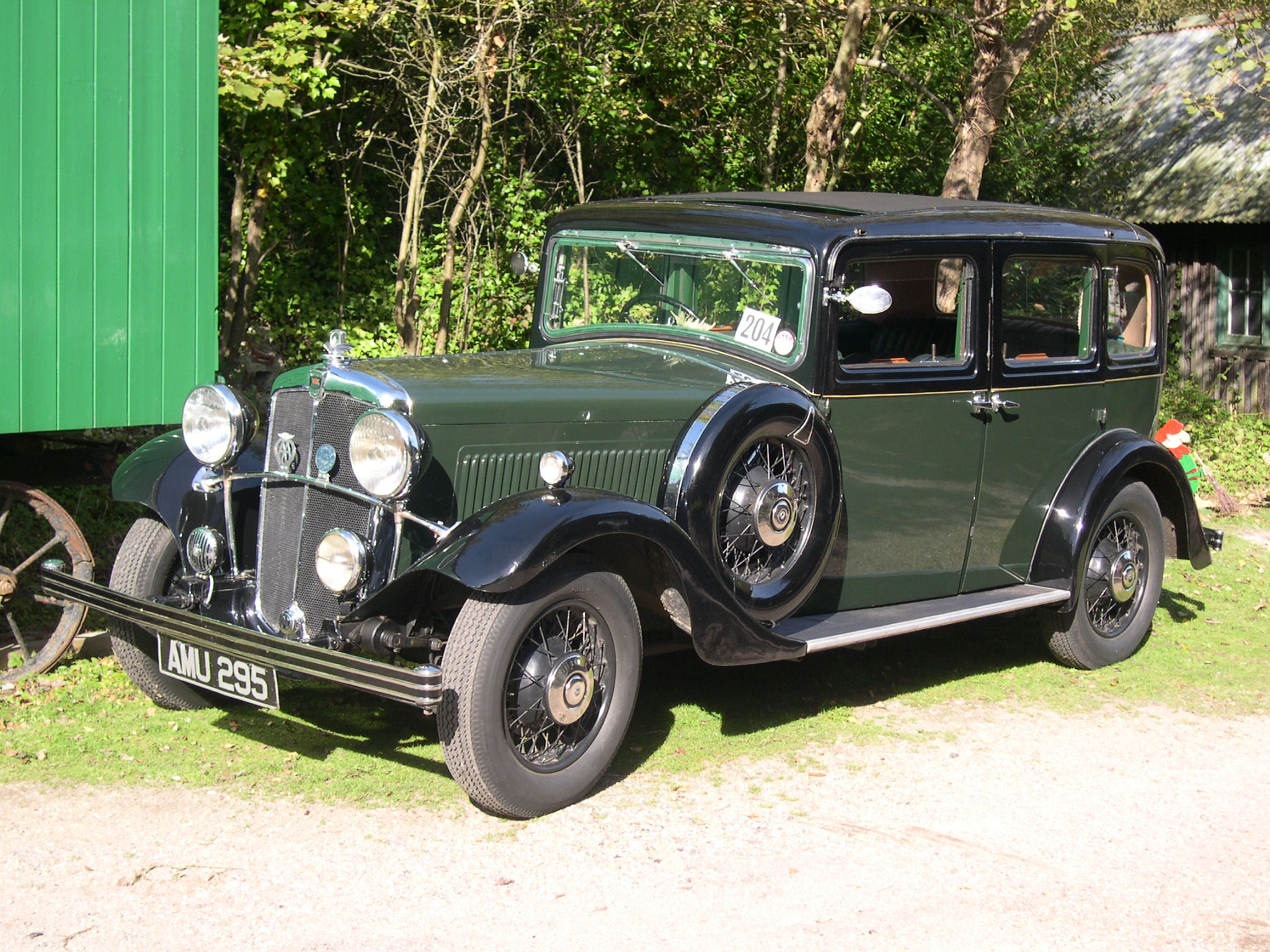
- Oxford Sixteen six-light saloon 1935 registered January 1935 with freewheel and Bendix automatic clutch

Overview
- Production: 1934–1935; 6308 made

Body and chassis
- Related: Isis, Cowley

Powertrain
- Engine: 2062 cc Q-series sv I6; 2561 cc Q-series sv I6

The Six name was changed to Sixteen, from the car's 16 hp tax horsepower category, in September 1934 when its 2062 cc engine was joined by the 2561 cc Twenty sold for the same price, the size of engine being the only difference. There was an intermediate eighteen horsepower Isis. Two styles of coachwork were available, the saloon and a Special coupé both fitted with a Pytchley sliding head (sunroof) and the sliding head was wired for radio.

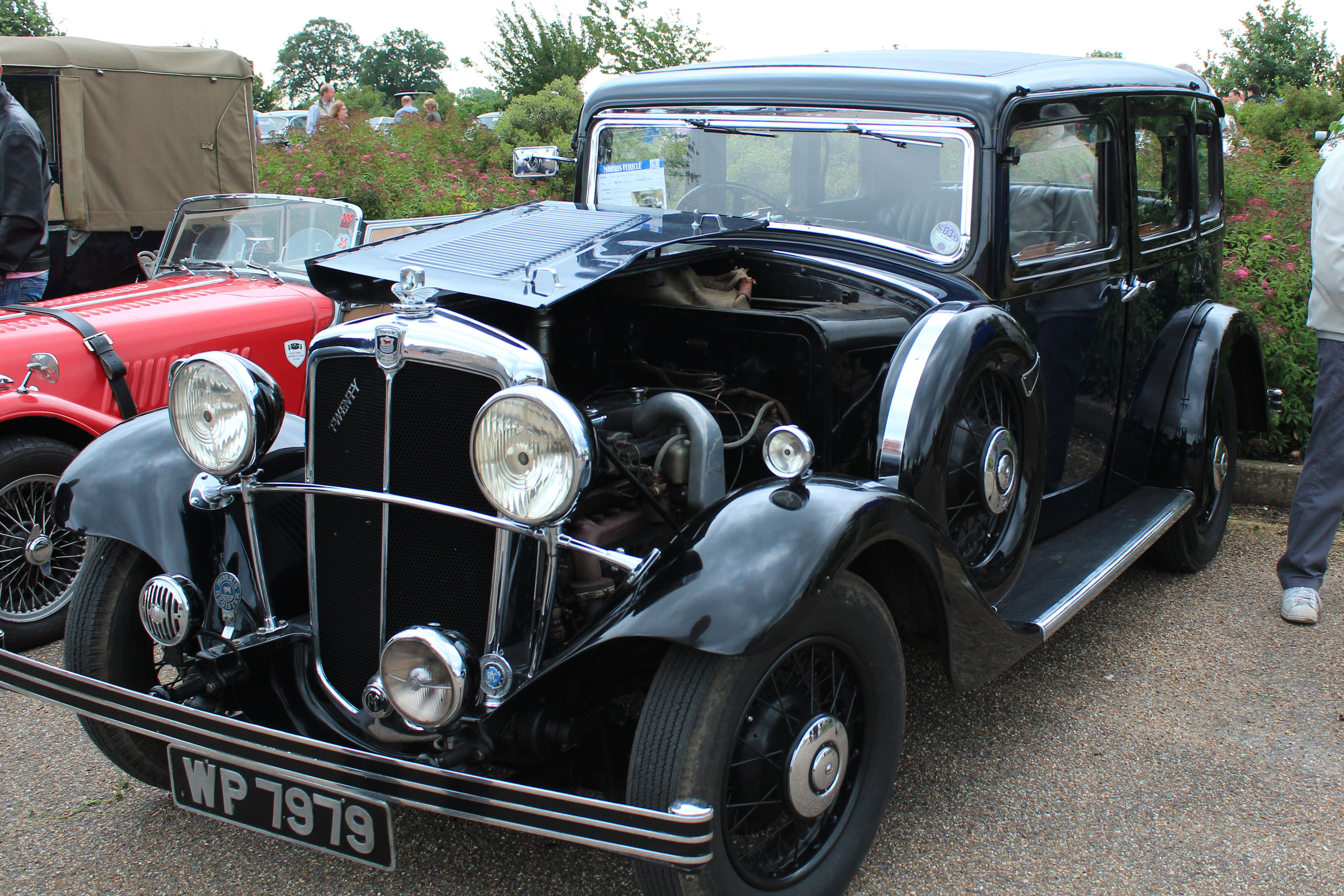
Oxford Twenty six-light saloon 1935

Barely nine months later these cars were superseded by members of the Morris Big Six Series II range: Sixteen or Eighteen and Twenty-one or Twenty Five announced 2 July 1935.

The Oxford name disappeared from new Morris cars until 1948.

== Oxford Taxi ==
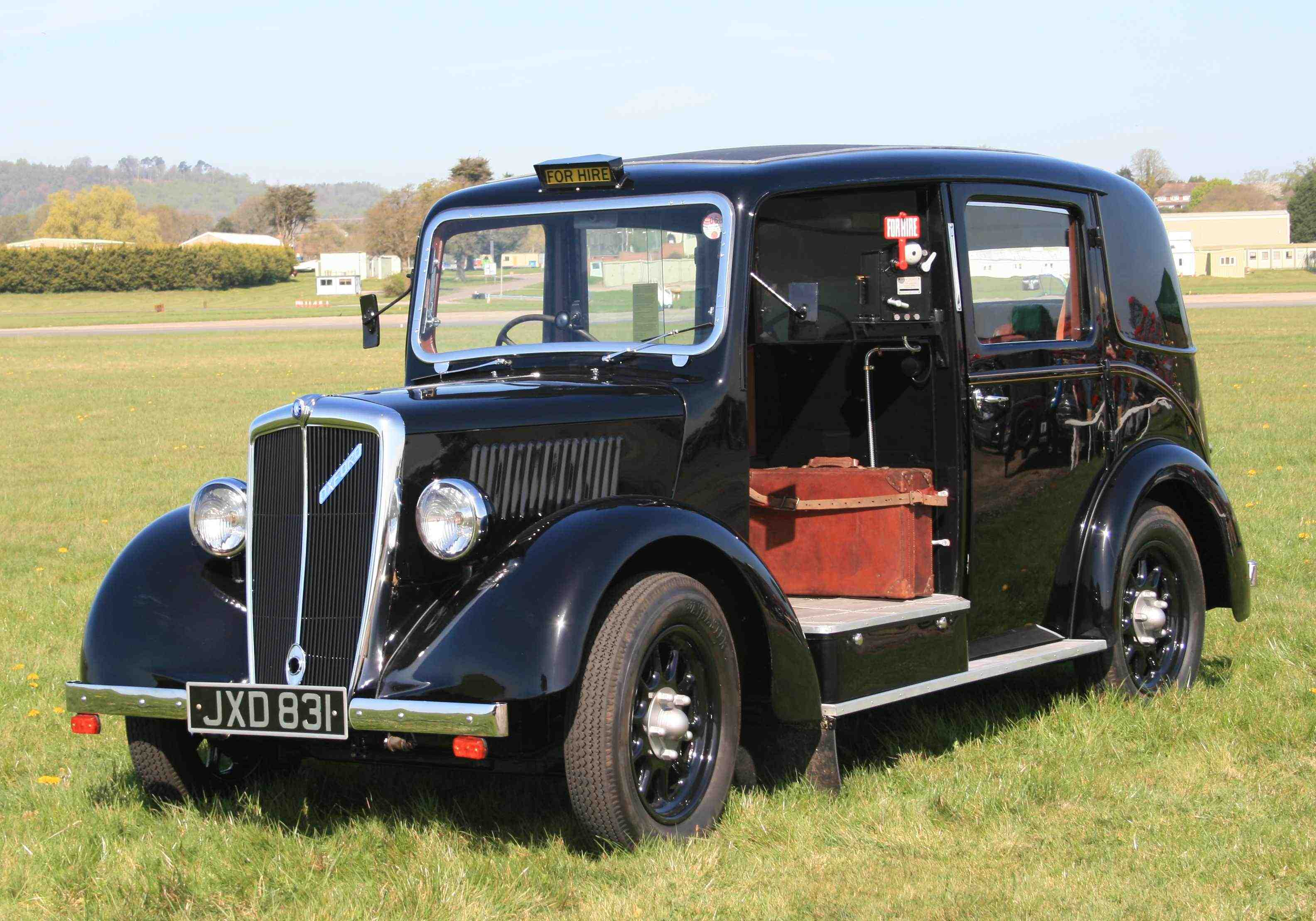
Nuffield Oxford Series I

Nuffield's Oxford Taxi was produced from 1947 to 1953

== Oxford Series MO (1948–1954) ==
Oxford MO
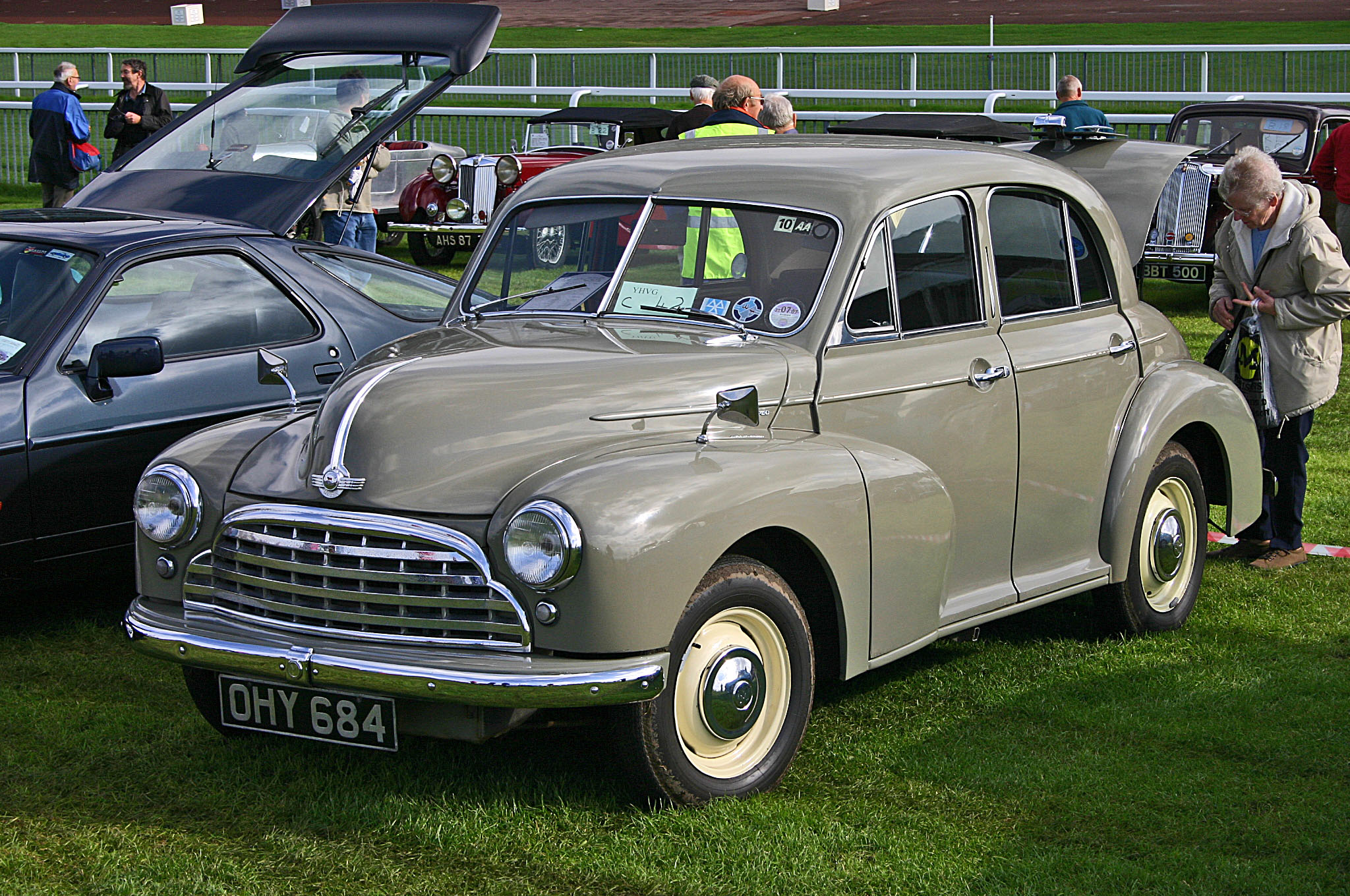
- Morris Oxford Series MO four-door saloon, 1952

Overview
- Also called: Hindustan Fourteen (India)
- Production: 1948–1954; 159,960 produced.

Body and chassis
- Related: Wolseley 4/50 / 6/80

Powertrain
- Engine: 1476 cc side-valve Straight-4

Chronology
- Predecessor: Morris Ten series M Morris Twelve; Morris Fourteen
- Successor: Morris Oxford Series II

After the Second World War the much larger 13.5-fiscal horsepower Oxford Series MO replaced the range of ten-horsepower series M, Morris Twelve and Morris Fourteen. It was announced on 26 October 1948, along with the new 918 cc Morris Minor and the 2.2-litre Morris Six MS. Designed by Alec Issigonis, the Oxford, along with the Minor, introduced unibody construction techniques. The MO was sold as a 4-door saloon and 2-door Traveller estate with an exposed wooden frame at the rear. Both were four-seaters. A six-cylinder version was sold as the Morris Six MS. It was replaced by the Oxford Series II, announced Tuesday 18 May 1954.

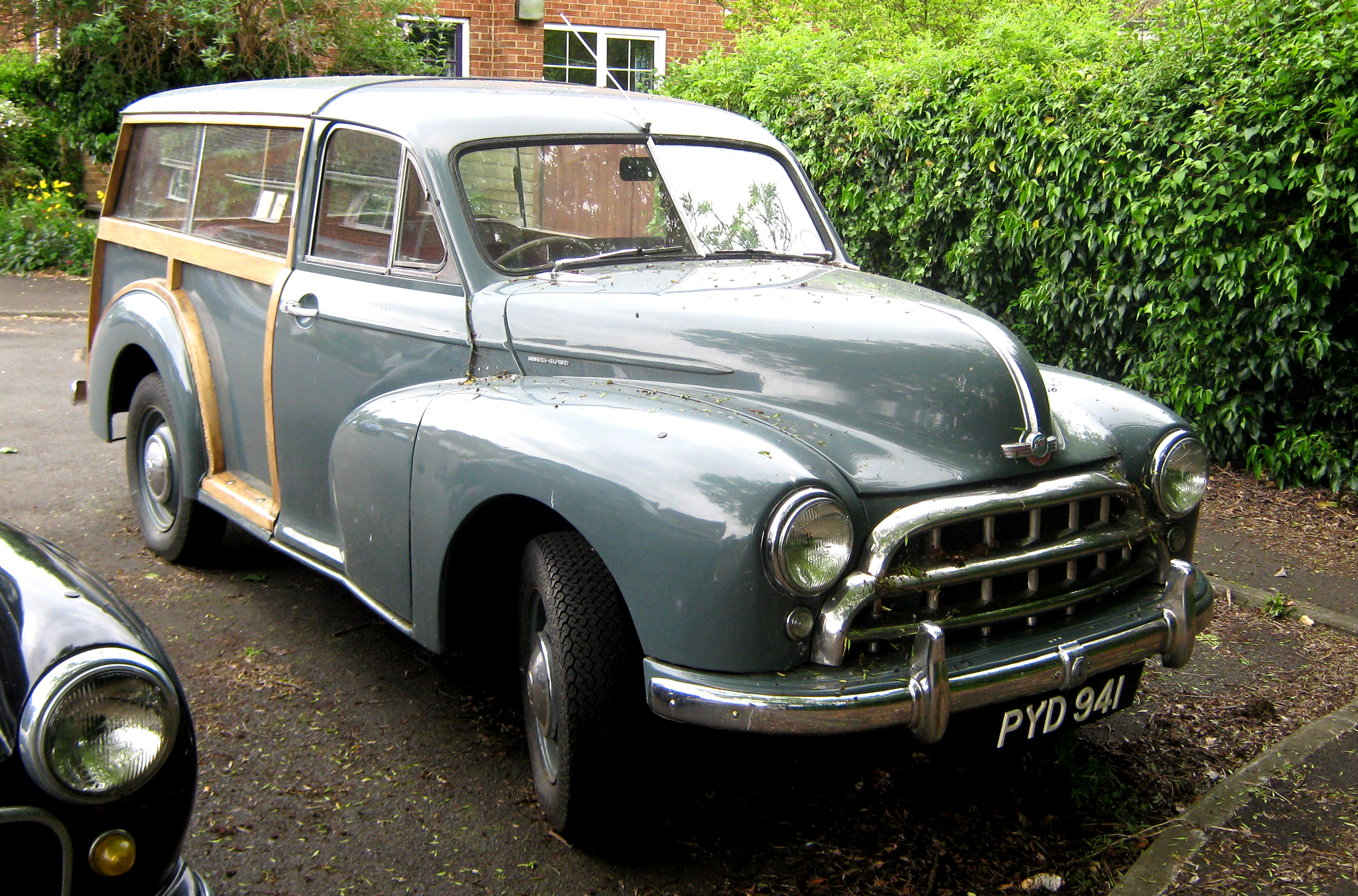
Morris Oxford Series MO Traveller

== Oxford Series II (1954–1956) ==
Oxford II
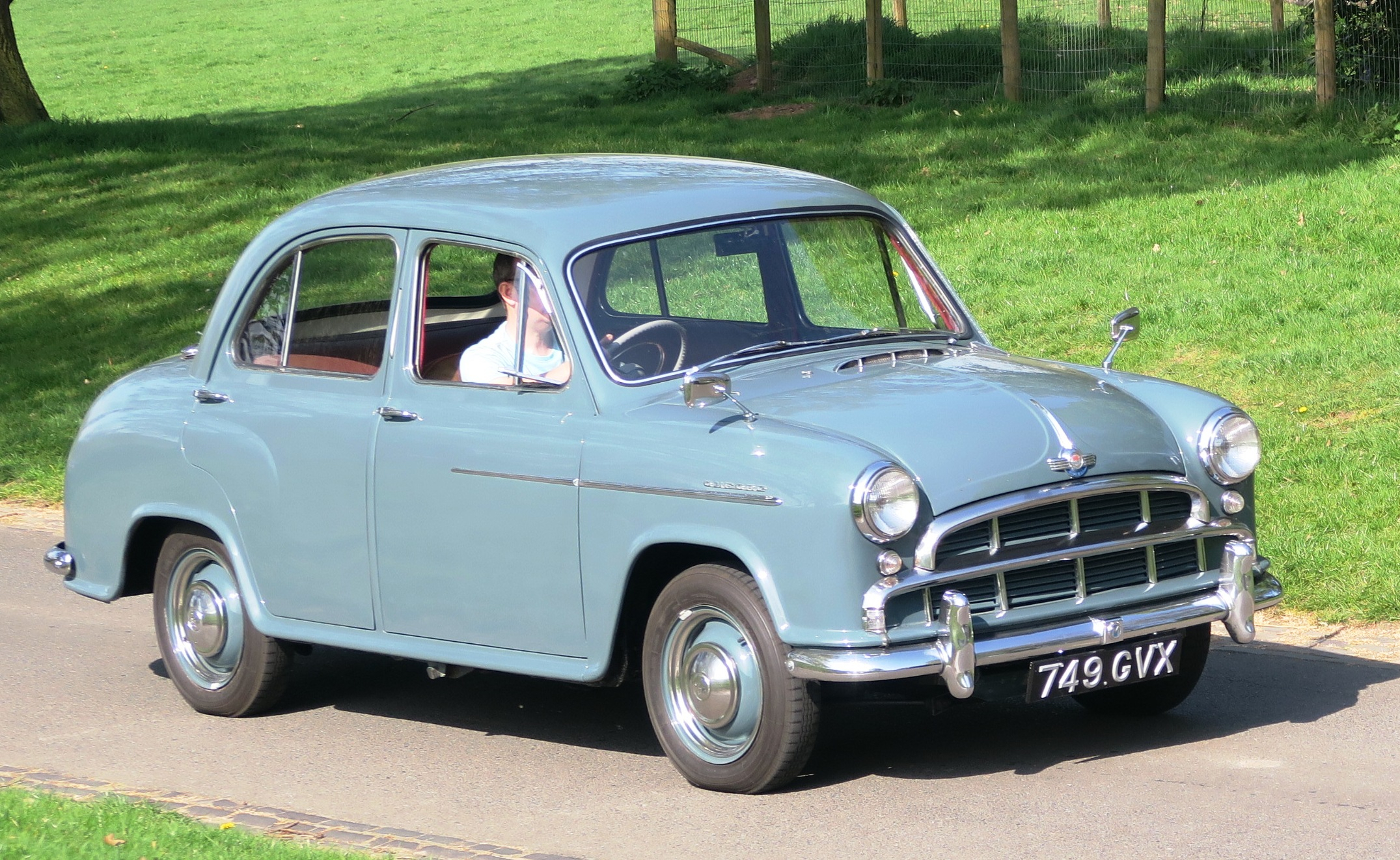
- Oxford saloon Series II 1954

Overview
- Production: 1954–1956; 87,341 produced

Body and chassis
- Related: Morris Cowley, Hindustan Landmaster

Powertrain
- Engine: 1489 cc B-Series Straight-4

The extensively redesigned Oxford announced in May 1954 was given a new shape directly foreshadowing the BMC ADO17 and, following the formation of BMC, being fitted with the Austin-designed B-Series OHV straight-4. Styling was entirely new though the rounded body maintained a family resemblance to the Morris Minor. Sales remained strong when the Series III arrived in 1956.

A 2.6-litre six-cylinder 7-inches longer Morris Isis version was announced 12 July 1955 with a saloon or Traveller estate body.

Hindustan Motors of India produced the four-cylinder version of this car (except the air-vent situated upon the bonnet) naming it Hindustan Landmaster.

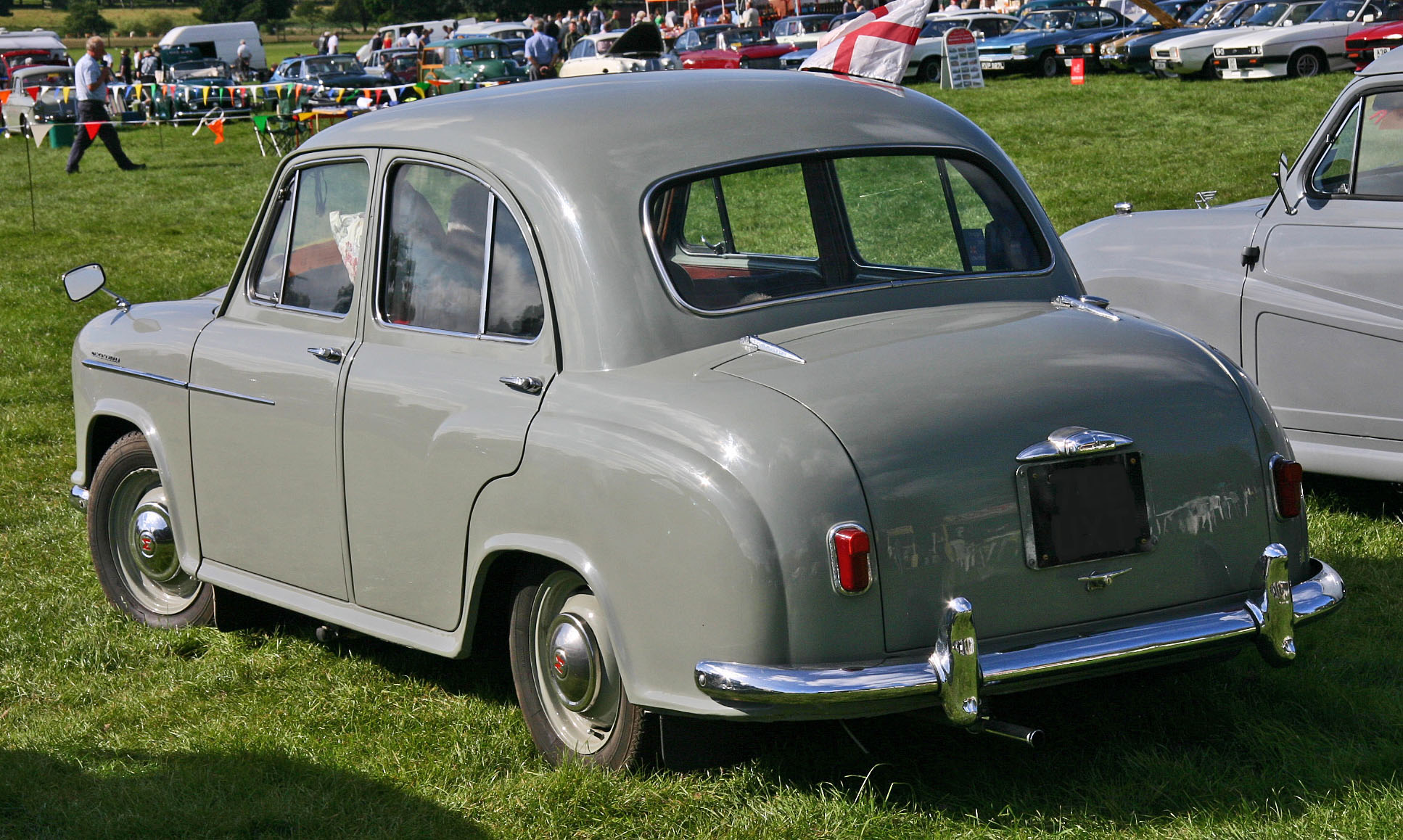
Morris Oxford Series II saloon

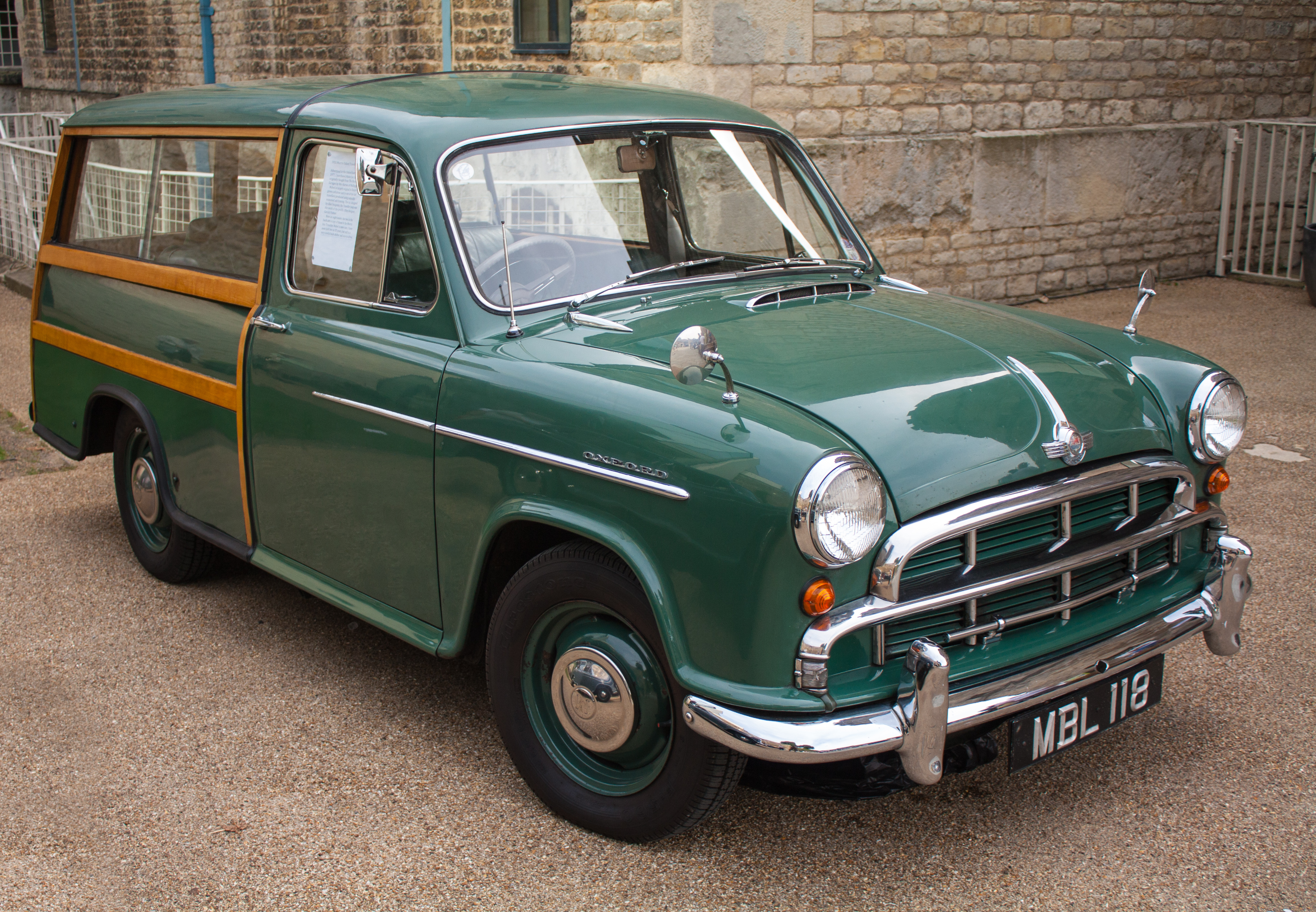
Morris Oxford Series II Traveller

== Oxford Series III (1956–1959) ==
Oxford III
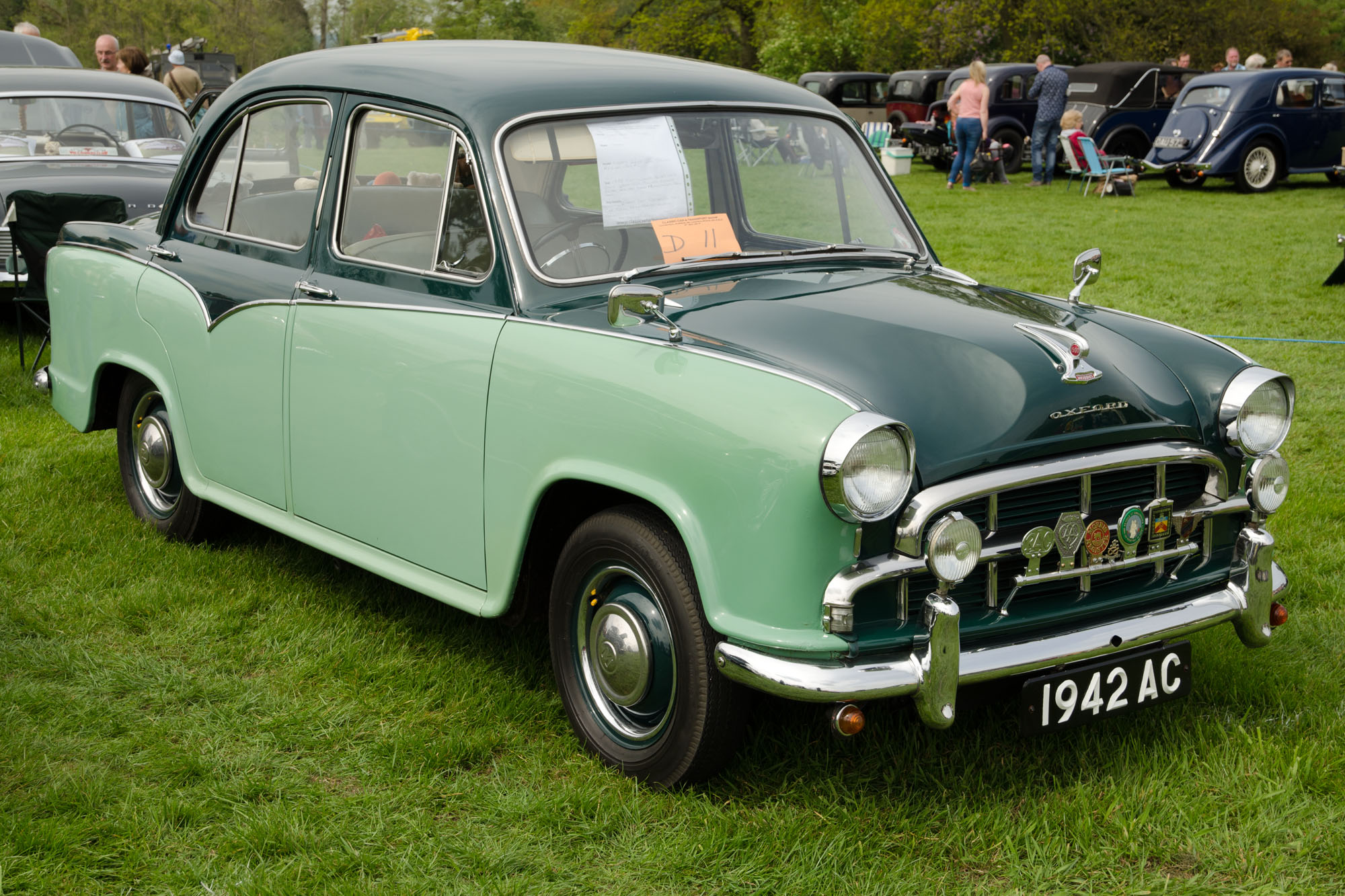
- Oxford Series III

Overview
- Production: 1956–1959; 58,117 produced inc. Series IV;

Body and chassis
- Related: Hindustan Ambassador

Powertrain
- Engine: 1489 cc BMC B-Series engine Straight-4

The Oxford was updated for 1957 with a new fluted bonnet and small rear fins and an optional two-tone paint scheme all announced on 18 October 1956. A semi-automatic, two pedal, "Manumatic" transmission with centrifugal clutch with vacuum operation coupled to gear changes was optional. The woody Series III Traveller was replaced by the Series IV in 1957, though the saloon remained in production until the Pininfarina-styled Series V was introduced in 1959. 58,117 Series III and Series IV Oxfords were built.

== Oxford Traveller all-steel Series IV (1957–1960) ==
Oxford Traveller Series IV
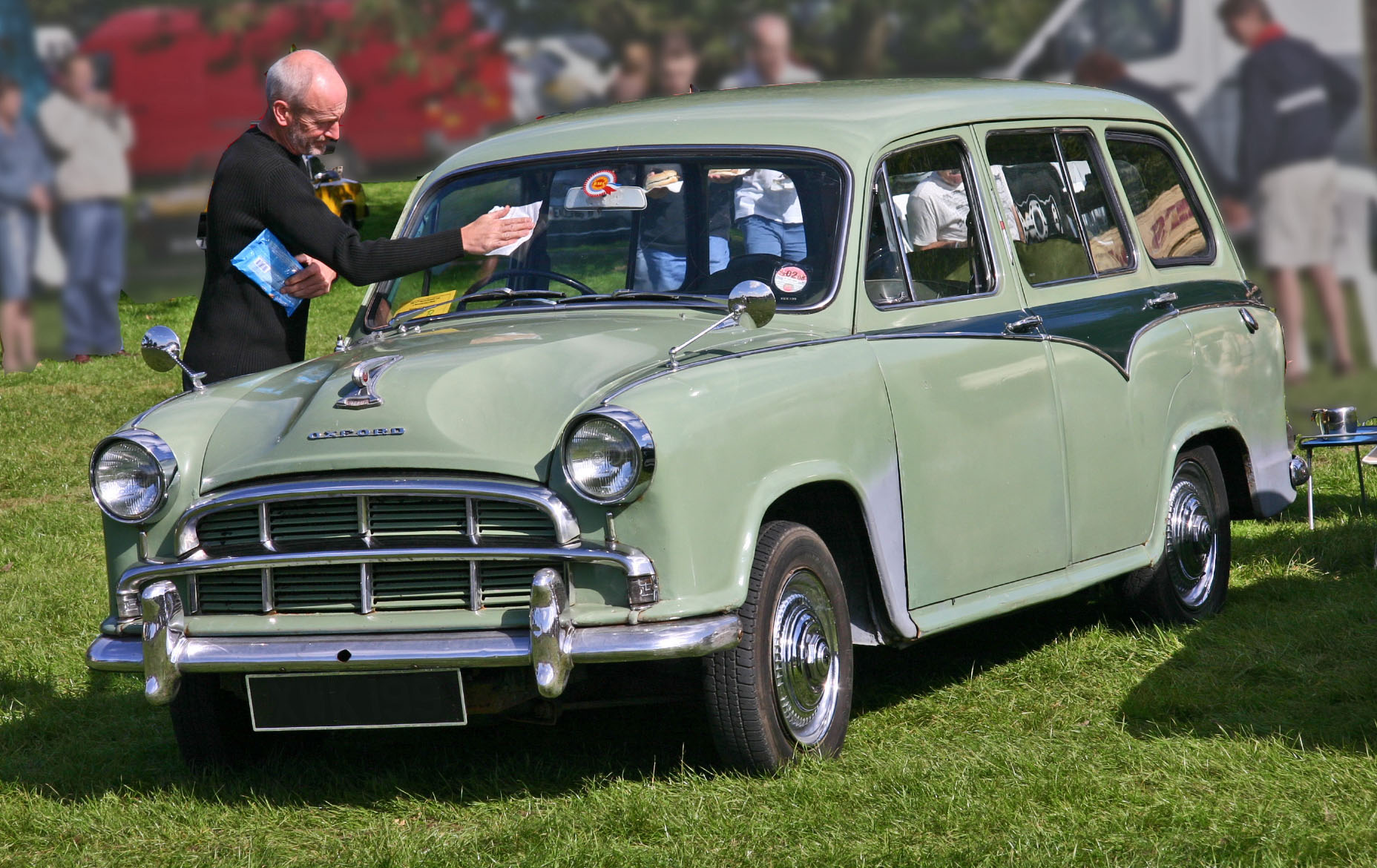
- Oxford Traveller all-steel estate

Overview
- Production: 1957–1960; 58,117 produced inc Series III

Powertrain
- Engine: 1489 cc BMC B-Series engine Straight-4

The Oxford Traveller Series IV was made only as an estate version, it was Morris' first all-steel "unibody" estate car, replacing the "woody" Series III Traveller, it was similar to the Series III saloon in almost all respects. Because it was based on the Series III saloon, but there was already a Series III "Woody" Traveller (also based on the Series III saloon) and there was no Series IV saloon, BMC christened this model the "Morris Oxford Traveller Series IV" the order of wording being so as to emphasise it was a new estate car model. The IV was introduced in 1957 and production continued until April 1960 when the Farina-bodied series V Traveller was available.

Early models were manufactured having a single colour and fitted with a column-change gearbox. When refreshed in 1958 most Travellers were sold with a dual-tone paintwork scheme, although the previous single colour scheme remained available. The update also included a floor change gearbox and corresponding cut-out in the front bench seat to allow its operation..

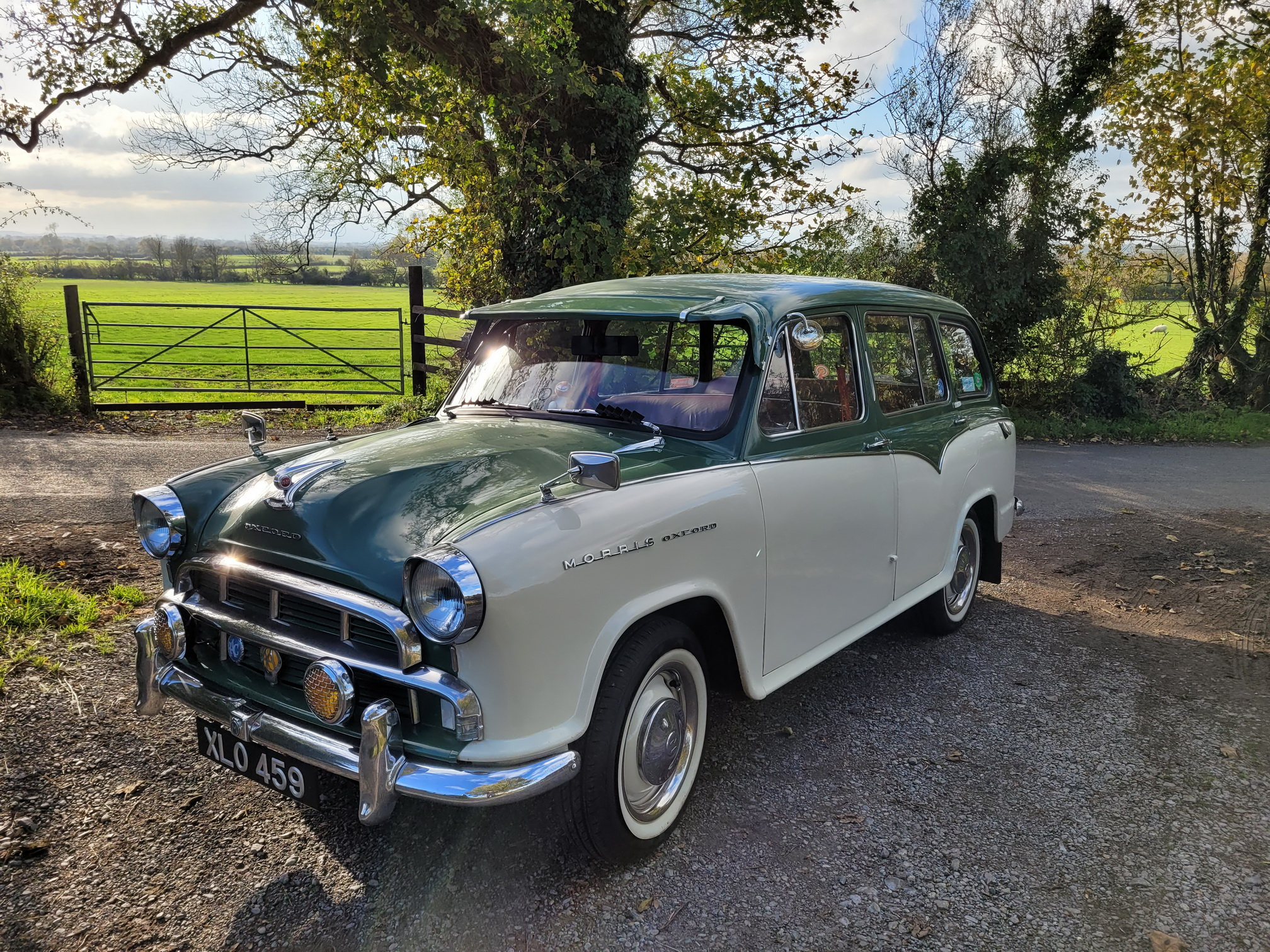
Morris Oxford Traveller Series IV having optional wheel embellishers and sun shade. Somerset 2022

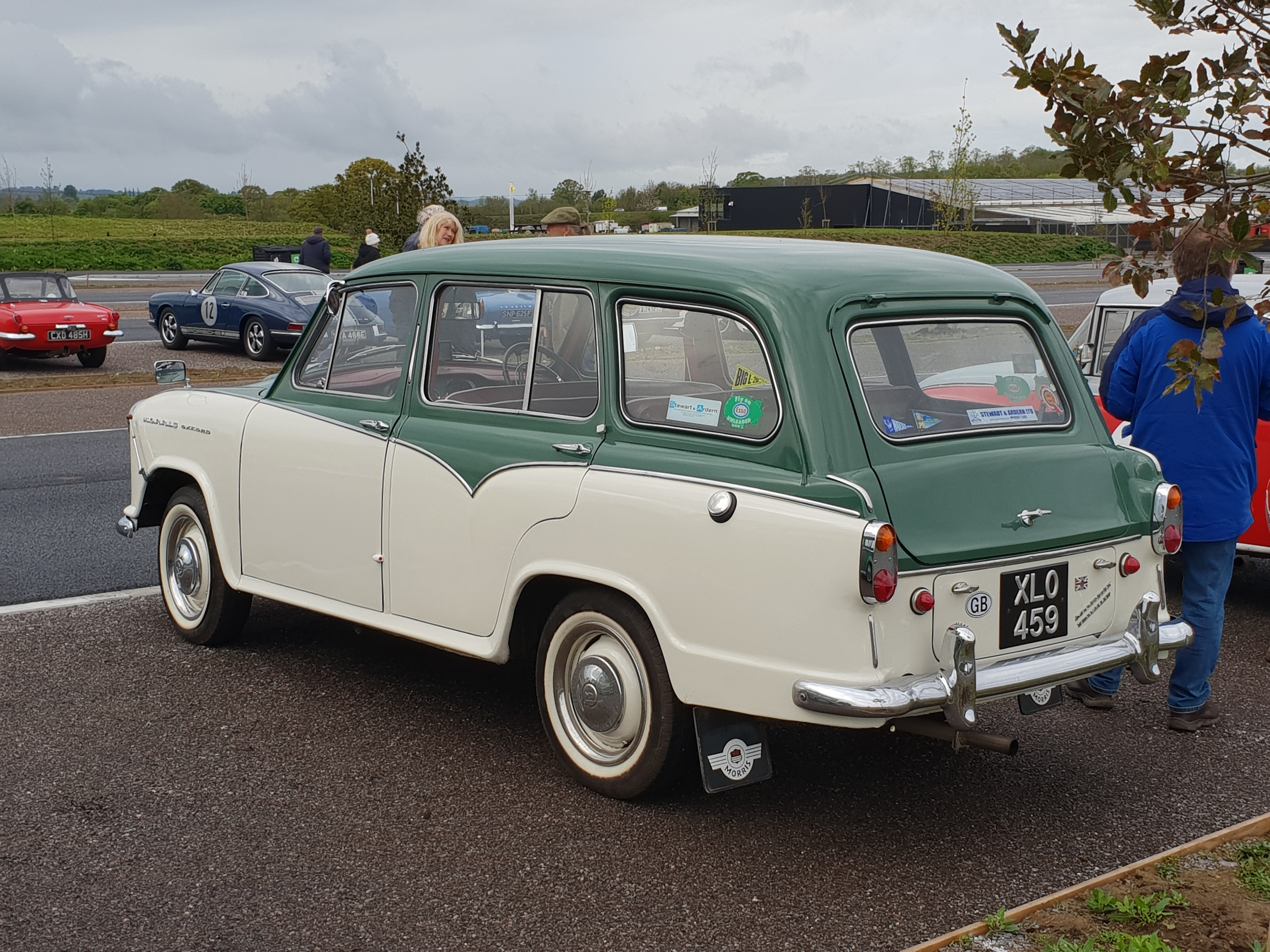
Morris Oxford Series IV Traveller

== Oxford Series V (1959–1961) ==
Oxford Series V
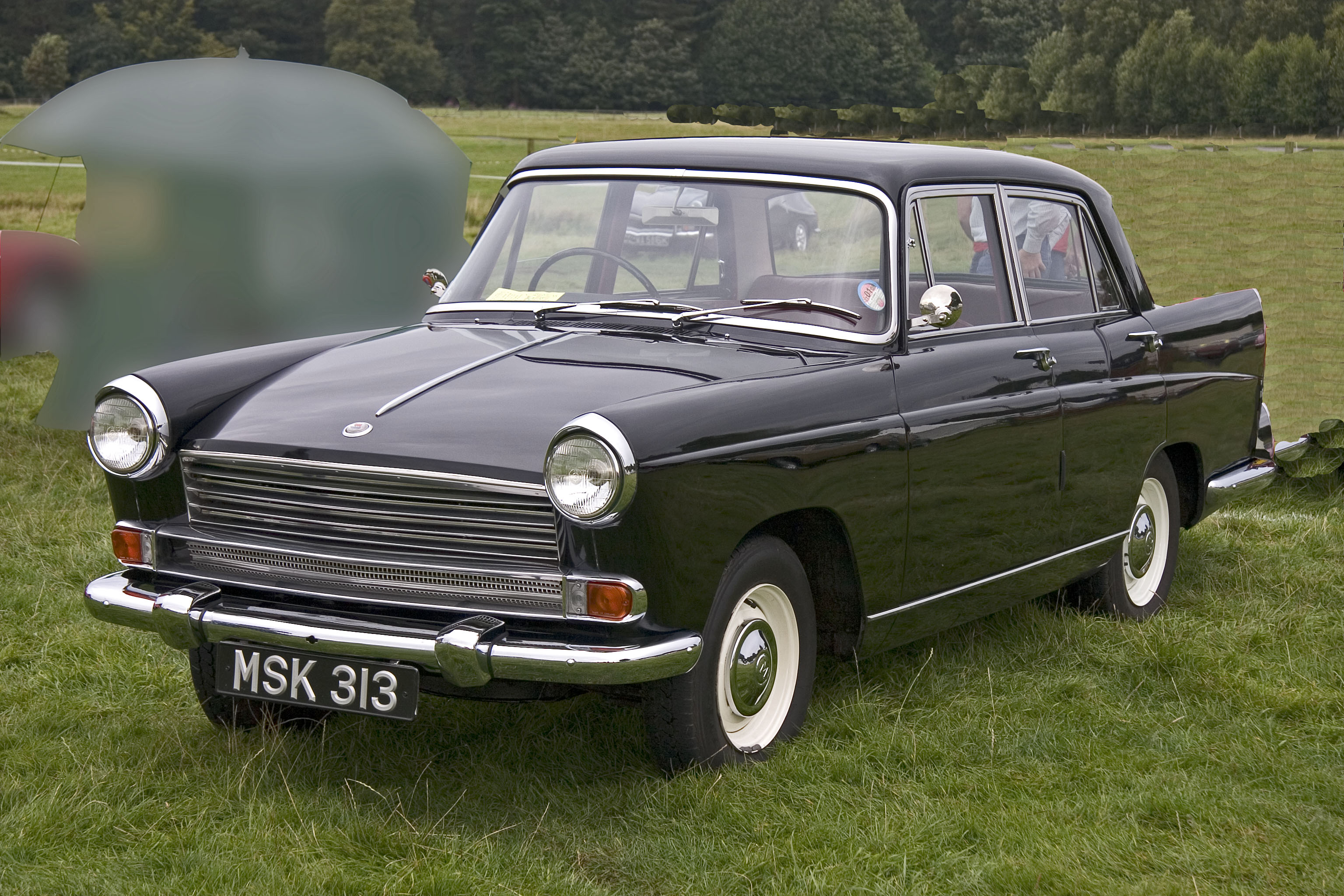
- Oxford Series V

Overview
- Production: 1959–1961; 87,432 produced

Powertrain
- Engine: 1489 cc BMC B-Series engine Straight-4

For 1959, the Oxford, announced on Lady Day 25 March 1959, was merged into the mid-sized Pininfarina-designed BMC Farina range along with a half-dozen other previously announced models, including the 1958 Wolseley 15/60 and 1959 Riley 4/68, Austin A55 Cambridge Mark II, and MG Magnette Mark III. The Series IV Traveller was still sold for the first year after which a Series V Traveller was made.

In all, 87,432 Series V Oxfords were built.

== Oxford Series VI (1961–71) ==
Oxford Series VI
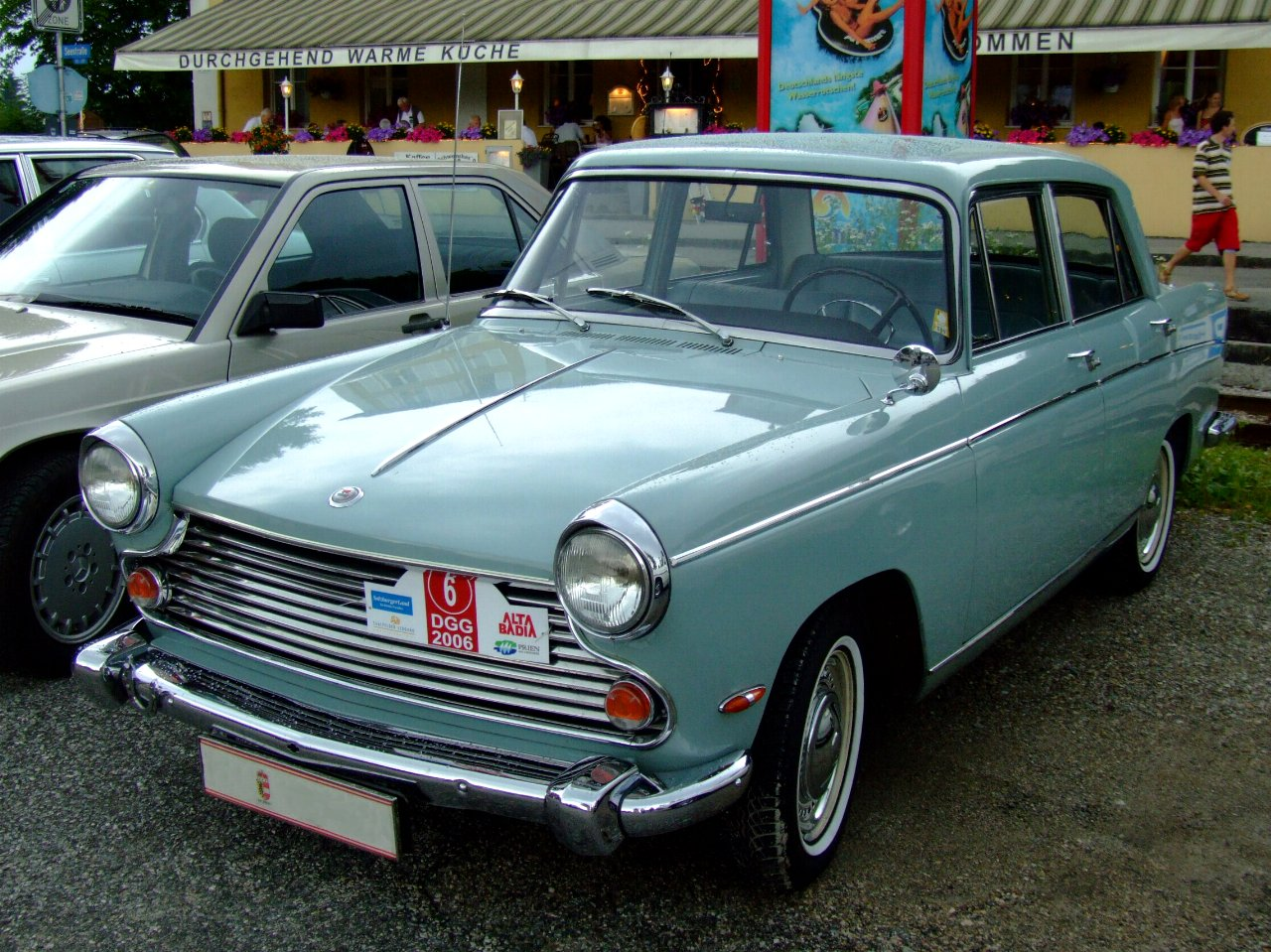
- Oxford Series VI 1965

Overview
- Production: 1961–1971; 208,823 produced

Powertrain
- Engine: 1622 cc BMC B-Series engine Straight-4

Chronology
- Successor: Morris 1800 (ADO17 "Landcrab"); Morris Marina

All five Farina cars were updated in October 1961 with a new 1.6-litre (1622 cc/98 in^{3}) version of the B-Series engine, longer wheelbase and a new revised look. The tail fins had been trimmed and there were still detail changes between the marques. The Morris retained the Series V dash, while the Austin had an all-new fake woodgrain design. The Morris Oxford Traveller (estate) Series V was replaced by a Series VI, although little changed apart from the front grille.

A diesel-engined Oxford Series VI, introduced shortly after the 1961 update, was popular as a taxi. Variants of the same diesel engine enjoyed a long life in marine applications.

The Oxford VI remained in production until 1971 with more than 200,000 produced. The Oxford range was to have been replaced by the 1967 Morris 1800, but in the event was kept going because, in terms both of pricing and of interior space, the 1800 fell into the market segment of a larger car and therefore could not constitute a suitable replacement. The Oxford VI only ceased production on the introduction of the Morris Marina, which also succeeded the smaller Morris Minor.
