= Morris Fourteen =

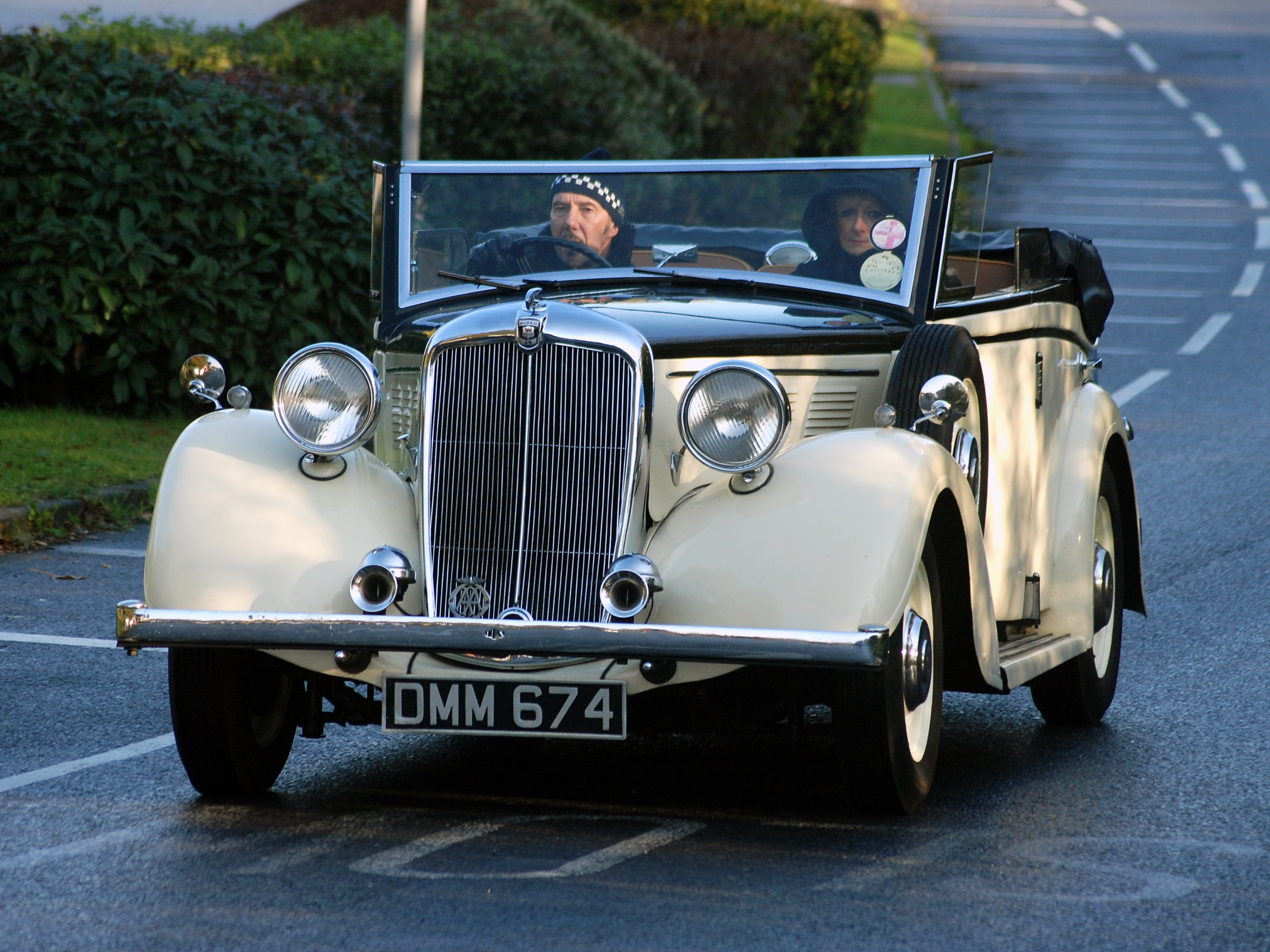
- 1937 Morris 14

Overview
- Manufacturer: Morris Motors Limited
- Production: 1936–1939

The Morris Fourteen is a series of two motor cars that were produced by Morris of the United Kingdom from 1936 until 1939.

== Series II and Series III models ==
=== Morris Fourteen Series II ===
Morris Fourteen Series II
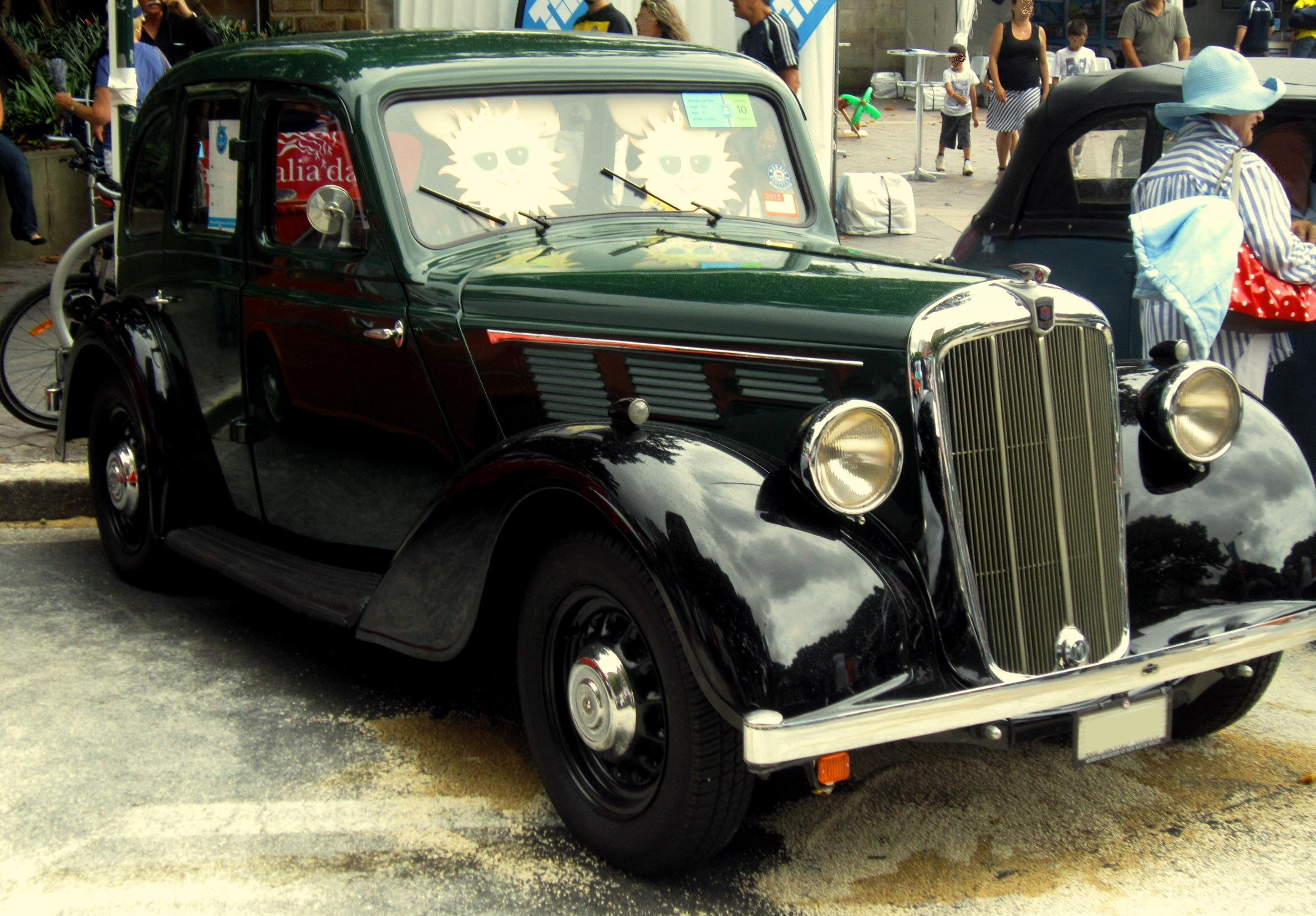
- Morris Fourteen Series II

Overview
- Manufacturer: Morris Motors Limited
- Production: 1936-1937

Body and chassis
- Body style: 4-door saloon

Available as a 4-door saloon, the Fourteen had a Morris QSDM 6-cylinder side-valve engine displacing 1,818cc, and achieving 14.07 hp (RAC). It was available with a 3-speed or 4-speed gearbox.

It was released a year later than the other models (with different engine and body sizes) that were collectively known as the "Series II" Morris range.

=== Morris Fourteen Series III ===
Morris Fourteen Series III
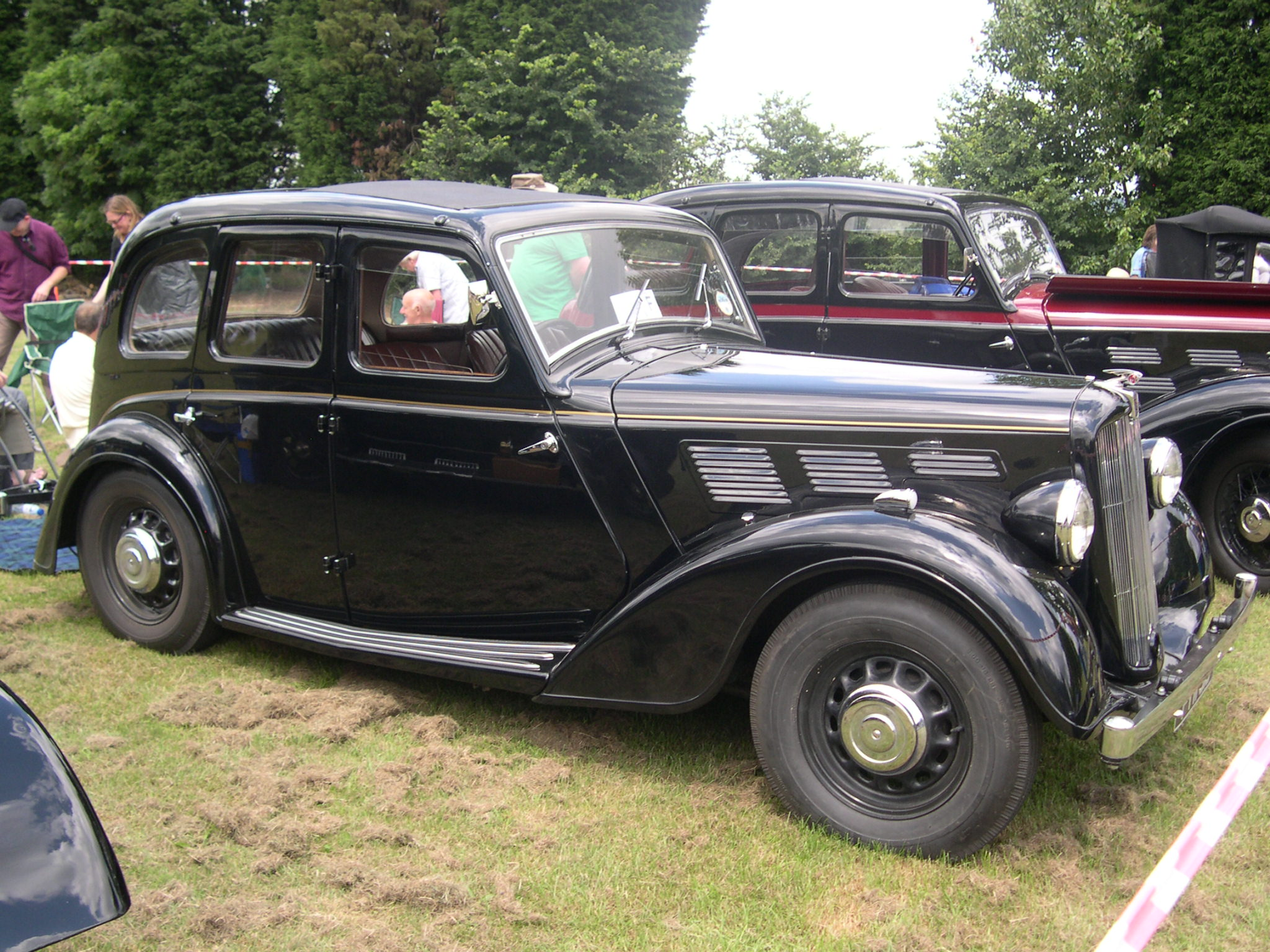
- Morris Fourteen Series III

Overview
- Manufacturer: Morris Motors Limited
- Production: 1938-1939

Body and chassis
- Body style: 4-door saloon

The Fourteen Series III was launched together with the Ten, Twelve, and Twenty Five at the 1937 Motor Show.

The Morris Fourteen Series III is most readily distinguished in having a painted, rather than chromed, radiator cowl — as also happened with its larger sibling, the Morris Twenty-Five.

Another similarity to the Twenty-Five's progression from Series II to Series III is that the engine became an overhead valve unit, while maintaining the same displacement and power as its predecessor.

The Series III also gained covers for its glove compartments.
