= Morris USHM engines =

Family of Morris Motors 918 cc side-valve engines

Morris USHM

Overview
- Manufacturer: Morris Motors
- Production: 1938–1953

Layout
- Configuration: Inline-4, side-valve
- Displacement: 918 cc
- Cylinder bore: 57 mm (nominal)
- Piston stroke: 90 mm (nominal)
- Cylinder block material: Cast iron
- Cylinder head material: Cast iron
- Valvetrain: Side-valve (flathead)

Combustion
- Fuel system: SU carburettor (typical)
- Fuel type: Petrol
- Cooling system: Thermosyphon or water pump

Output
- Power output: 29 bhp (22 kW) @ 4,000 rpm (typical)

The Morris USHM engine series was a family of 918 cc inline-four side-valve petrol engines produced by Morris Motors from the late 1930s until the early 1950s. They were developed from the earlier UB-series engine and were fitted to the Morris Eight (Series E) and early Morris Minor (Series MM), as well as used in auxiliary and stationary roles.

Three main variants (USHM1, USHM2 and USHM3) were produced, differing mainly in their cooling, lubrication, and ancillary fittings.

== Background ==
The USHM engine was introduced in 1938 with the Morris Eight Series E. It represented a refinement of the UB 918 cc side-valve unit, providing smoother operation and slightly higher output (≈29 bhp). After the Second World War the engine was retained for the newly launched Morris Minor in 1948, continuing until the adoption of the overhead-valve A-series engine in 1953.

== Variants ==
Variant	Period / applications	Key features
USHM1	1938–1948, Morris Eight Series E	Simplest form; thermosyphon cooling only, no oil filter, vertical water outlet on cylinder head.
USHM2	1948–1950, early Morris Minor MM	Some provision for oil filter; cooling still thermosyphon; dynamo mounted to cylinder head.
USHM3	1950–1953, later Minor MM	Incorporates oil filter, thermostat housing, optional front water pump; revised head and water jacket castings with dynamo attached to water jacket casting.

Many internal components (crankshaft, pistons, rods, camshaft) were interchangeable across the USHM series.

== Technical specifications (typical) ==
- Configuration: Inline-4, side-valve
- Displacement: 918 cc
- Power: ~29 bhp (22 kW)
- Cooling: Thermosyphon (early) or water pump (later)
- Lubrication: Splash/pressure feed; later units with oil filter
- Electrical system: 6 volt, dynamo driven
- Fuel system: SU carburettor

== Applications ==
- Automobiles
  - Morris Eight Series E (1938–1948)
  - Morris Minor MM (1948–1953)
- Auxiliary uses
  - Adapted as an auxiliary power unit in British tanks such as the Centurion, Conqueror, and Chieftain.
