= Durable Car Company =

Sri Lankan car company

The Durable Car Company was established in 1992 in Bataduwa, near Galle, Sri Lanka, to manufacture spare parts for Morris Minor cars.

== History ==
The company was set up by Dhanapala Samarasekara, a retired, Sri Lankan diplomat. The motivation for its establishment stemmed from Dhanapala's ecological concerns and his love for his country. He saw that the Morris Minor was a sustainable means of transport and starting a factory to build parts in his home town, Galle, would also boost employment in the area. Due to sheer serendipity, Dhanapala, whilst flicking through the UK broadsheets, stumbled upon an article featuring Charles Ware, owner of Britain's Morris Minor Company, and a relationship was forged between the two, whereby Morris Minor parts would be made in Sri Lanka by Dhanapala's team and sent to UK for Charles' for assembly.

In the period after the Morris Minor was launched in 1948, the vast majority were exported, in particularly throughout the British Empire. Production ceased in 1970, but it is estimated that at least 4,000 of them are still on the road in Sri Lanka. At the same time Sri Lanka, though suffering from high unemployment, possessed a skilled workforce. Creating a factory using appropriate technology would contribute to conservation and local development, and be consistent with Buddhist value of environmental protection.

The factory was opened 1991 in the presence of British High Commissioner David Gladstone, himself a Morris Minor owner. It eventually manufactured a range of over 80 parts for Morris Minors, predominantly chassis and interior body parts, which did not require sophisticated technologies. Its products were exported to the UK by air freight.

The business plan was to manufacture at first single parts, then expand into sub-assemblies, then entire body shells. The firm also reconditioned local cars. The factory started with 50 employees, and aimed to employ 1,000 people within 4 years, training them in metalworking skills. However this projected growth did not take place and the workforce gradually fell to 12. Eventually, the DCC was dissolved prior to Dhanapala's death in 2015 due to lack of funds. The equipment and land where the company formerly stood were sold.

== External sources ==
- Charles Smith (1994) Economic Development, Growth and Welfare, p. 93, box 6.2. London, Palgrave, 978-0-333-59268-7
- Morris Minor Centre page on DCC: https://www.morrisminor.org.uk/62-sri-lanka
- Daily Telegraph article by Paul Jeffries, 17 Oct 2013: https://www.telegraph.co.uk/motoring/classiccars/10372863/Morris-Minor-still-big-in-Sri-Lanka.html
- The Businessman, The Buddhist and the Morris Minor, film on development of Durable Car Company: https://www.youtube.com/watch?v=qIFRr71Z7OI
