= Morris Twelve =

Morris Twelve Four or 12
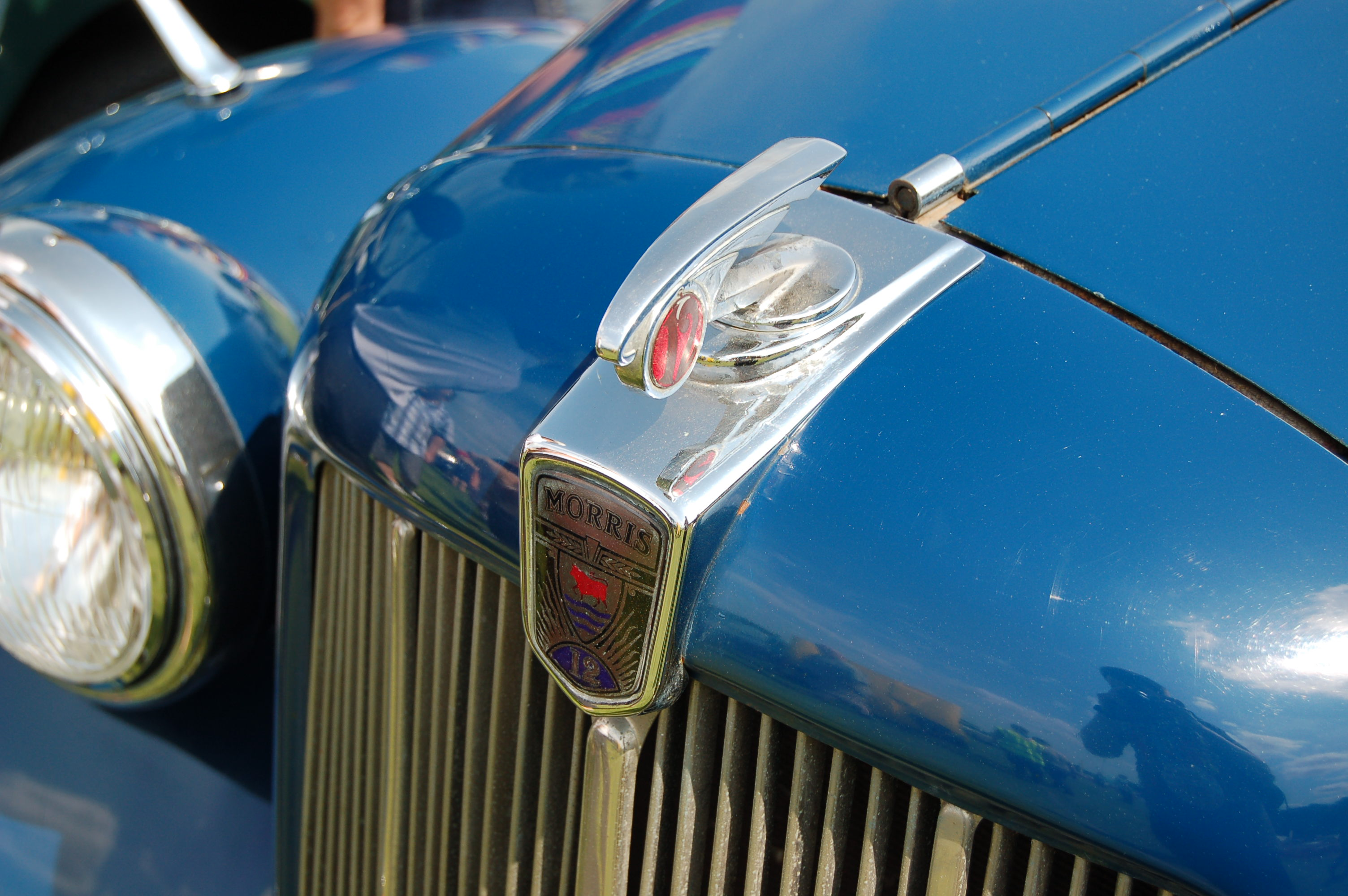
- Badges of a March 1939 registered series III saloon

Overview
- Manufacturer: Morris Motors Limited

Morris Twelve is a model of Morris car introduced without fanfare in the autumn of 1934 as little more than a larger engined Morris Ten Four for which just another £5 was asked. The chassis and body were of the slow-selling longer wheelbase Ten Six. The engine though awarded a tax rating of 11.98 hp had a cubic capacity of 1548cc compared with Morris's 1292cc (10 hp) Ten Four and 1378cc (12.09 hp) Ten Six.

This resulted from the vagaries of the Treasury's tax rating formula which took no account of the length of the engine's stroke. Very long stroke engines like the Twelve's provided good low speed torque at the expense of reliability at higher rpm. Such engines were unable to make full use of better fuels and the improved engine breathing techniques that were coming available. Morris briefly promoted the series II car with the note that it performed just like a 14 horsepower car but that brought about a clash from the summer of 1936 when Morris began to supply a six-cylinder 1818cc Morris Fourteen.

While both this new Twelve and the Ten variant Ten Six models appeared in the Morris catalogue for 1935 the slow selling Ten Six was soon dropped. The Twelve remained in production until war intervened and was replaced after the war by the 1476cc but 13½ horsepower Morris Oxford MO.

Each new model showed further integration of the structure of chassis and body. The post-war replacement, Morris Oxford MO, was close to full unitary construction.

== Morris Twelve Four ==
Morris Twelve Four
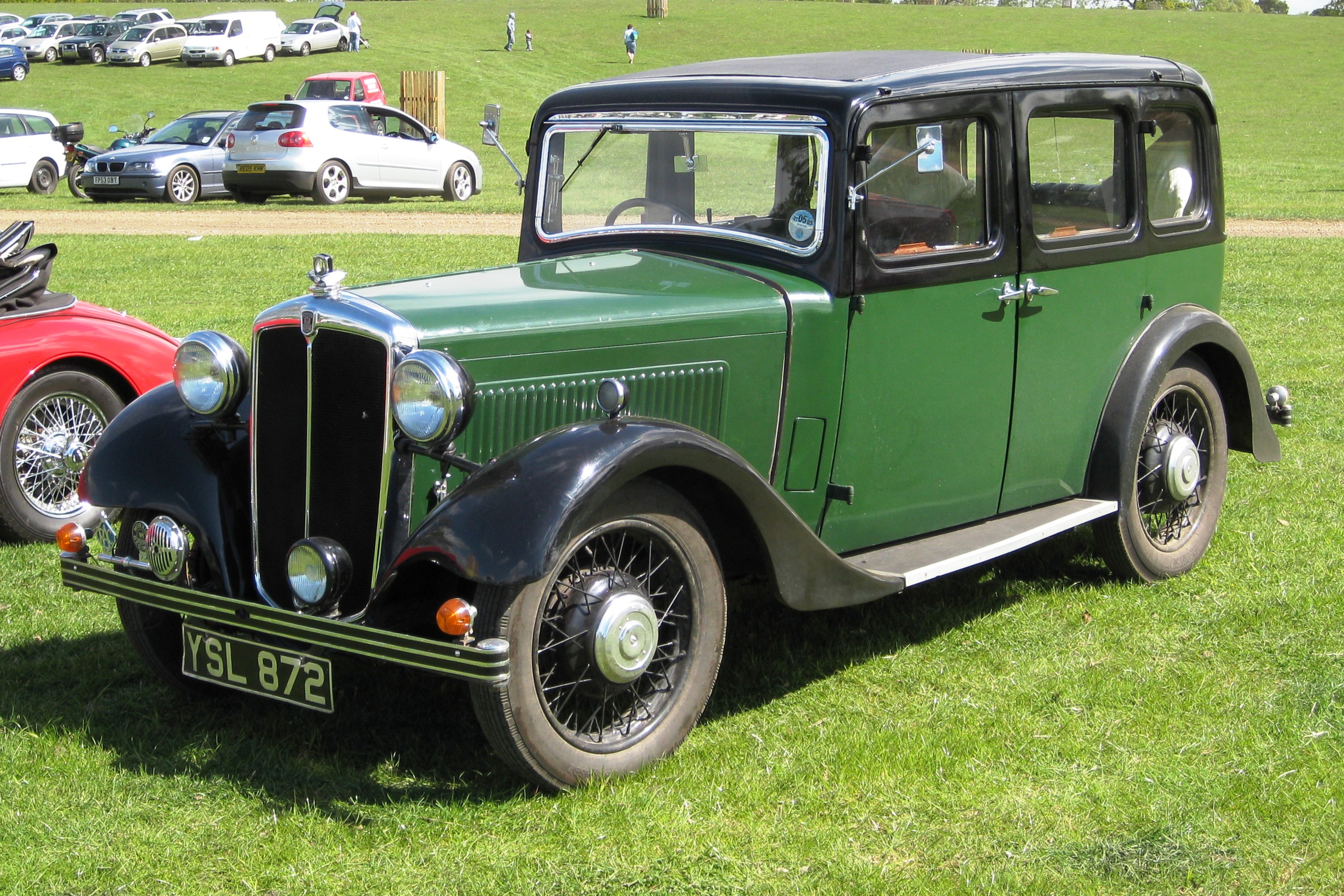
- Twelve Four six-light saloon registered December 1934

Overview
- Manufacturer: Morris Motors Limited

Body and chassis
- Body style: 4-door 4-seater saloon with a "fixed head" or "sliding head" aka "sunshine roof"; Chassis only (for own coachwork)
- Layout: front engine rear wheel drive
- Platform: separate chassis frame with X stiffening members

Powertrain
- Engine: 1548cc side-valve in-line four cylinder
- Transmission: four-speed gearbox with synchromesh; single plate clutch with cork inserts lubricated from the crankcase; Spicer tubular propeller shaft with needle type universal joints takes the drive to the silent spiral bevel final drive. The back axle is of the three-quarter floating type

Dimensions
- Wheelbase: 2,590.8 mm (102.0 in) 8' 6" track 1,219.2 mm (48.0 in) 4' 0"
- Length: 3,962.4 mm (156.0 in)
- Width: 1,562.1 mm (61.5 in)
- Height: 1,701.8 mm (67.0 in)

Chronology
- Predecessor: Morris Cowley
- Successor: series II

The Morris Twelve Four appeared in the autumn of 1934, probably overshadowed by the promotion of the new model Morris Eight. It was also after three years when it had been sold as a Morris Cowley. When named Cowley it had been available with the Oxford's 1802cc engine as well as the 1548cc engine.

This Twelve shared much with Morris's 1292cc Ten Four and 1378cc Ten Six using the Ten Four gearbox and ratios but with wider wheels and larger section tyres than either of the smaller-engined cars and it used, with modifications, the wheelbase of the Ten Six which was six inches more than the Ten Four. The wheelbase was almost an inch longer than the Ten Six. It also had a fuel tank which held a gallon more than either of the other cars.

=== Brakes suspension steering ===
Lockheed hydraulic brakes were fitted on all four wheels, the handbrake on the rear wheels using a mechanical linkage. Suspension was by long semi-elliptic springs at front and rear with Armstrong hydraulic shock absorbers. Steering was by Bishop Cam.

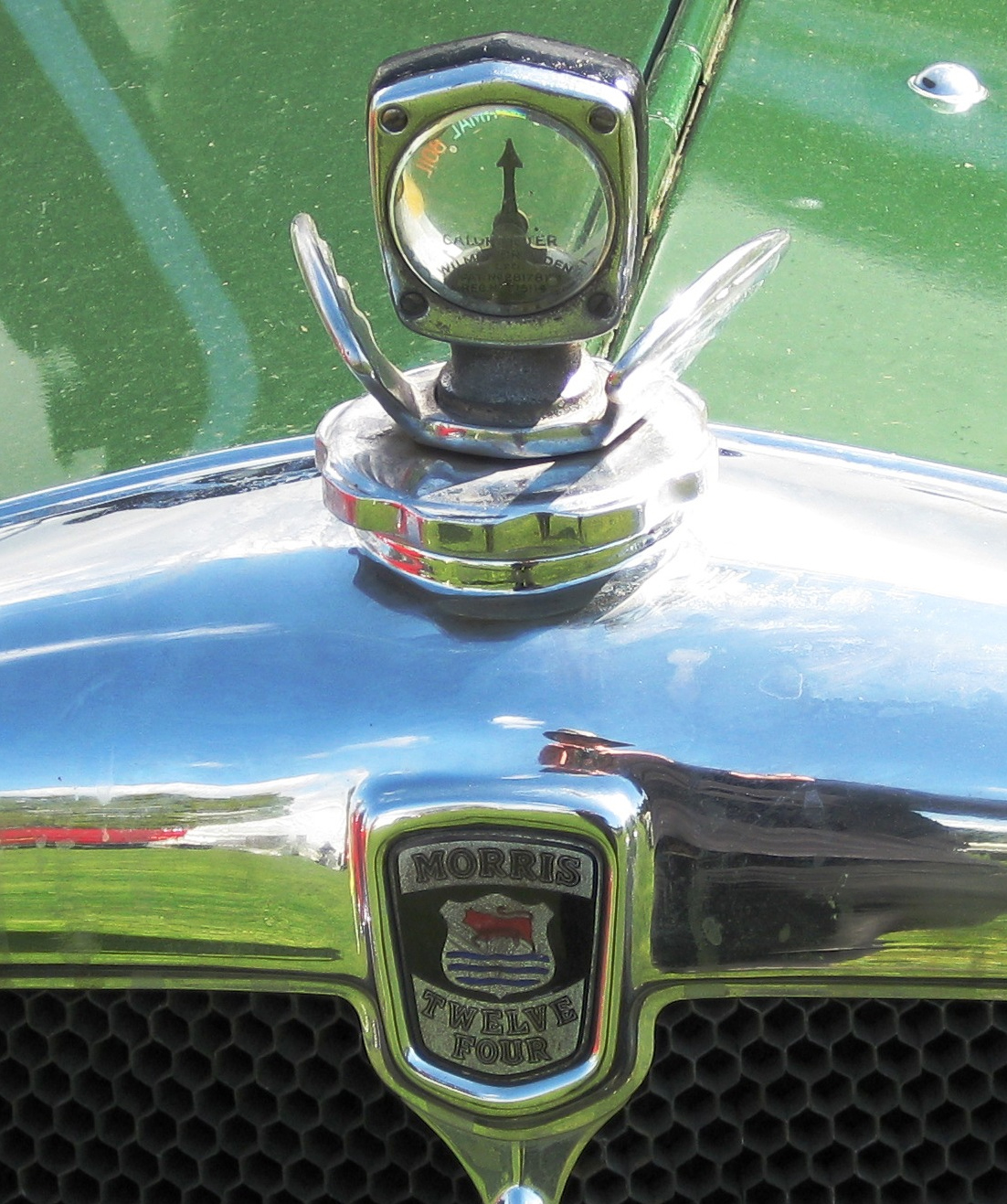

Morris 12 Flathead

Overview
- Manufacturer: Morris Engines Limited

Layout
- Configuration: in-line four
- Displacement: 1548cc, 94.59 ci
- Cylinder bore: 69.5 mm, 2.73 in
- Piston stroke: 102 mm, 4.01 in
- Cylinder block material: cast in one with the skirt of the crankcase; three-bearing crankshaft; low-expansion aluminium alloy pistons, connecting rods steel
- Cylinder head material: detachable
- Valvetrain: side by side valves are operated by three-bearing camshaft; drive to the camshaft is by silent duplex roller chain

Combustion
- Fuel system: single SU carburettor with air cleaner and silencer and automatic electric fuel pump
- Fuel type: petrol
- Oil system: a spur gear pump driven from the camshaft pushes oil to main and big-end bearings, camshaft bearings and valve gear from a reservoir in the sump
- Cooling system: water circulated by centrifugal impeller and with thermostatic control

Output
- Power output: Treasury rating 11.98hp

Chronology
- Predecessor: Morris 12

== Morris 12 series II ==
Morris 12 series II
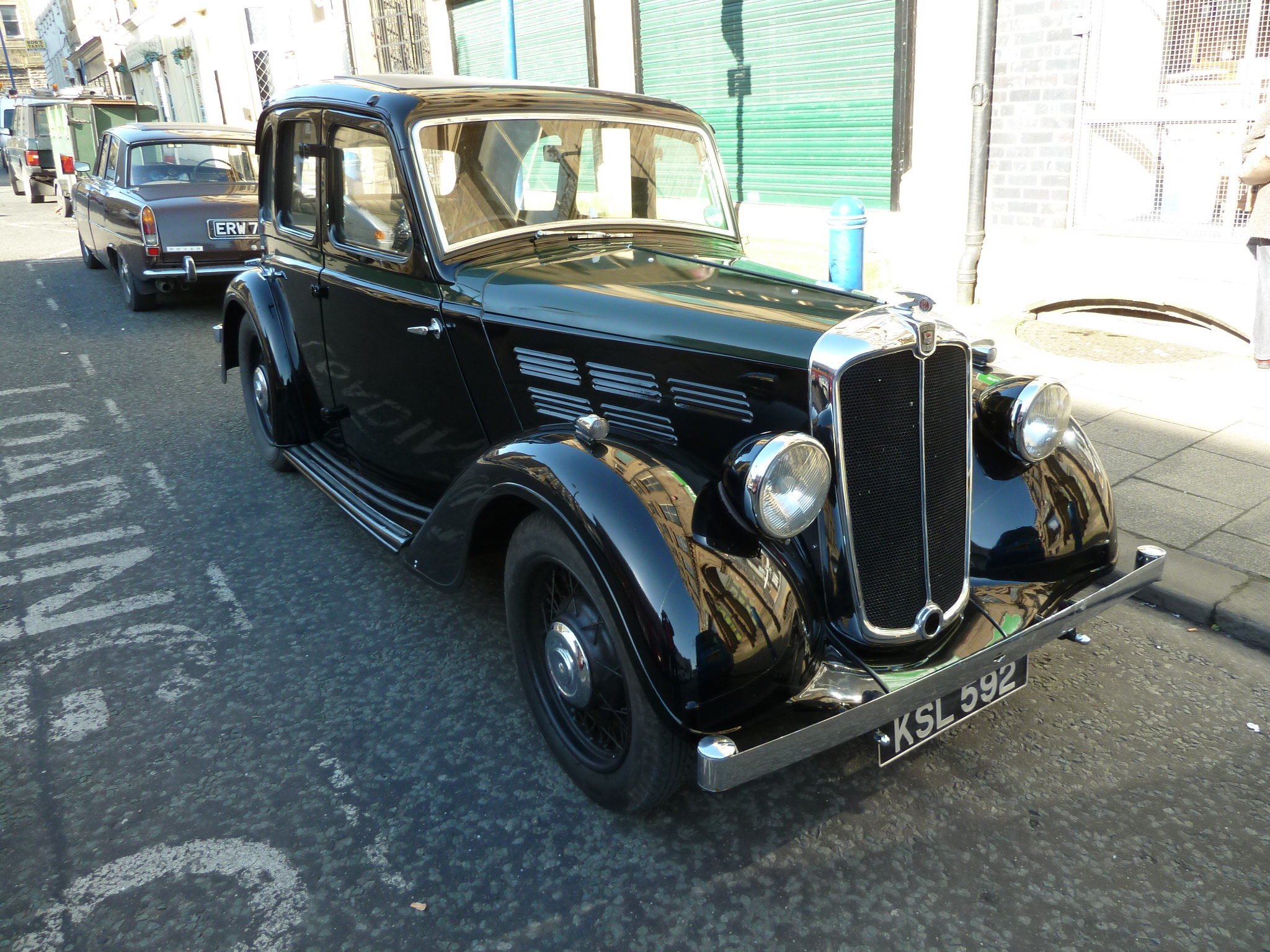
- series II six-light saloon 1935 with Magna (wire) wheels

Overview
- Manufacturer: Morris Motors Limited

Body and chassis
- Body style: 4-door 4-seater saloon with a "fixed head" or "sliding head" aka "sunshine roof"; 2-door Special coupé; Chassis only (for own coachwork)
- Layout: front engine rear wheel drive
- Platform: body and chassis together form a rigid structure incorporating the body flooring as part of the chassis structure
- Related: Morris Ten

Powertrain
- Engine: 1548cc side valve inline four cylinder
- Transmission: three-speed gearbox with synchromesh on 2nd and top gears; single plate clutch with cork inserts lubricated from the crankcase; Spicer tubular propeller shaft with needle type universal joints takes the drive to the silent spiral bevel final drive. The back axle is of the three-quarter floating type; Four-speed gearbox optional from November 1936; Four-speed box standardised end February 1937

Dimensions
- Wheelbase: 2,540 mm (100.0 in) 8' 4" track 1,270 mm (50.0 in) 4' 2"
- Length: 4,191 mm (165.0 in)
- Width: 1,549.4 mm (61.0 in)
- Height: 1,625.6 mm (64.0 in); Special coupé 1,600 mm (63.0 in)
- Kerb weight: 2,296 kg (5,062 lb) 20 cwt 2 qr

Chronology
- Predecessor: Twelve
- Successor: series III

Series II was announced on Friday 17 May 1935 along with a new Ten Four as a kind of extra note tagged to the main Ten Four display advertisement - "You can have a twelve horsepower model for £5 extra".

The series II came with a new longer and lower body with all passengers seated within the wheelbase, narrow windscreen pillars and wide windscreen. Special construction of the body and frame bolted together was designed to produce a strong double box section. New built in luggage accommodation at the rear of the body was accessible by lifting the rear seat's hinged backrest, the previous Twelve had no covered luggage space. An external folding luggage grid was continued from the last car to cope with any extra luggage. The, new to the Twelve, Special coupé continued to have its special inbuilt luggage container. New instrumentation for the driver included an enlarged speedometer. Direction indicators were now concealed within the body and controlled from the steering wheel and given a driver's warning light in the centre of the wheel. The pedals were now mounted directly to the frame (chassis) and free from vibration.

A new three-speed synchromesh gearbox was fitted along with standard Jackall built-in hydraulic jacks and Magna wired wheels. (A 3-speed gearbox produced at least a 25% reduction in anxiety level for most drivers. Suburban streets shivered to the sound of grating gears in pre-synchromesh gearboxes). Easy-clean pressed steel wheels with six-stud fixing became available, initially as an option but in either case they carried 5.75—16 extra low pressure tyres of a smaller section than the previous model. A spare wheel with its tyre was carried in a sunken panel on the back of the car and a steel cover was supplied for it on the dearer sliding head model which also carried toughened glass in its side and rear windows.

Electrical fittings now included a single acting foot-operated switch to dip the headlights and raise them when pressed again. A single electric windscreen wiper mounted on the lower screen rail was supplied to provide clear forward vision in poor weather

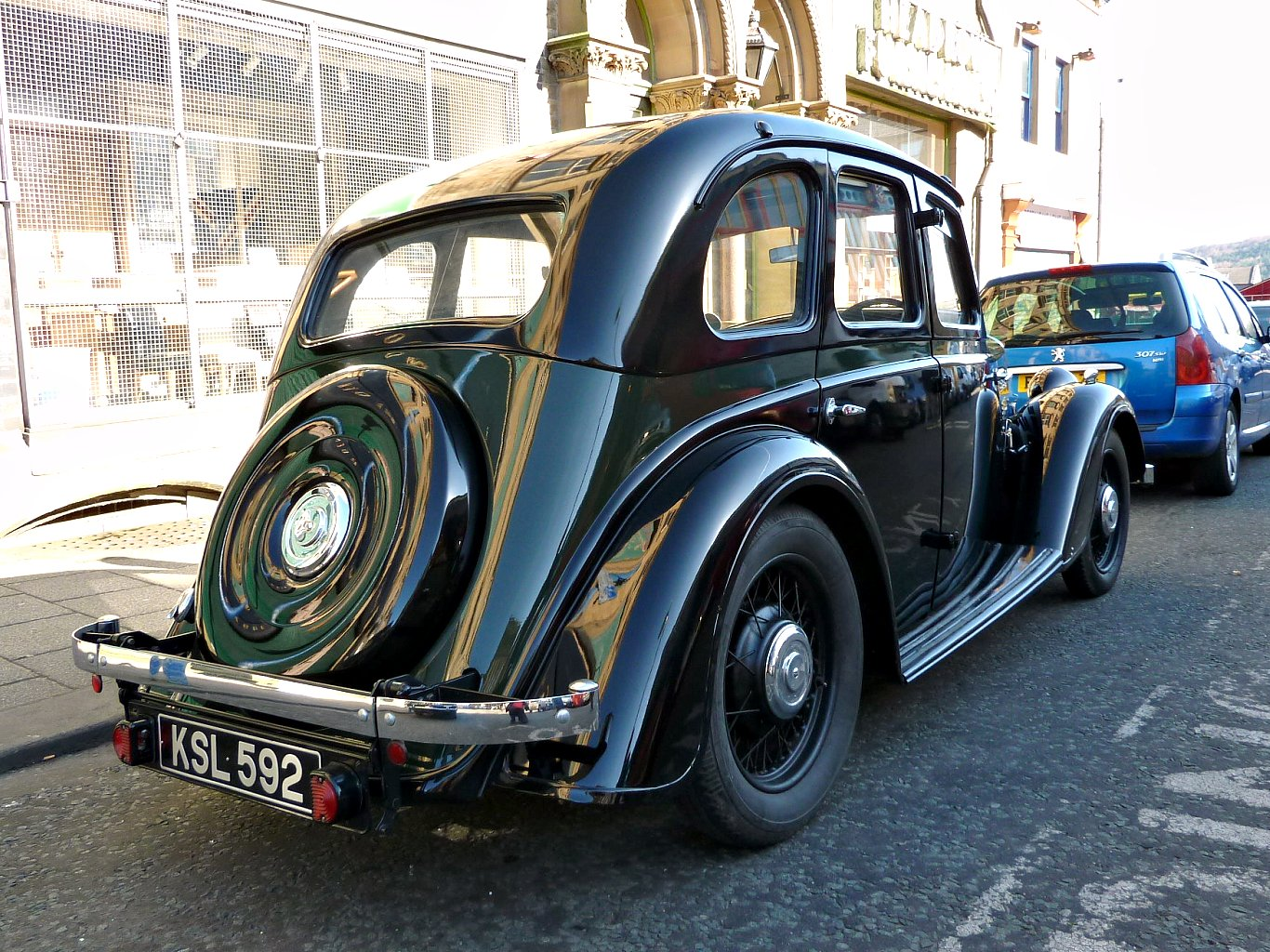

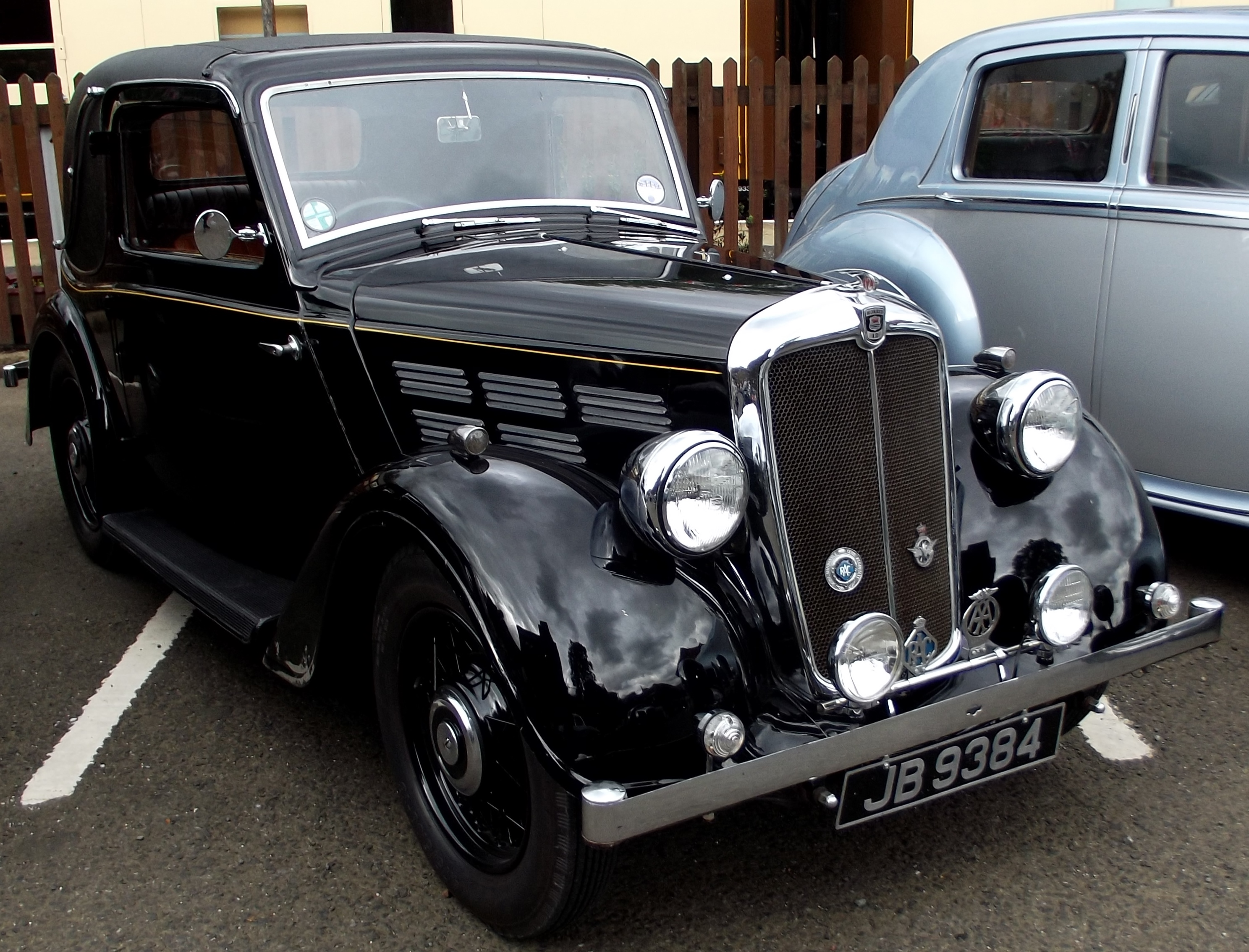
Special coupé

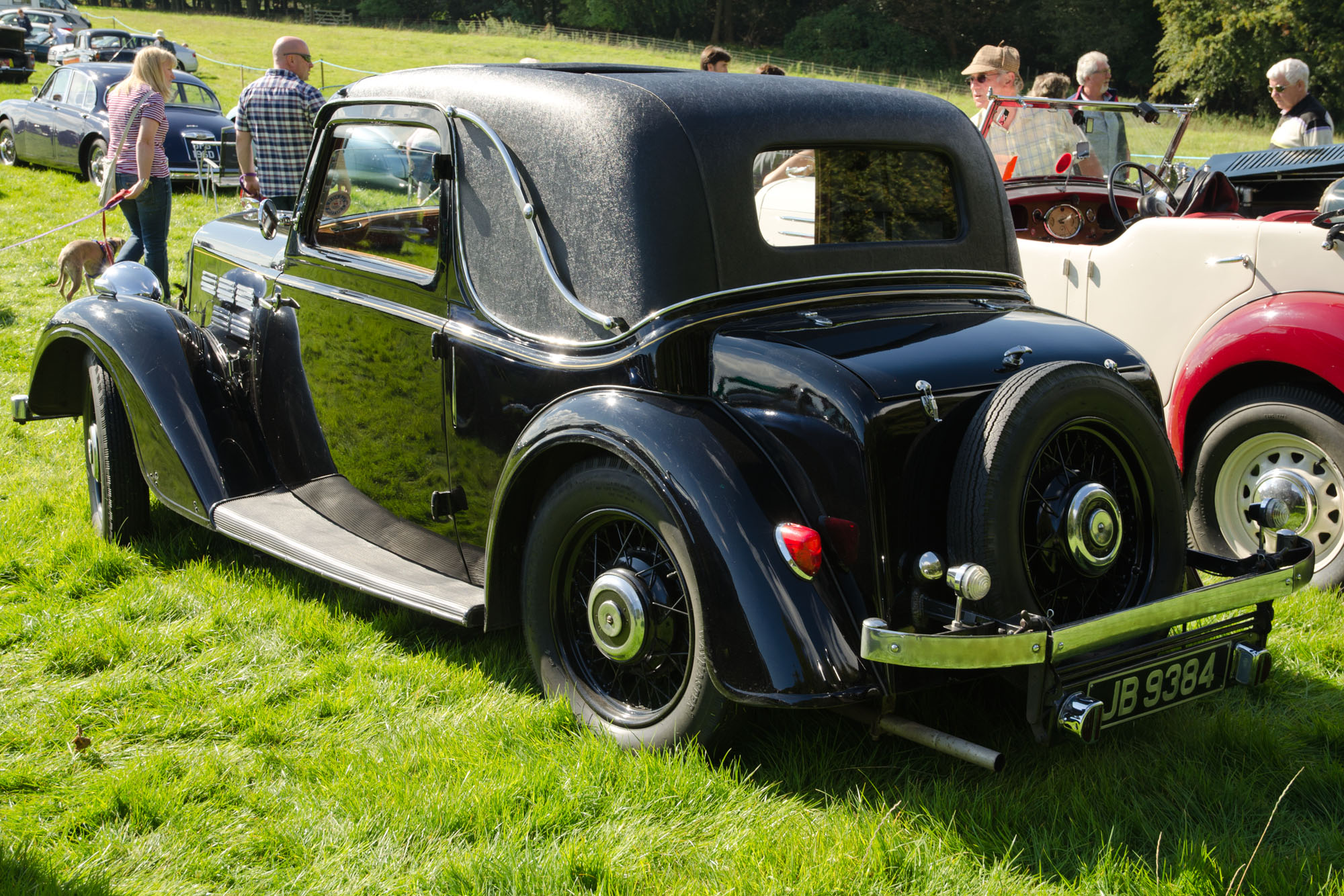

Morris 12 Flathead

Overview
- Manufacturer: Morris Engines Limited

Layout
- Configuration: in-line four
- Displacement: 1548cc, 94.59 ci
- Cylinder bore: 69.5 mm, 2.73 in
- Piston stroke: 102 mm, 4.01 in
- Cylinder block material: cast in one with the skirt of the crankcase; three-bearing crankshaft; low-expansion aluminium alloy pistons, connecting rods steel
- Cylinder head material: detachable
- Valvetrain: side by side valves are operated by three-bearing camshaft; drive to the camshaft is by silent duplex roller chain

Combustion
- Fuel system: single SU carburettor with air cleaner and silencer and automatic electric fuel pump
- Fuel type: petrol
- Oil system: a spur gear pump driven from the camshaft pushes oil to main and big-end bearings, camshaft bearings and valve gear from a reservoir in the sump
- Cooling system: water circulated by centrifugal impeller and with thermostatic control

Output
- Power output: Treasury rating 11.98hp

Chronology
- Predecessor: Morris 12

Following the 1936 annual Motor Show when no new variations were offered (No Change for Olympia) Morris inserted large display advertisements offering to buyers of all their cars bigger than the Morris Eight a choice of:

- 3-speed gearbox and Jackall hydraulic jacks
- or 4-speed gearbox without Jackall hydraulic jacks
- or 4-speed gearbox with Jackall hydraulic jacks at £5 extra

Easyclean wheels optional without extra cost

Three months after they had been first offered as an option —during which 92% of buyers chose the four-speed gearbox— the four-speed gearbox was made standard equipment.

=== Road test ===
The Times' testers said "the four-door six-light body offers ample space for four large persons, neither elbow nor leg room being cramped, there is unusually good headroom." They also reported that passengers were given a high view useful when touring. Entrance to the front seats was regarded as very fair and it was noted that it was possible for the driver to slide in from the near-side. The restricted entrance behind, unless the seats were slid forward, was noted. The whole car's exterior was viewed as "tidy looking" and easy clean wheels were thought to help that attractive appearance. The back axle, it was complained, produced a light hum.

== Morris 12 series III ==
Morris 12 series III
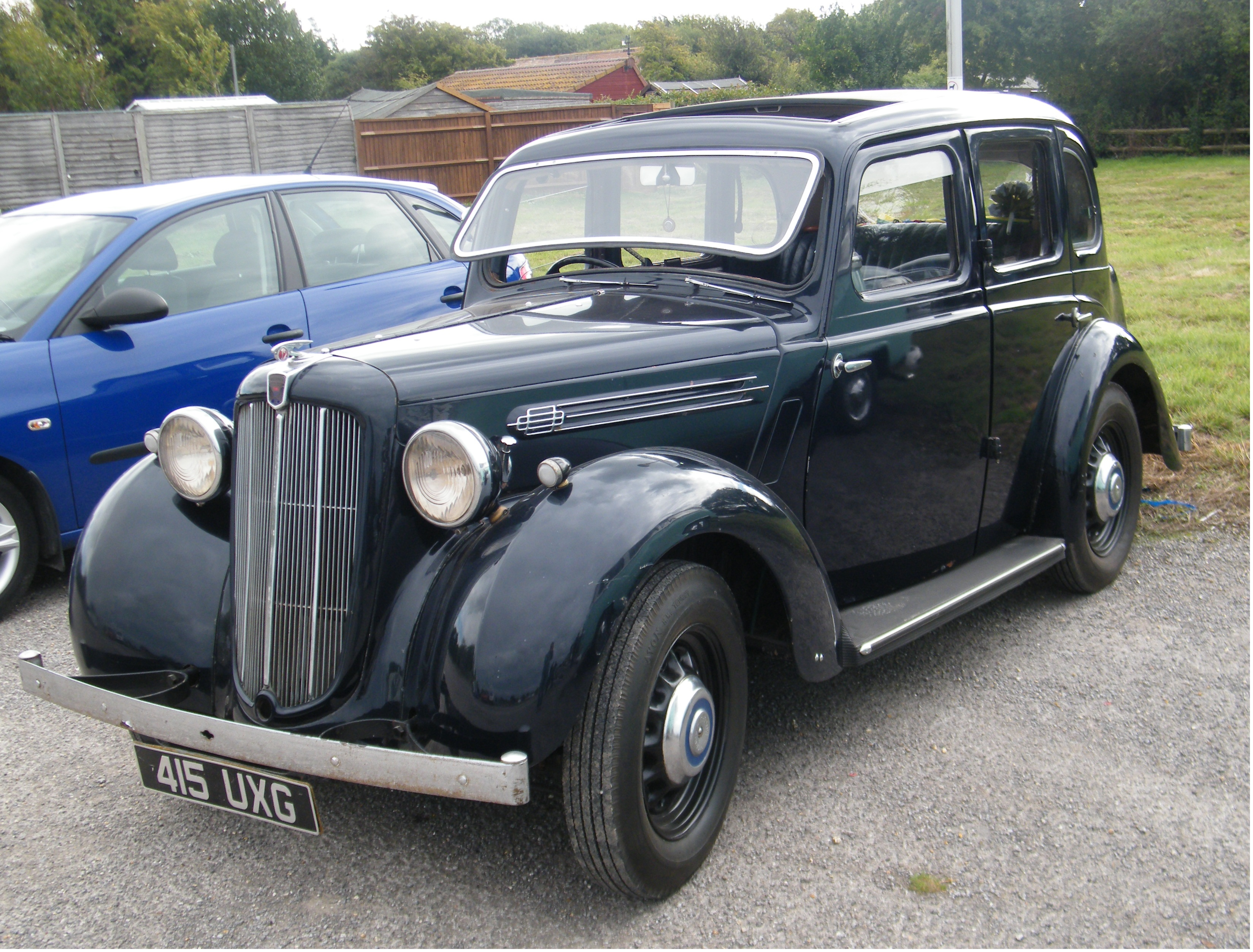
- 12/4 series III six-light saloon, windscreen ajar registered December 1937

Overview
- Manufacturer: Morris Motors Limited
- Model years: 1938 to 1939

Body and chassis
- Body style: 4-door 4-seater saloon with a "fixed head" or "sliding head" aka "sunshine roof"; Chassis only (for own coachwork)
- Platform: double box section frame the second box within the body structure and bolted to the frame, box section scuttle

Powertrain
- Engine: 1548cc overhead valve inline four cylinder
- Transmission: four-speed gearbox with synchromesh on 2, 3 and 4th gears; single dry-plate clutch; Spicer tubular propeller shaft with needle type universal joints takes the drive to the silent spiral bevel final drive. The back axle is three-quarter floating with a one-piece banjo

Dimensions
- Wheelbase: 2,438 mm (96.0 in) 8' 0" track 1,270 mm (50.0 in) 4' 2"
- Length: 4,064 mm (160.0 in) 160"
- Width: not supplied
- Height: 1,651 mm (65.0 in) 65"
- Kerb weight: 1,130.4 kg (2,492 lb) 22¼ cwt

Chronology
- Successor: Morris Oxford MO announced 1948

Announced 20 August 1937

A new booted shape with better seating and a new engine was announced in August 1937 and designated series III. The electrical system was now 12-volt. The engine had been introduced to power the Wolseley 12/48 and the MG VA in October 1936 though that did not enter production until mid 1937.

Badged Morris 12 but described in its early brochures as The Morris Twelve-Four (series III) its major advances on the previous 12 were the overhead valve engine, more rounded edges for the shorter smoother new body on a smaller wheelbase and now it had a real boot with outside access to any luggage it held. This new container's nearly ten cubic feet might be amplified by leaving the lid open which then formed a luggage rack. The spare wheel with its tyre was now carried independently below the luggage compartment and fully enclosed. The four-speed gearbox had been given better synchromesh and silent helical type gears for second third and top. Aside from the transmission tunnel the floor was now quite flat without footwells.

Easy-clean pressed steel wheels carried extra low pressure 5.50—16 tyres of a slightly smaller section than previously. Useful conveniences included clearer instrumentation, self-cancelling trafficators and now twin windscreen wipers with remote silent drive and independent operation. There was an automatically actuated stoplight at the back of the car.

Particular care had been taken to ensure draught-free ventilation by scuttle ventilators and hinged rear quarter-lights. The windscreen was hinged at the top for clearer sheltered wet-weather unmisted vision after dark. The front windows were fitted with louvres and, when open, the windows provided an extractor effect at their rear edge. The steering was by Bishop Cam. The rigid axle suspension for both front and rear was controlled by long semi-elliptic springs aided by Armstrong hydraulic dampers.

A Special coupé body, they were features of almost all the Morris range for more than a decade, was no longer available but a "rolling" chassis remained in the catalogue for those who wished to have their car fitted with special coachwork. These very complete chassis kits included wings, running-boards, headlamps, instruments, spare wheel and complete tool kit.

=== Road test ===
The Times motoring correspondent declared the car had good room for four occupants and their head clearance, he said, was not unduly low. It was also noted the 4-wheel brakes were hydraulic and used the Lockheed patents. The new engine greatly reduced the need for gear changing. The car was described as commendably stable and the front seat passengers travelled comfortably. However at the back with orthodox front suspension there was more movement but the springing, so far as it went, was good. Steering was a star feature, firm yet light and without wandering or hesitation. About 70 miles an hour could be reached on top gear.

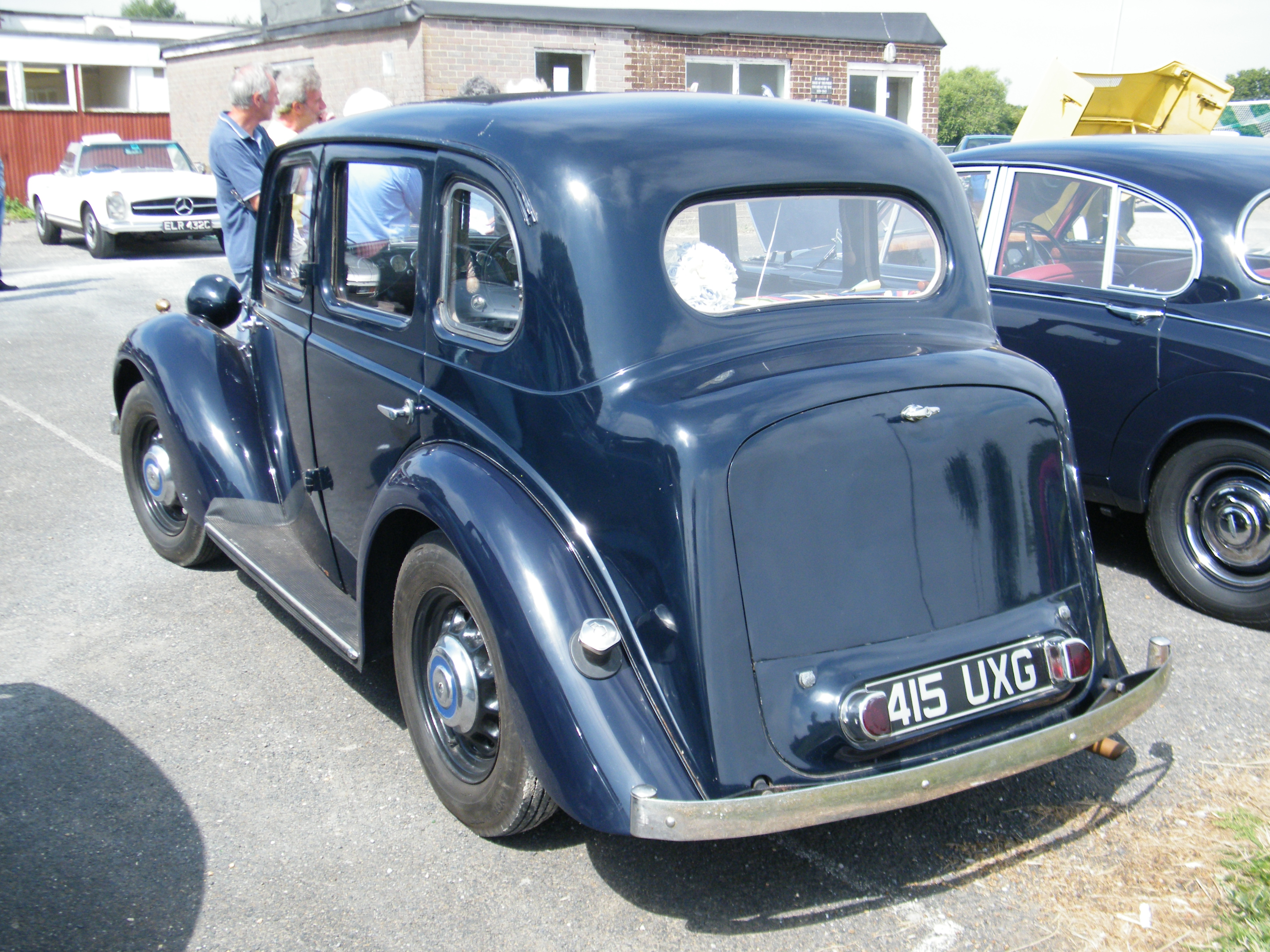

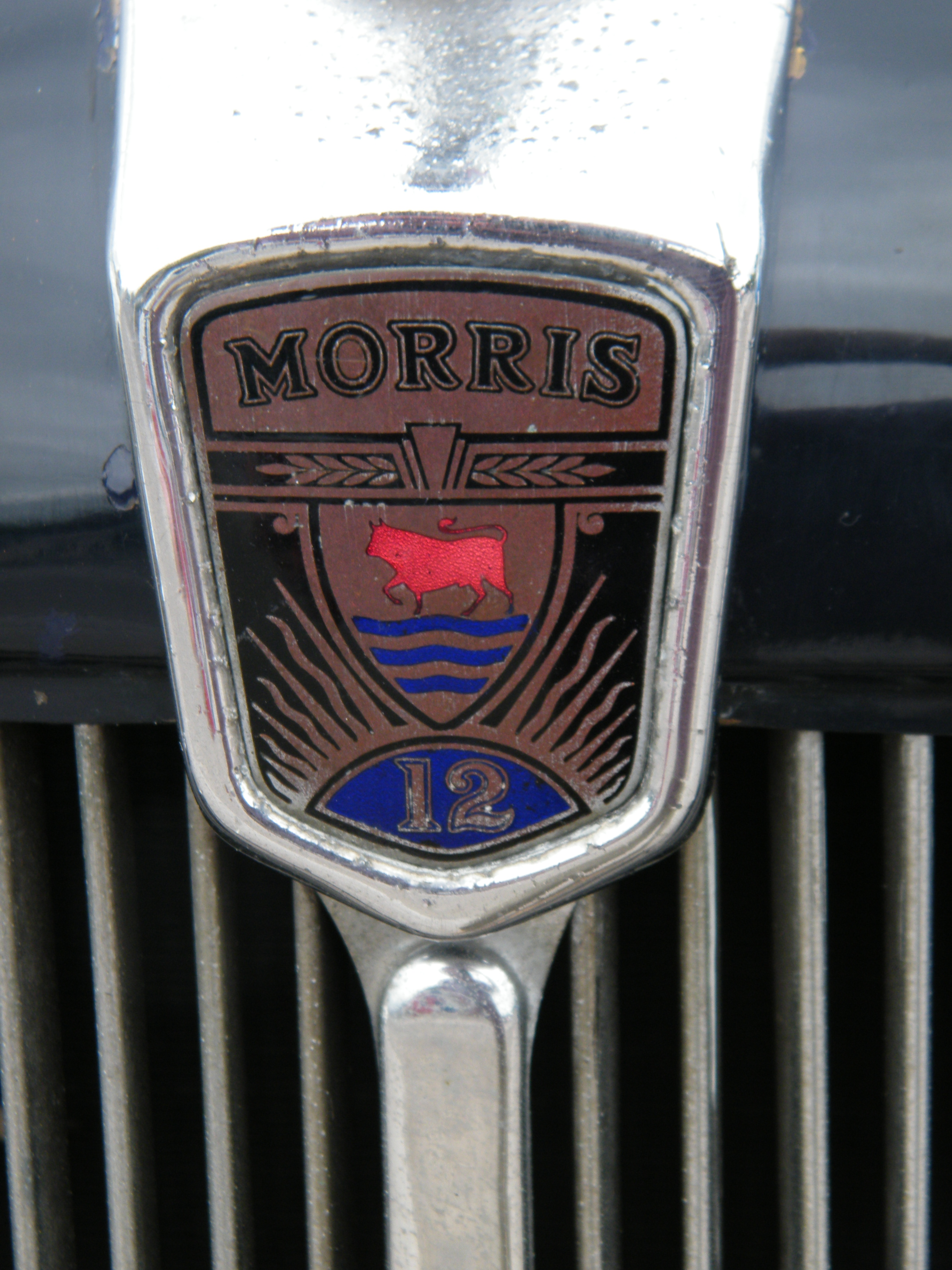

Morris 12 O H V TPBM Wolseley 12/48 TPBW MG VA TPBG

Overview
- Manufacturer: Morris Engines Limited

Layout
- Configuration: in-line four
- Displacement: 1548cc, 94.59 ci
- Cylinder bore: 69.5 mm, 2.73 in
- Piston stroke: 102 mm, 4.01 in
- Cylinder block material: cast in one with the skirt of the crankcase; three-bearing crankshaft; low-expansion aluminium alloy pistons, connecting rods steel
- Cylinder head material: detachable with valve gear intact
- Valvetrain: Overhead valves are operated by pushrods from the camshaft by the block's crankcase skirt. drive to the camshaft is by silent duplex roller chain

Combustion
- Fuel system: single SU carburettor and automatic electric fuel pump
- Fuel type: petrol
- Oil system: a spur gear pump driven from the camshaft pushes oil to main and big-end bearings, camshaft bearings and valve gear from a reservoir in the sump
- Cooling system: water circulated by centrifugal impeller and with thermostatic control

Output
- Power output: 41 bhp at 3900 rpm Treasury rating 11.98hp

Chronology
- Predecessor: Morris 12 sidevalve

As The Times puts it, "the orthodox front suspension", Morris's obsolescent rigid front axle, forced the passengers well back in the car into the six-light saloon shape despite the new-found preference for carrying all passengers "within the wheelbase". Once independent suspension was introduced, which was not in this case until 1948 and the Twelve's Oxford MO replacement, the engine could be right at the front of the car without leaving clearance below it for a rigid front axle.
