= Cunard (coachbuilder) =

British coachbuilder

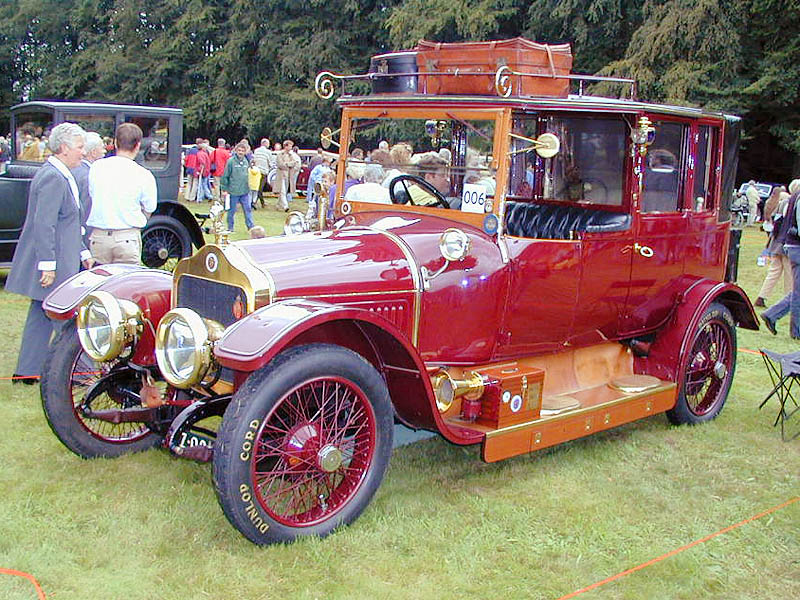
Landaulette 1913 Minerva chassis

The Cunard Motor & Carriage company was a British vehicle coachbuilder. It was founded in London in 1911 and continued in various forms up to the 1960s.

== Napier ==
The main customer for the bodies was Napier & Son and from its works in Lower Richmond Road, London, SW15 Cunard provided a range of coachwork to fit on Napier chassis. Shortly after its formation, Cunard became a subsidiary of Napier and acted as their in-house coachbuilder but continued to supply bodies to other companies.

== Weymann ==
In 1924 Napier stopped making cars and the Cunard business was sold to Weymann Motor Bodies Ltd who were looking for premises in which to build their range of car bodies. The Cunard name was dropped.

== Stewart and Ardern ==
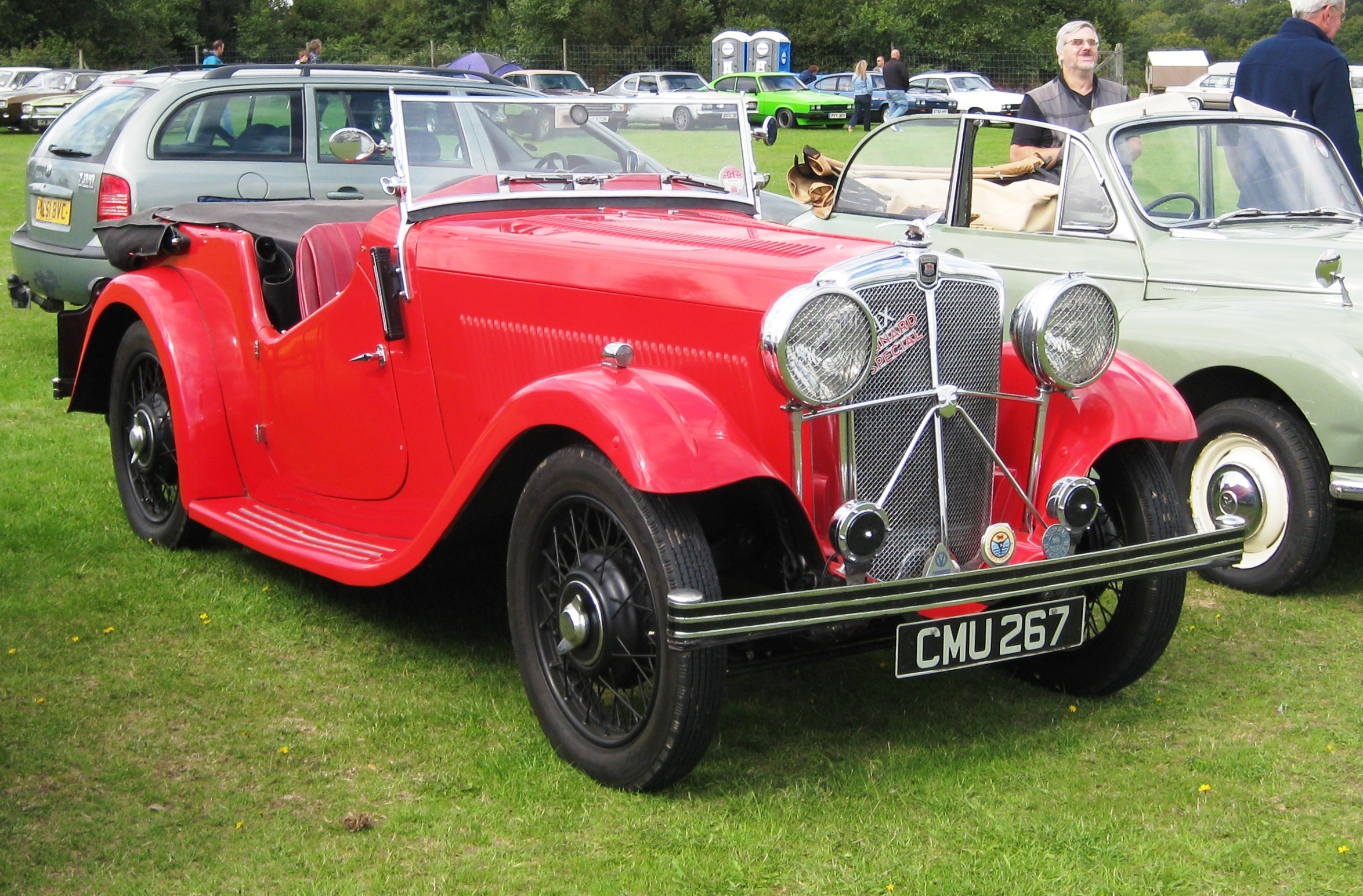
Cabriolet August 1935 Morris Ten Six chassis

The name was revived in 1930 by an ex Cunard managing director, R. I. Musselwhite and V. E. Freestone from another well known coachbuilder, Thrupp & Maberly. New premises were opened in Acton in West London. In 1931, after only a few bodies had been made, the company was bought by the London agent for Morris cars Stewart and Ardern and both Musselwhite and Freestone left. Production was now concentrated on a range of standard bodies for Morris, Rover and Wolseley (especially the Hornet model).

=== Commercial vehicle bodies ===
With the decline in the specialist coachwork business as car makers increasingly turned to mass-produced, pressed steel bodies, Cunard moved into commercial vehicle bodies. The name was changed to Cunard Commercial Carriage Company and a move made to Water Road Alperton Wembley in North London where it Was run by Mr Freeman As Works Manager and Mr Fred Winyard in overall. control General Foreman was Mr Ron Greensheilds. During the early 60s a number of Morris Minis were modified by lowering the suspension, the roof height and replacing All the glass with Perspex. The company continued into the late 1960s
