= Morris Ten =

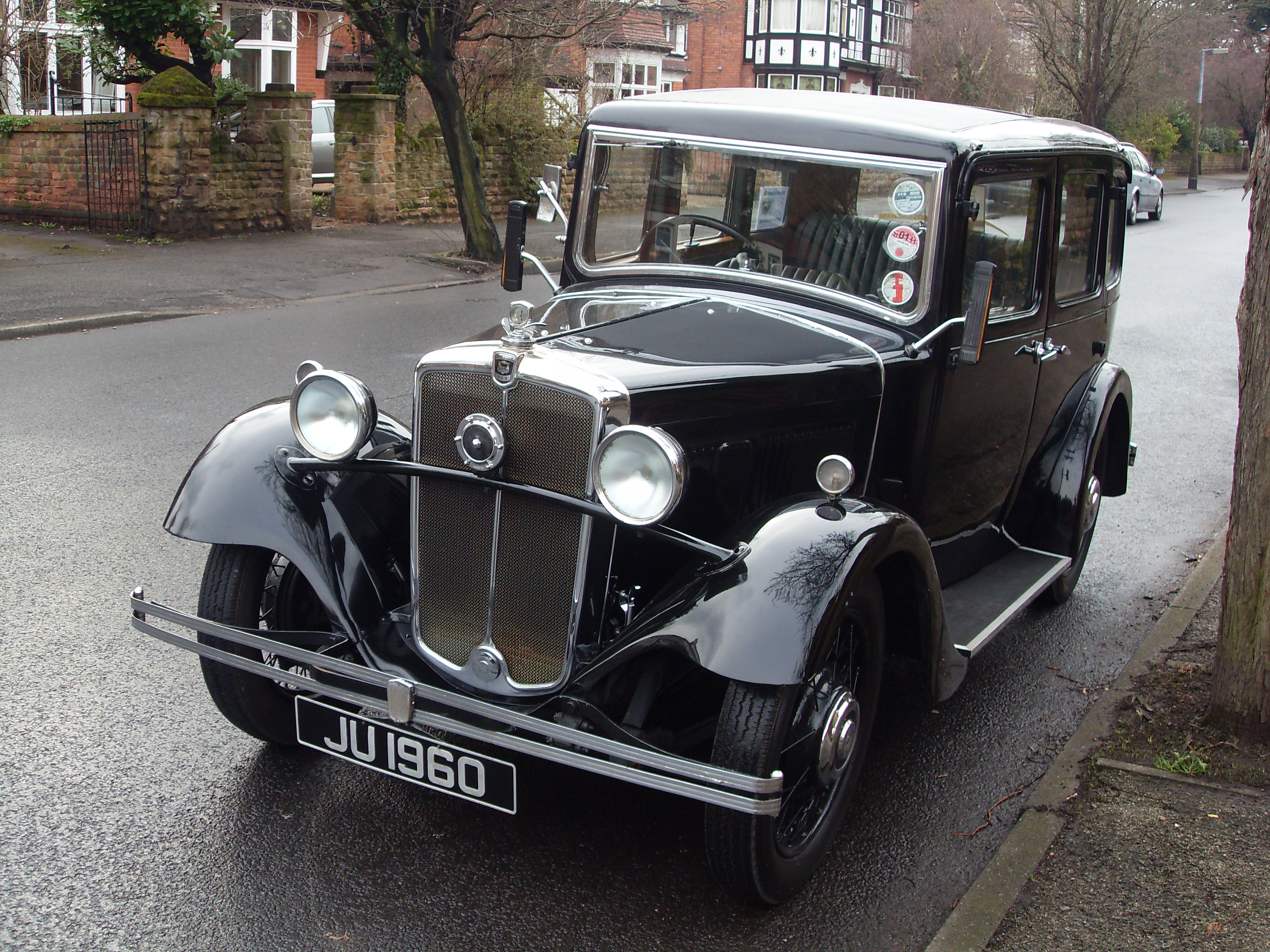
- Ten 1292cc 6-light 4-door fixed head saloon first registered March 1933

Overview
- Manufacturer: Morris
- Production: 1932–1948
- Assembly: Cowley, Oxford, Oxfordshire, United Kingdom

Body and chassis
- Class: Mid-size car
- Layout: FR layout

Chronology
- Successor: Morris Oxford MO

The Morris Ten is a medium-sized car introduced for 1933 as the company's offering in the important 10 hp sector of the British market. It continued through a series of variants until October 1948 when along with Morris's Twelve and Fourteen it was replaced by the 13.5 hp Morris Oxford MO.

== Morris Ten and Ten Four ==
Morris Ten Morris Ten Four
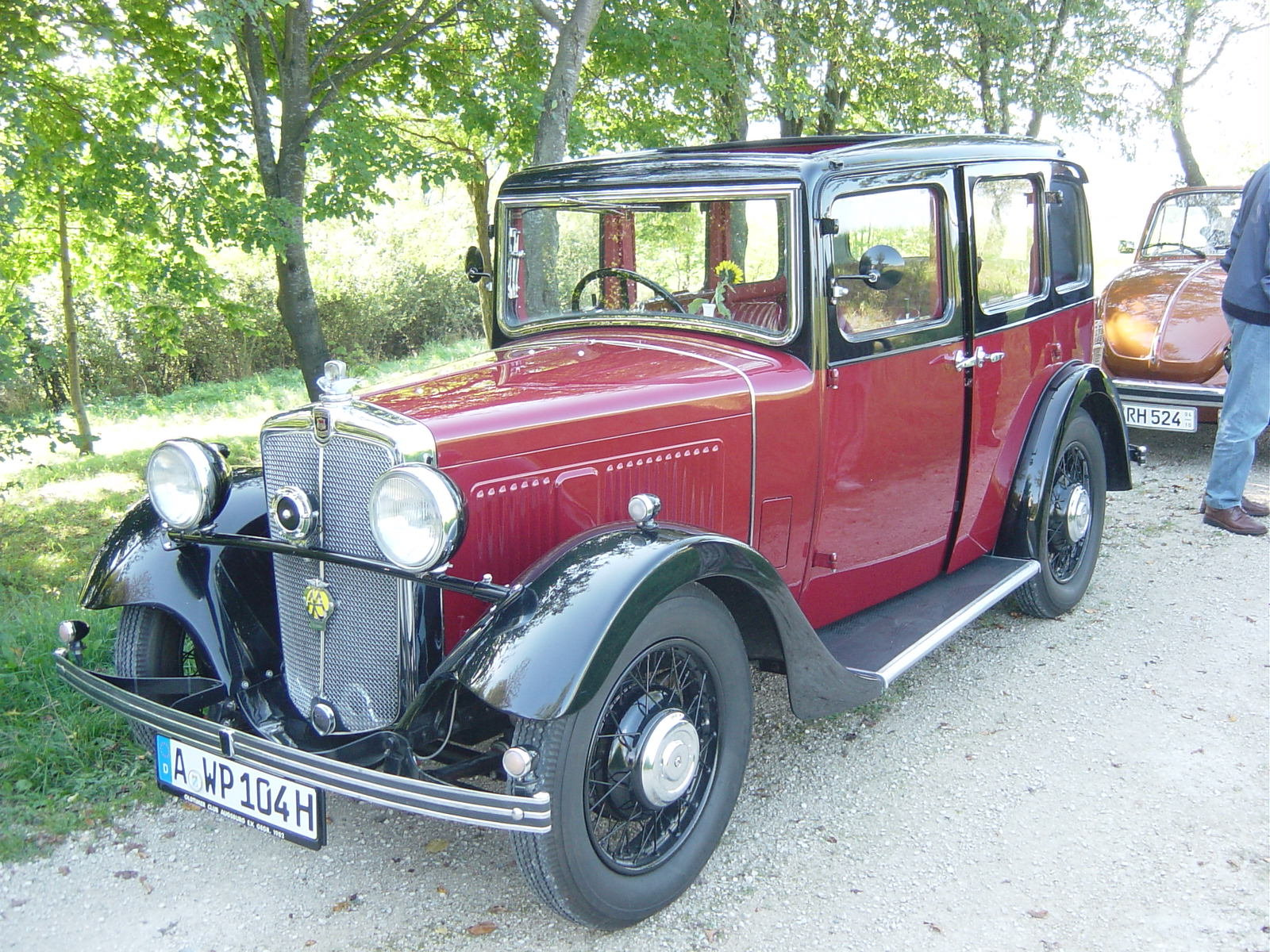
- Ten Four 4-door 6-light saloon

Overview
- Production: 1932–1935; 49,238 produced (including Ten Six models)

Body and chassis
- Body style: 4-door 6-light saloon 4-door tourer 2-door Special fixed head coupé Open two seater

Powertrain
- Engine: 1,292 cc (1.3 L) Morris Sidevalve I4
- Transmission: 4-speed manual

Dimensions
- Wheelbase: 96 in (2,438 mm)
- Length: 147 in (3,734 mm)

Announced 1 September 1932, the Morris Ten was a new class of car for Morris. It was equipped with wire wheels and a new type of mud guarding—domed wings with wing side shields. Power was from a Morris 1292 cc four-cylinder side-valve engine employing a single SU carburettor, which produced 24 bhp at 3,200 rpm. it had a four-speed manual transmission behind a wet cork clutch, and Lockheed hydraulic brakes on 19 inch wheels. Early models had a centre accelerator pedal and large sidelamps on the wings, the propeller shaft had Cardan (Rag joint) disc couplings made from leather. After 1933 wheels became 18 inch and the accelerator pedal was moved to the right of the cluster in line with the modern convention.

The October 1932 Olympia Motor Show introductory prices:

- chassis £127.10.0
- coach-built saloon with sliding head £169.10.0
- special coupé with sliding head £195.0.0

Body styles at launch in August 1932 were restricted to a saloon and two-door coupé, but a four-door tourer joined the range in December, followed in 1934 by a two-seater with dickey seat and a Traveller's Saloon.

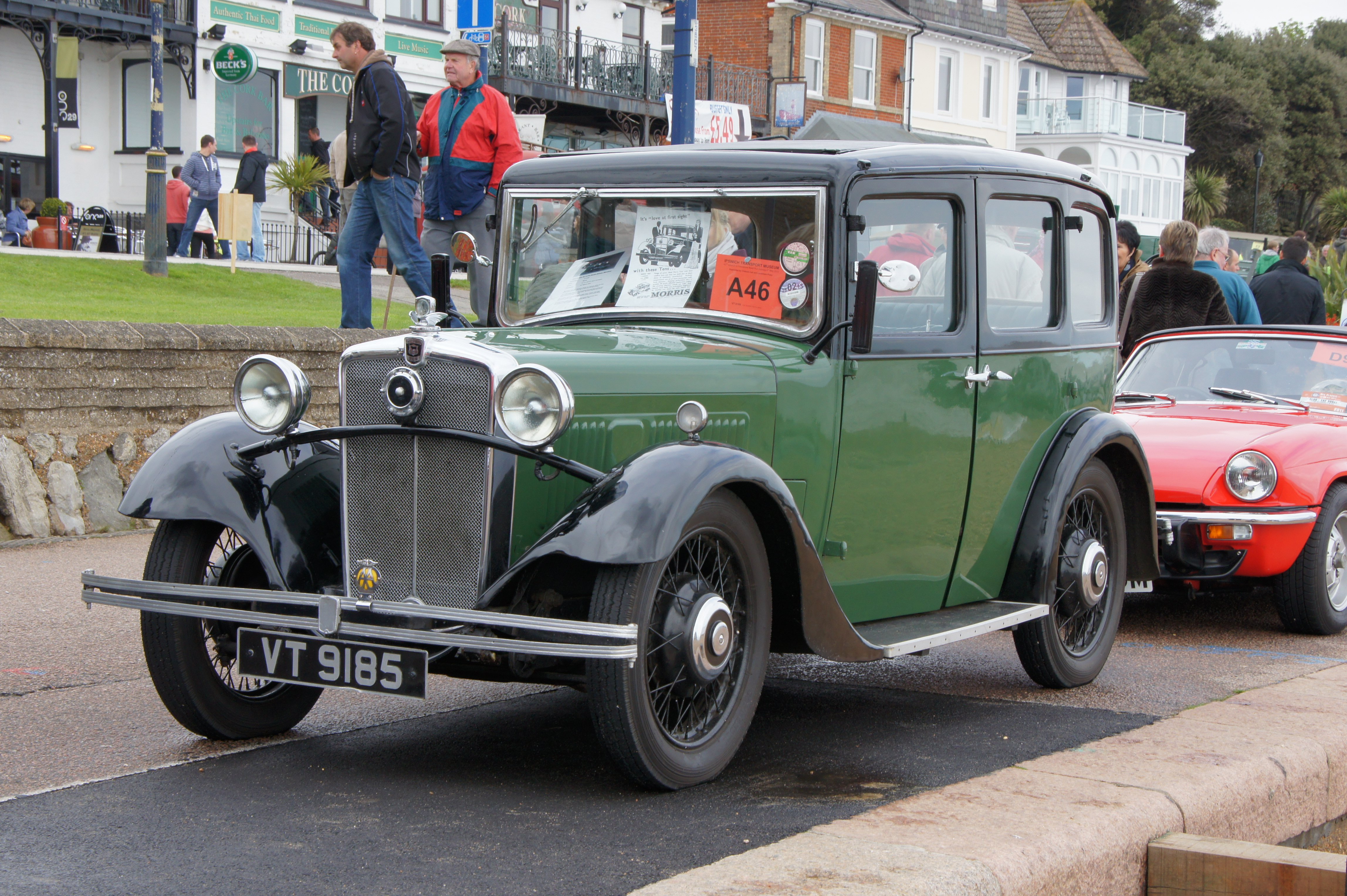
Morris Ten 4-door 6-light saloon 1933

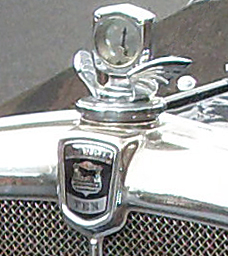
Ten badge

=== Ten Four ===
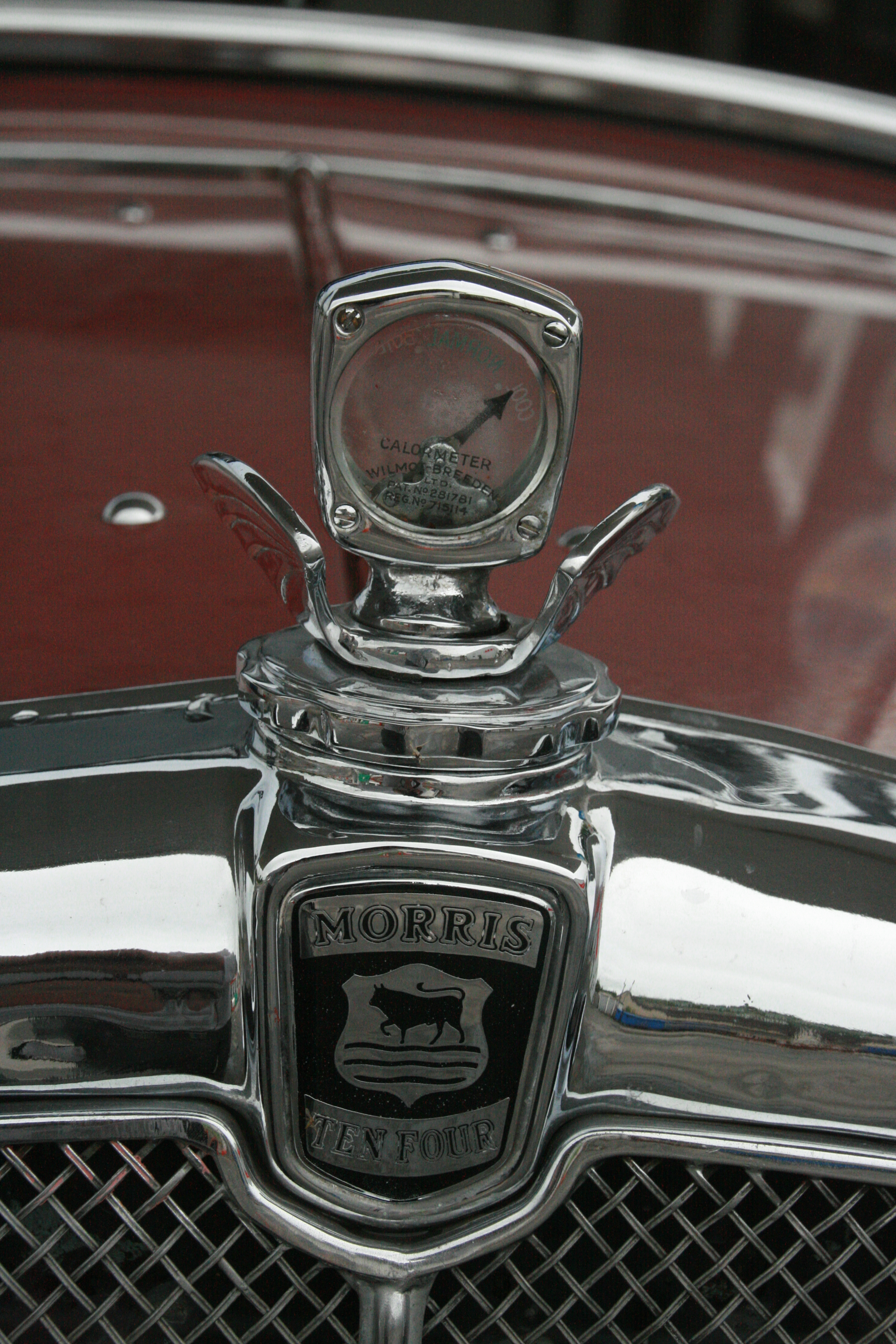
Ten Four badge

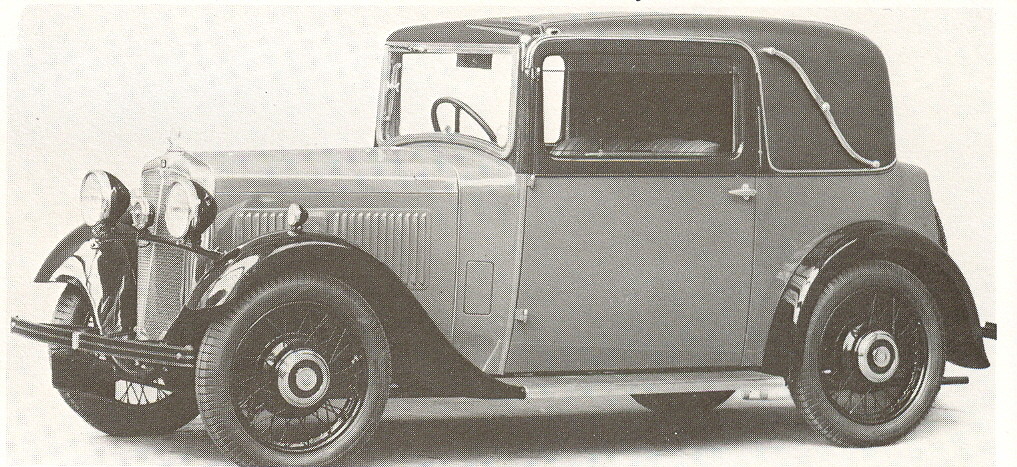
Ten Four Special coupé
with sliding head

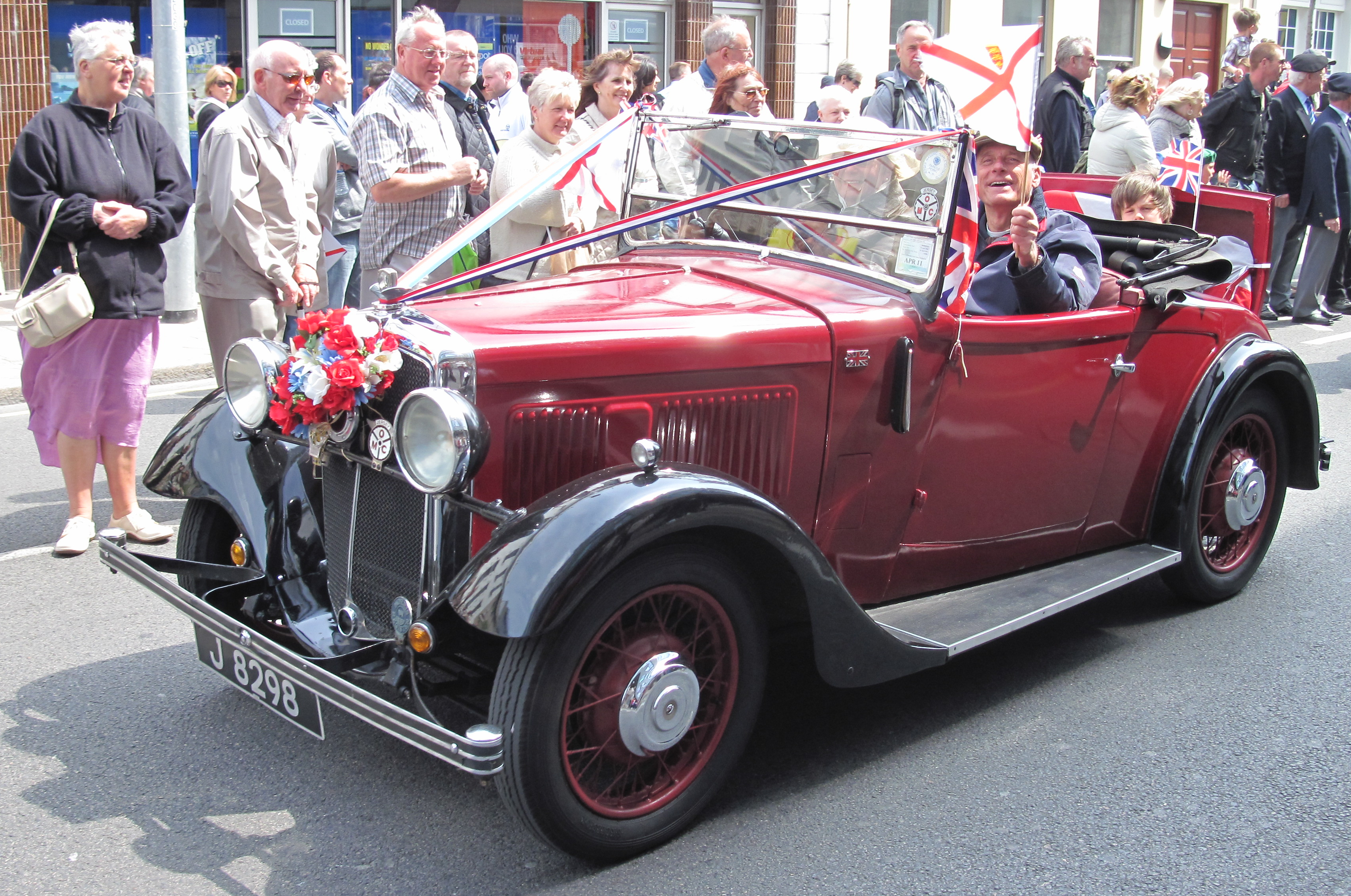
Open two-seater
with dickey

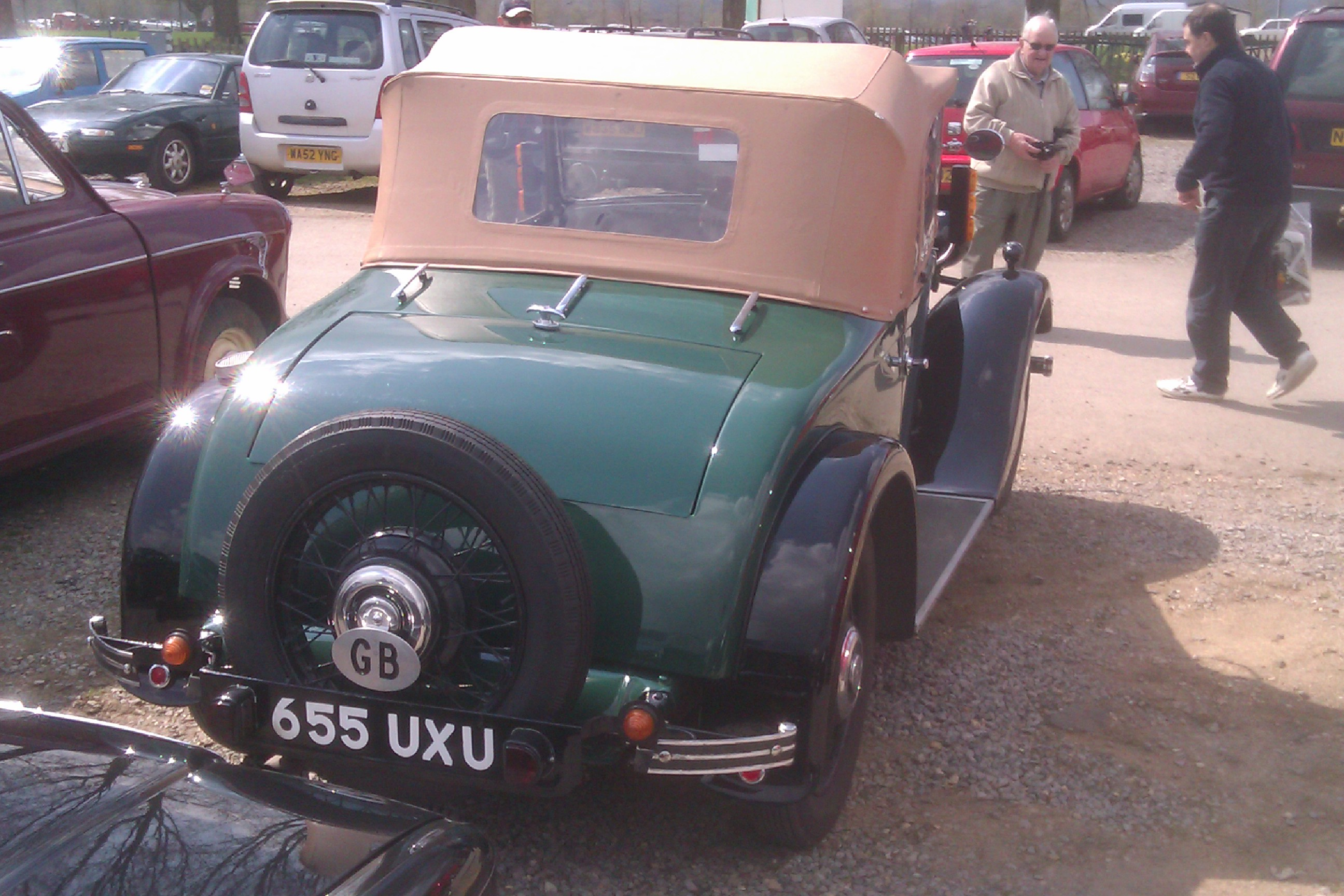
Closed dickey seat

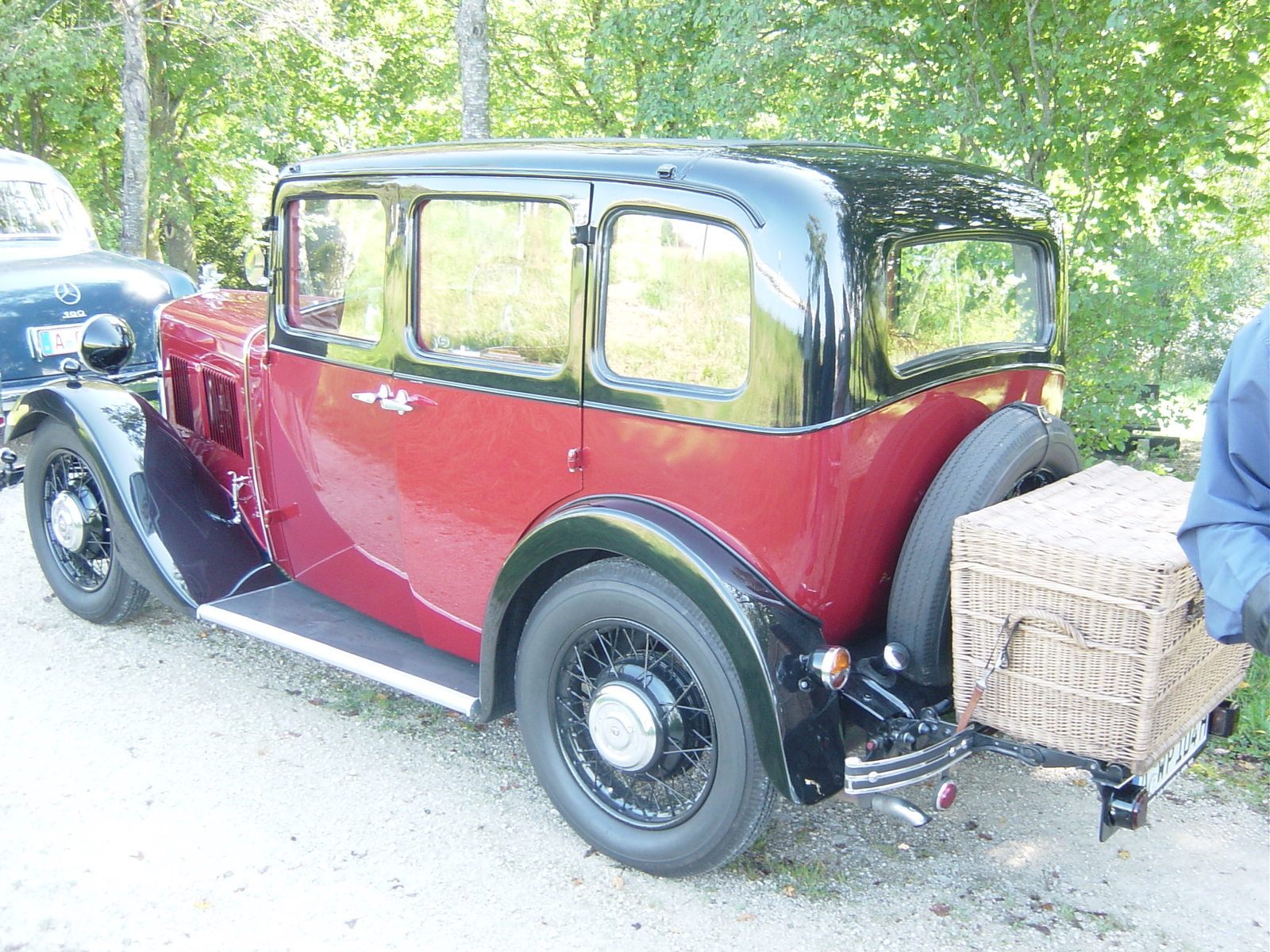
Ten Four with luggage
on the fold-down rack

Twelve months later, with the introduction of the Ten Six, Four was added to the Ten's name. The chassis was strengthened, engine mountings were revised and synchromesh appeared on the gearbox. Engine output was increased to 27½ bhp by April 1934. Two tone paint schemes were optional from 1935.

== Morris Ten Six ==
Morris Ten Six
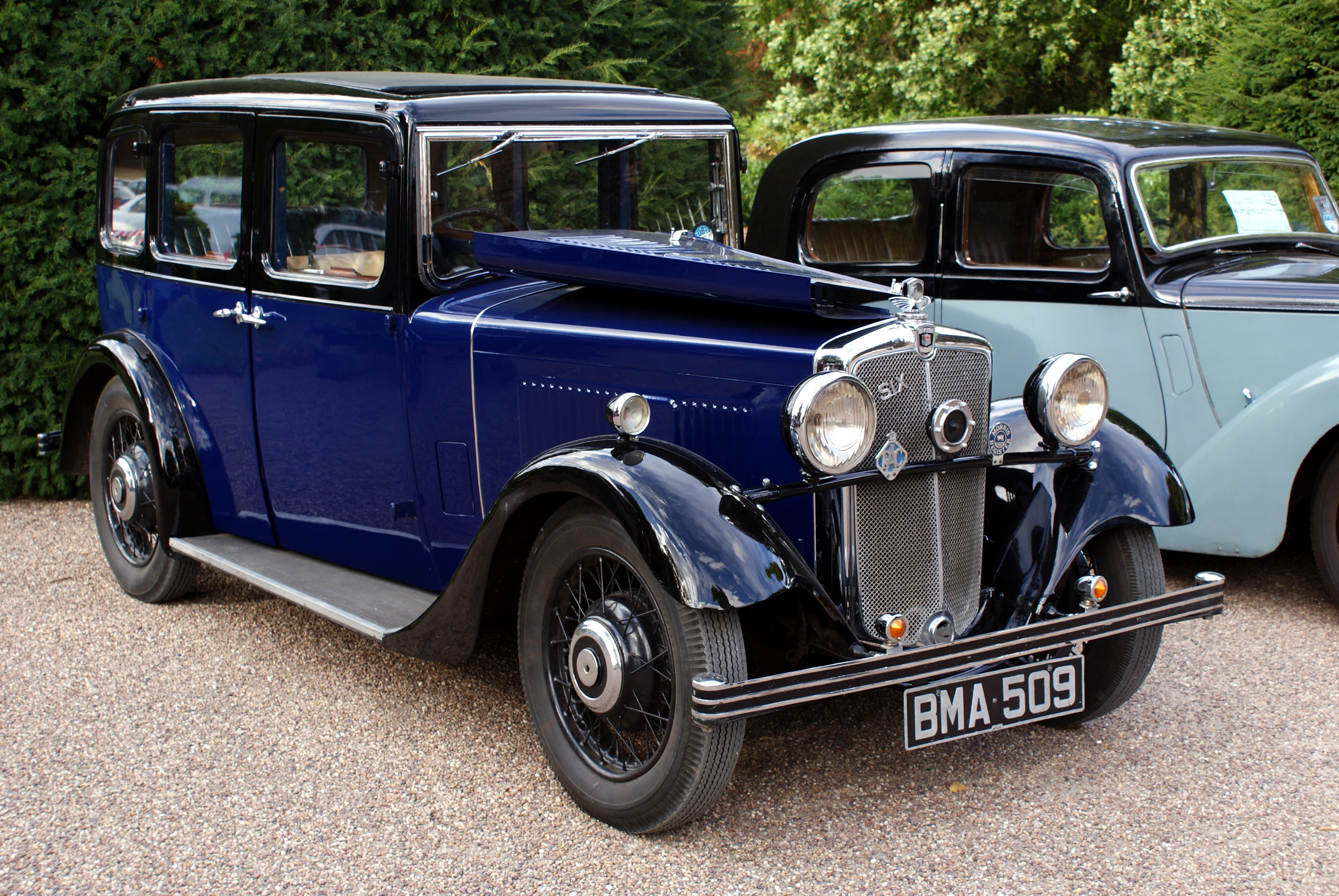
- Ten Six 4-door six-light saloon 1934

Overview
- Production: 1934-1935 production – see Ten-Four

Body and chassis
- Body style: 4-door saloon 5-door Traveller's saloon Open two-seater 4-door tourer 2-door Special coupé Special sports

Powertrain
- Engine: 1,378 cc (1.4 L) Morris Sidevalve I6
- Transmission: 3-speed manual

Dimensions
- Wheelbase: 102 in (2,591 mm)

On 28 August 1933 a 12 hp six-cylinder version of the Ten was announced on the longer-wheelbase chassis of the Cowley Four.

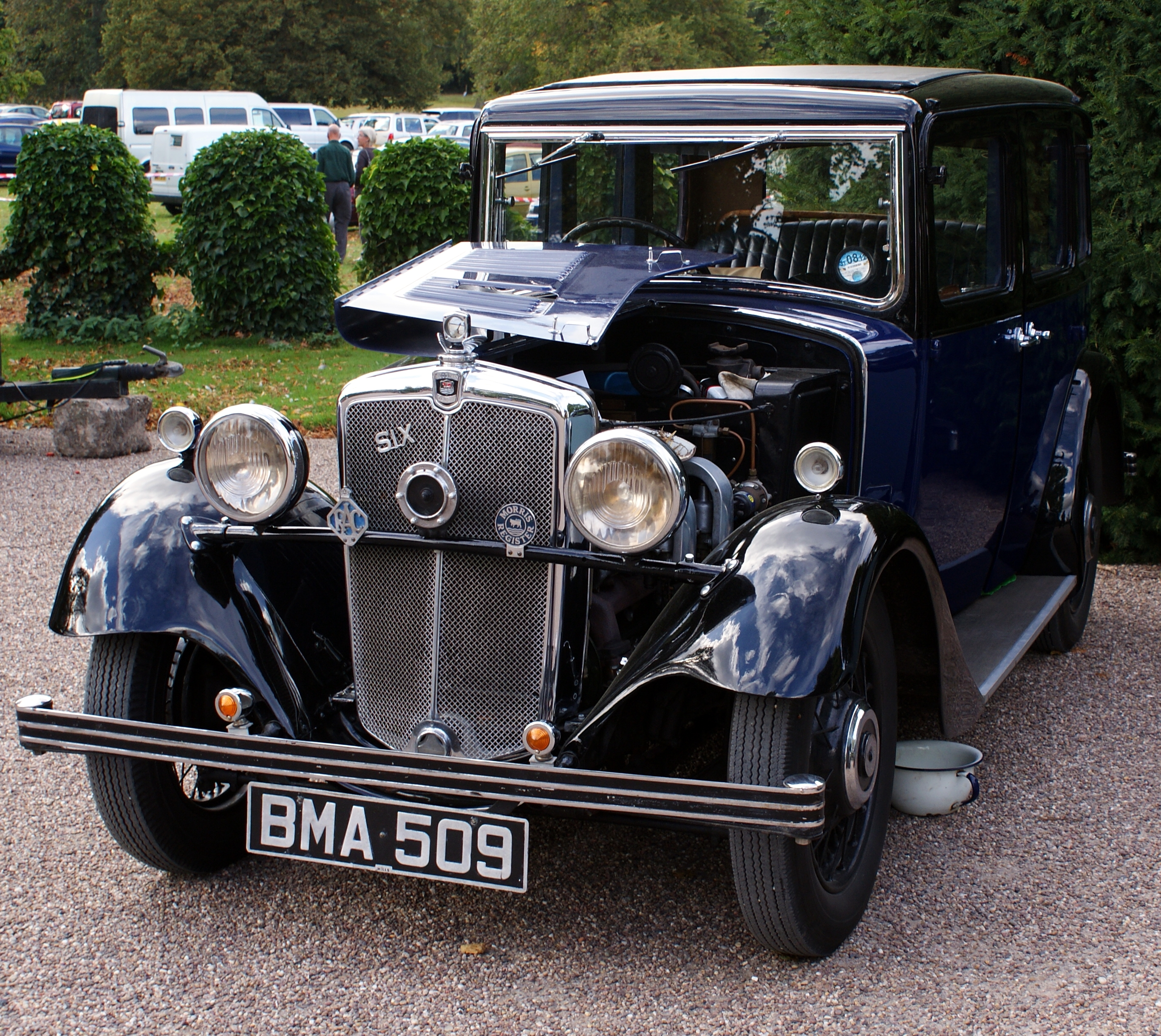
Ten Six showing air silencer and fume control

Prices

- Special coupé £215
- Traveller's saloon £200
- Sliding head saloon £189.10.0
- Fixed head saloon £184
- Tourer £184
- Two-seater £180

A sporting version, the Ten-Six Special was also made in small numbers with tuned engine and twin SU carburettors. the standard body was an open four-seater, but some chassis were supplied to coachbuilders.

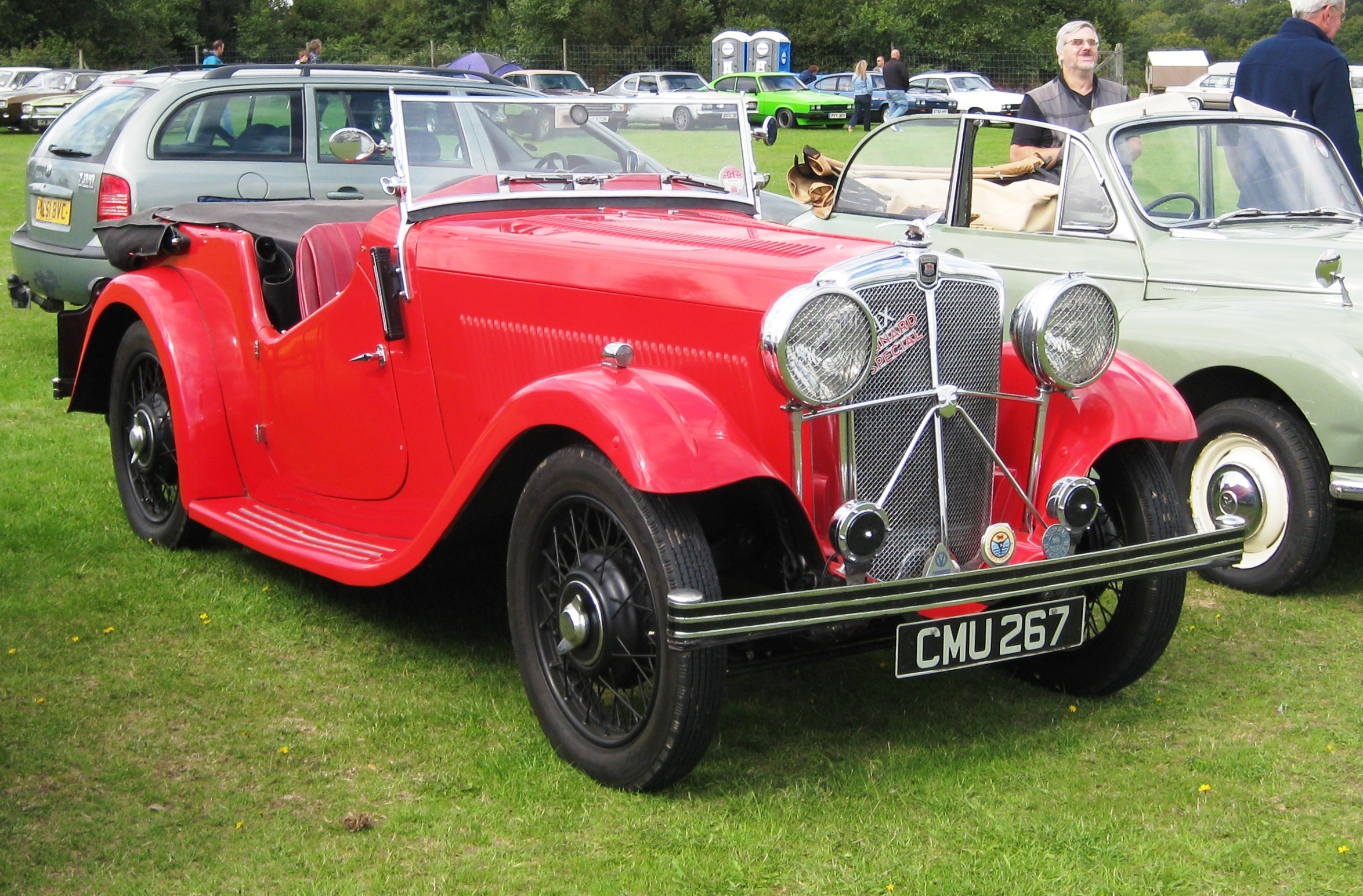
Cabriolet body by Cunard first registered August 1935

=== Ten Six Special sports ===
The Morris Ten Six Special sports displayed at Olympia in October 1933 had a long bonnet with a strap, louvred valances by the frame without running boards, low-sloping or cutaway doors, and a flared back with a low tail. Its chassis was as the Ten Six with twin carburettors, a special radiator with stone-guard, spring steering wheel, special speedometer and revolution indicator, remote gearbox control, two horns, an electric petrol pump and automatic ignition advance.

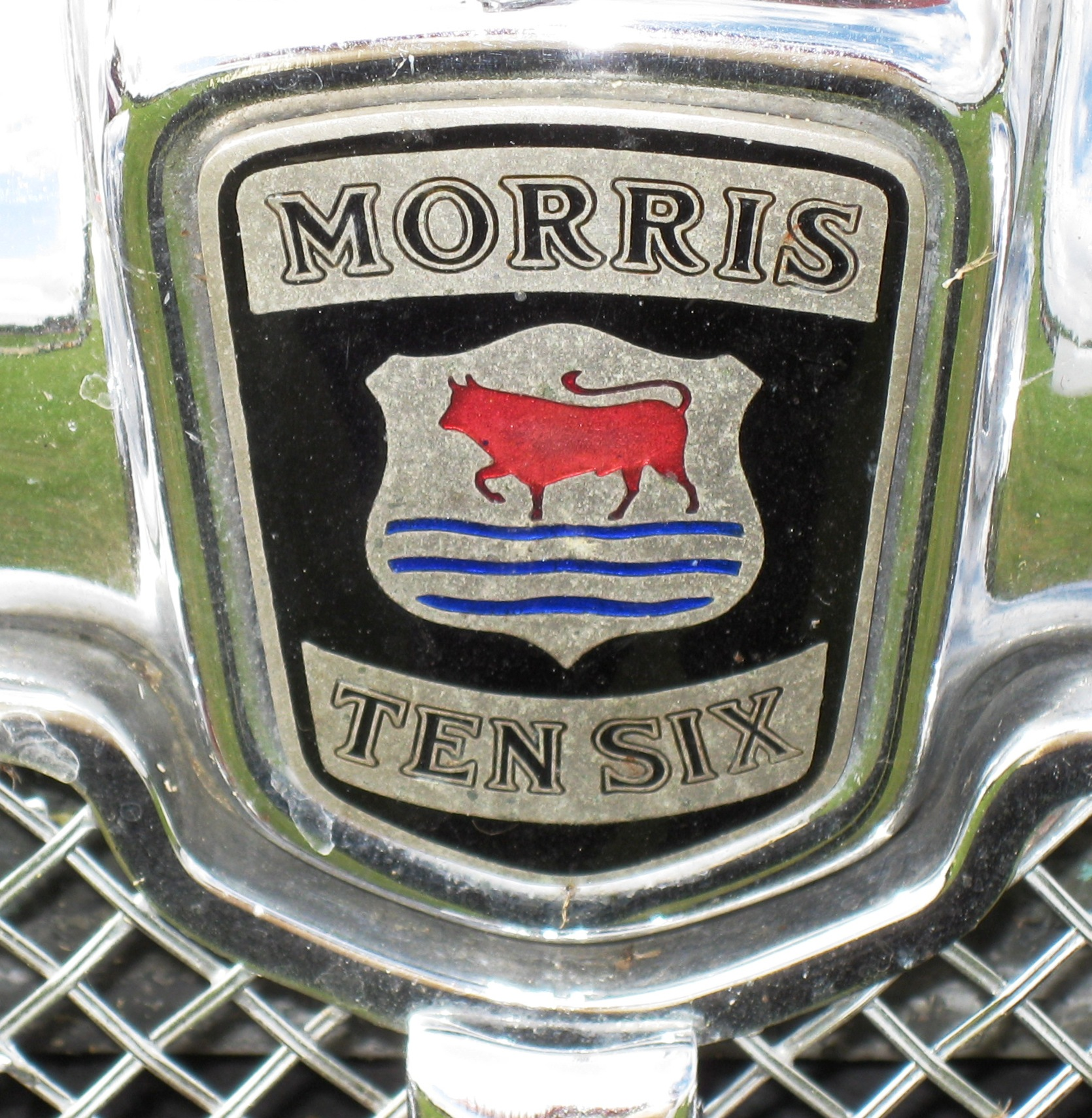

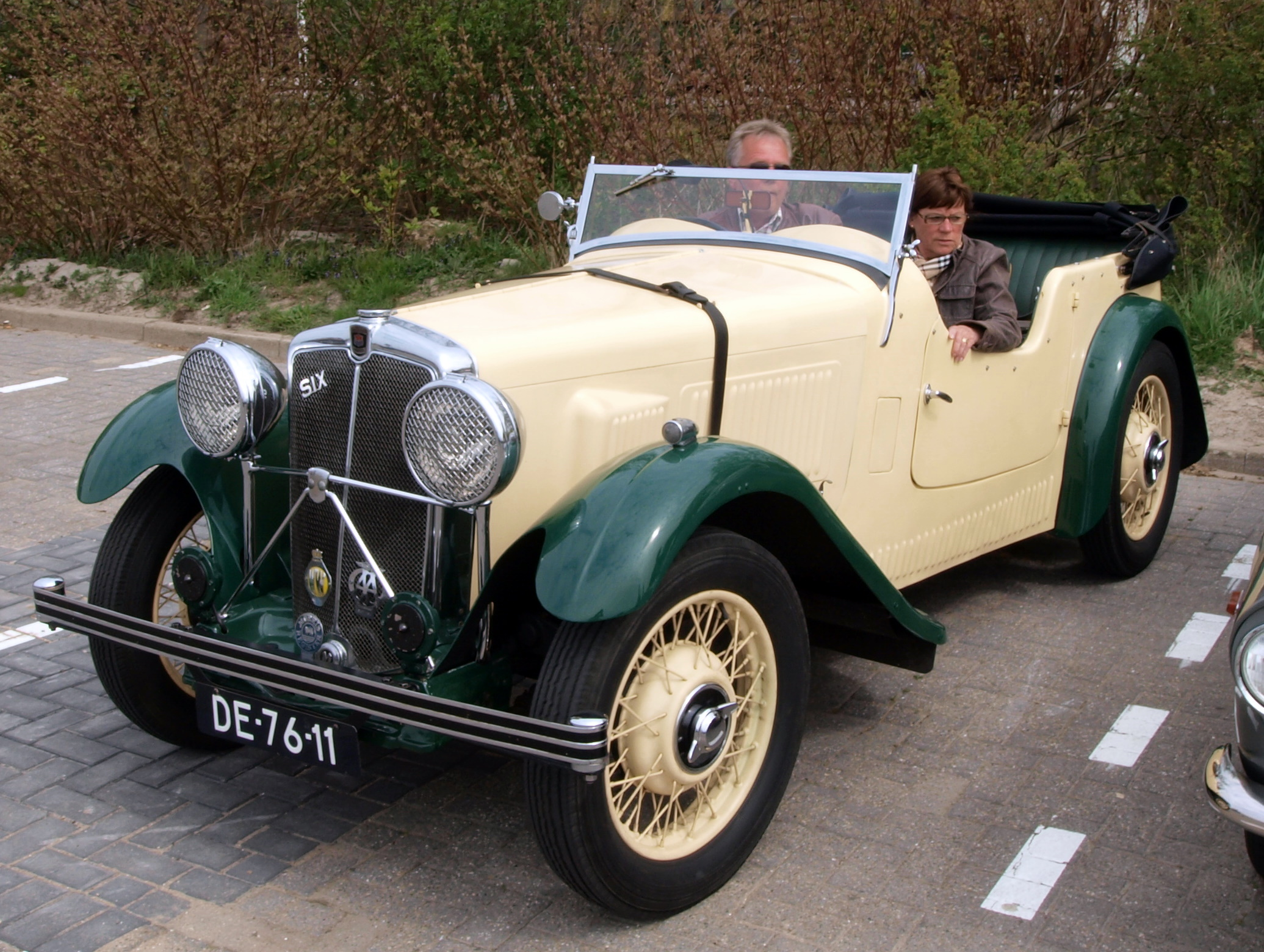
Special sports
as shown at Olympia

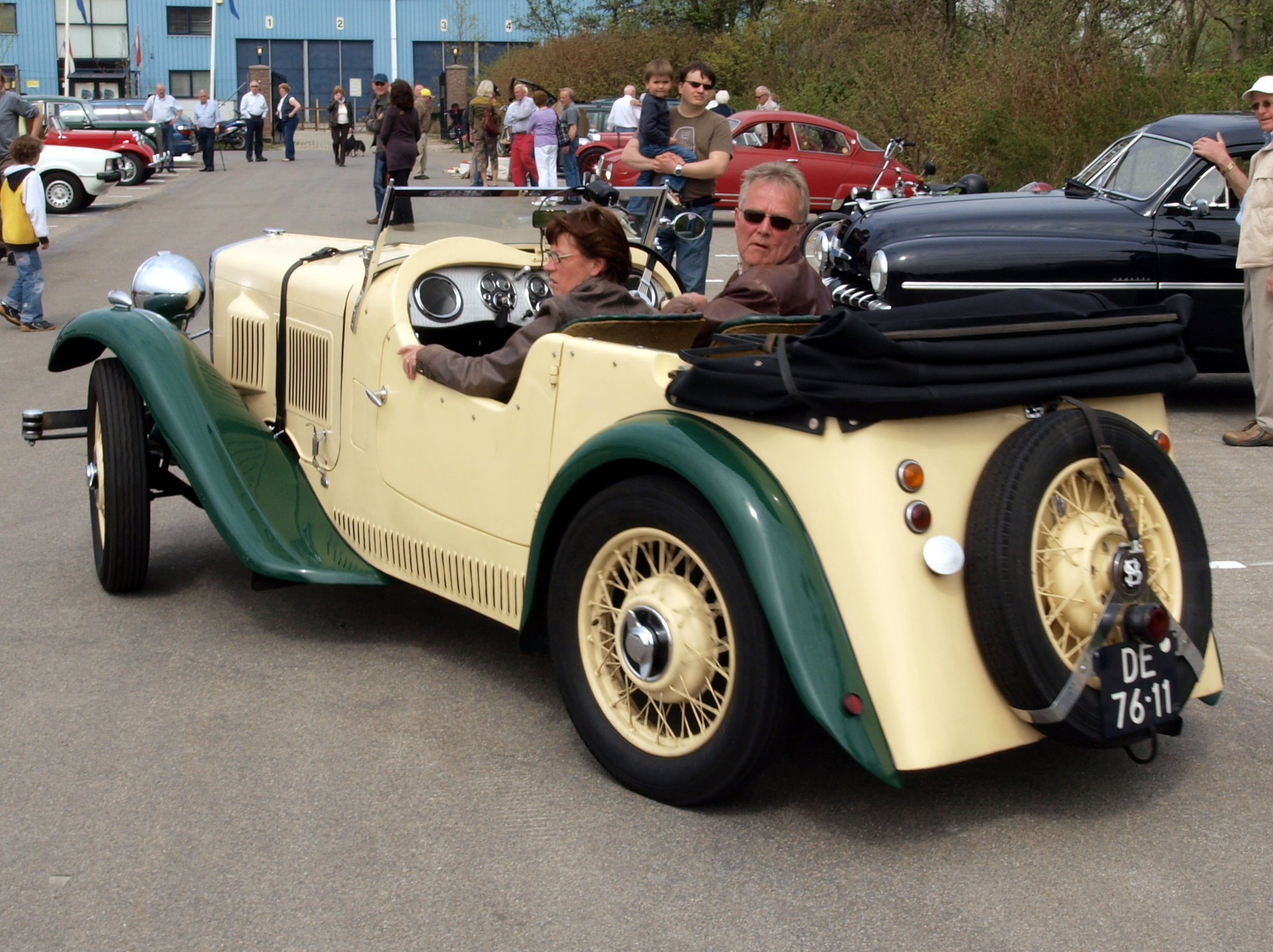

== Morris Ten series II ==
Morris Ten series II
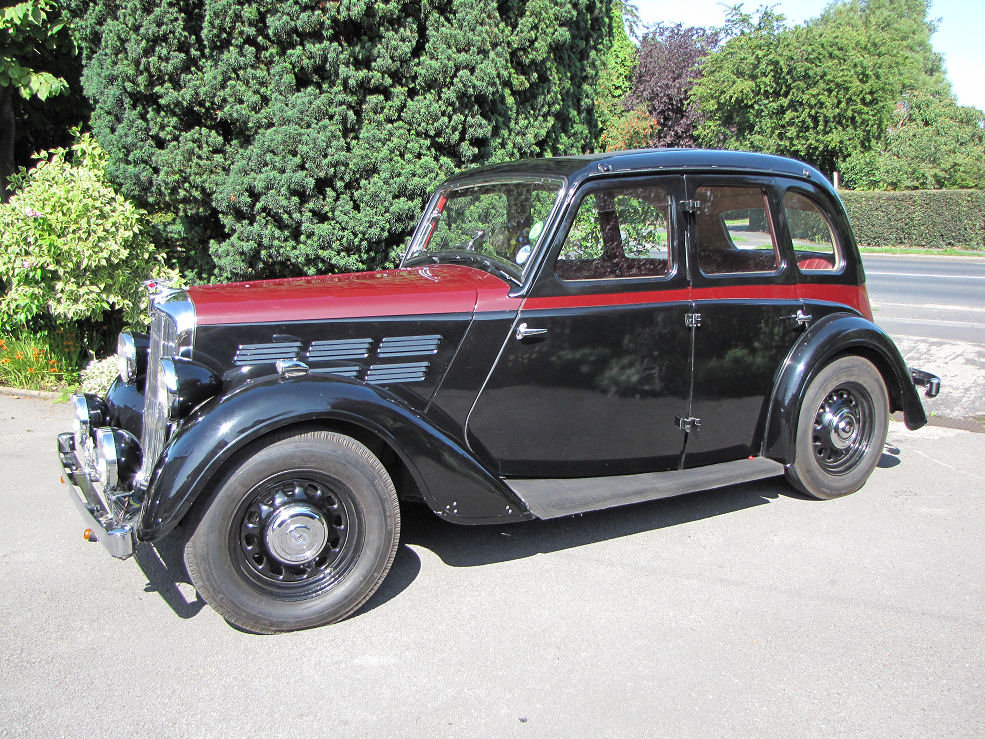
- series II 4-door six-light saloon Easiclene pressed steel wheels

Overview
- Production: 1935–1937; 59,364 (including Morris Twelve series II) produced

Body and chassis
- Body style: 4-door saloon 2-door coupé

Powertrain
- Engine: 1,292 cc (1.3 L)Morris Sidevalve engine I4
- Transmission: 3-speed manual 4-speed manual

Dimensions
- Wheelbase: 98 in (2,489 mm)

A rationalisation of the Morris range took place in 1935 and the new Ten series II shared its body and chassis with the Morris Twelve series II. A three-speed manual gearbox was fitted at first, but a four-speed reappeared as an option from 1936 and standard from 1937. Steel disc Easiclene wheels replaced the wire ones at the end of 1936. Two tone paintwork is common.

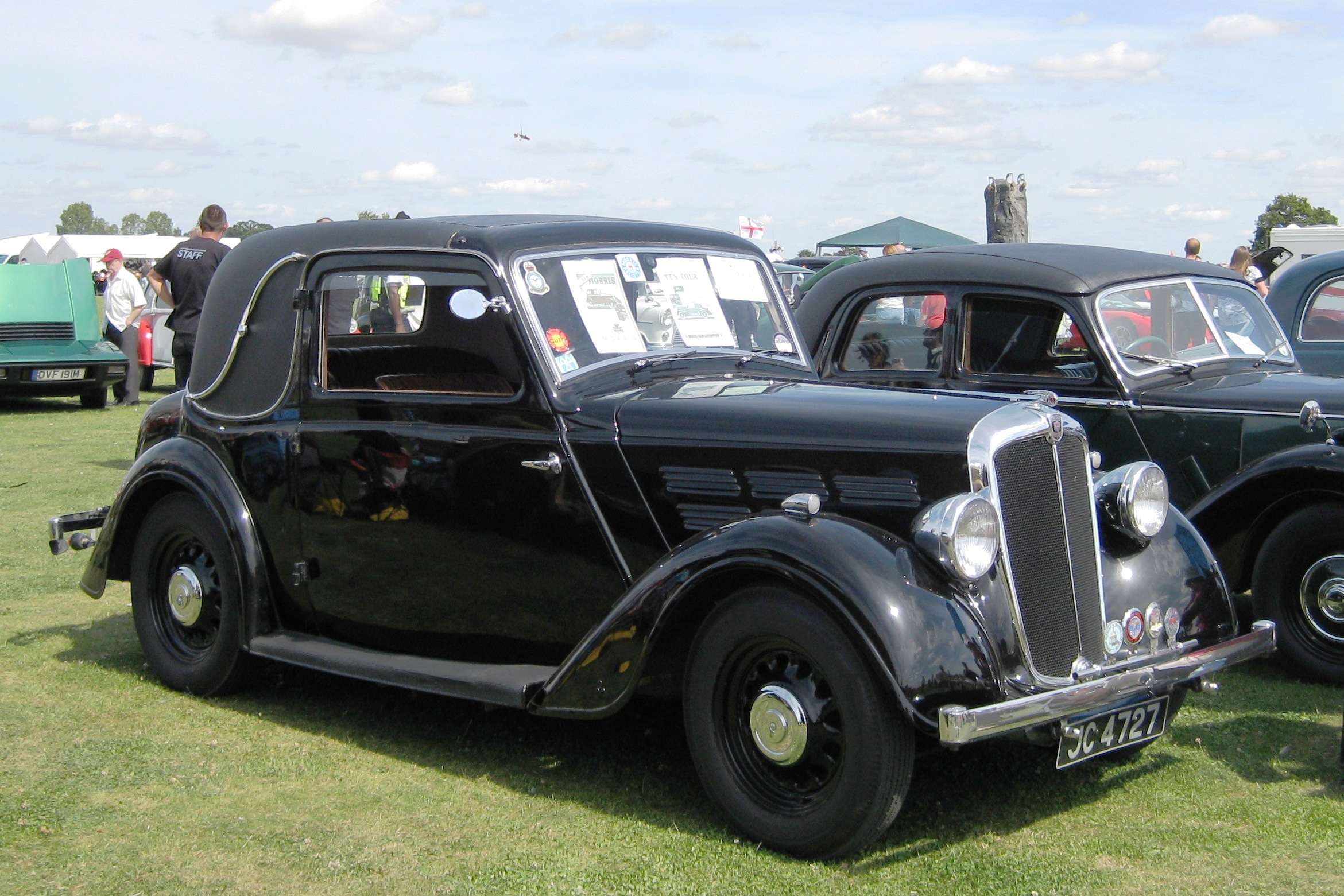
Special coupé series II

== Morris Ten series III ==
Morris Ten series III
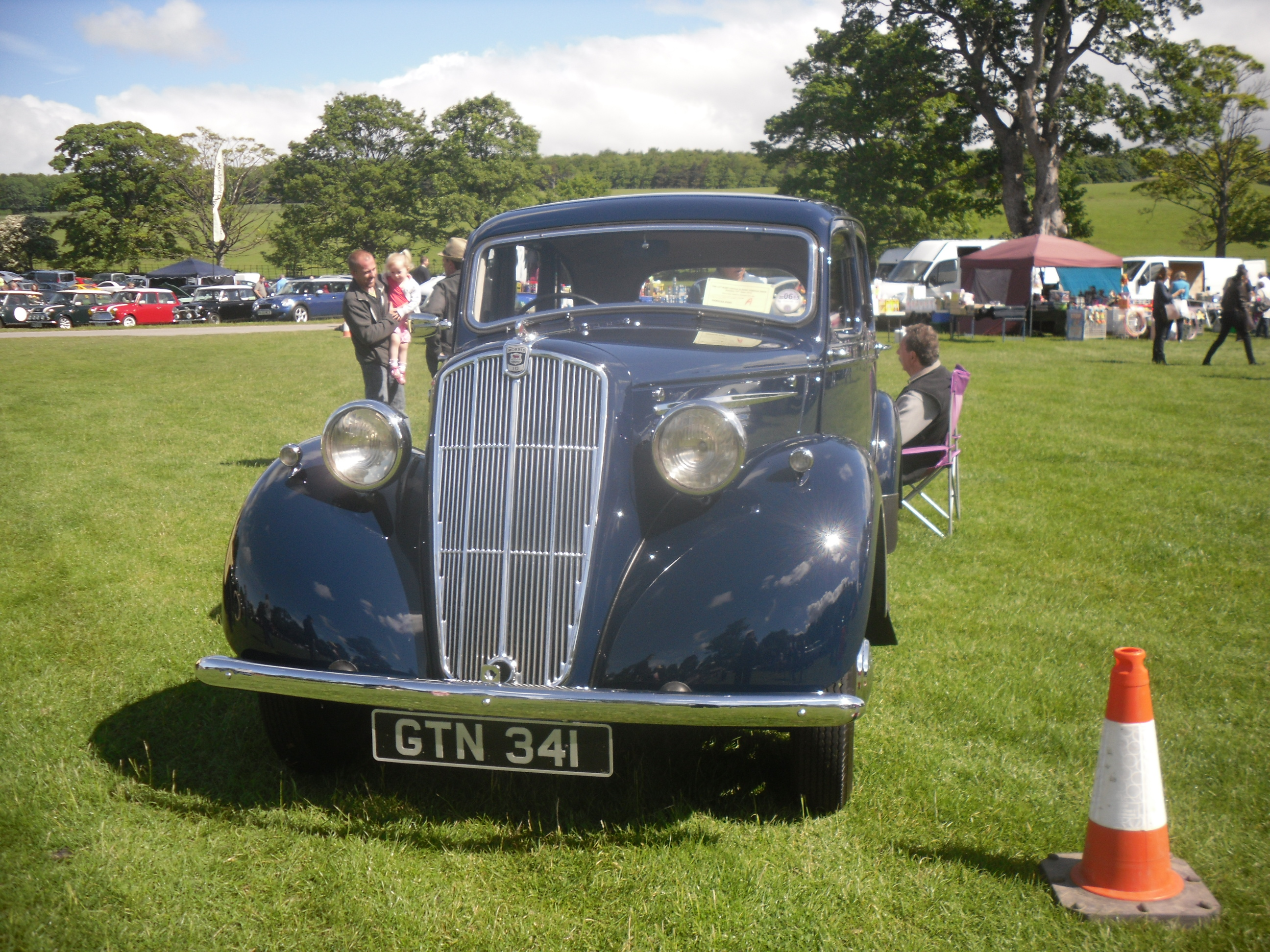
- Ten series M saloon 1938

Overview
- Production: 1938; 13,719 produced

Body and chassis
- Body style: 4-door saloon 3-foot coupé

Powertrain
- Engine: 1,292 cc (1.3 L) Morris overhead valve engine I4
- Transmission: 4-apeed manual

Dimensions
- Wheelbase: 98 in (2,489 mm)
- Length: 160 in (4,064 mm)
- Width: 61 in (1,549 mm)
- Height: 64 in (1,626 mm)

For 1938 the engine was updated to overhead valve as fitted to the Wolseley Ten increasing the power output from 27 to 37.5 bhp. The chromium-plated radiator surround was replaced by a painted one, and all paint schemes were single, rather than two-tone.

== Morris Ten Series M ==
Morris Ten Series M
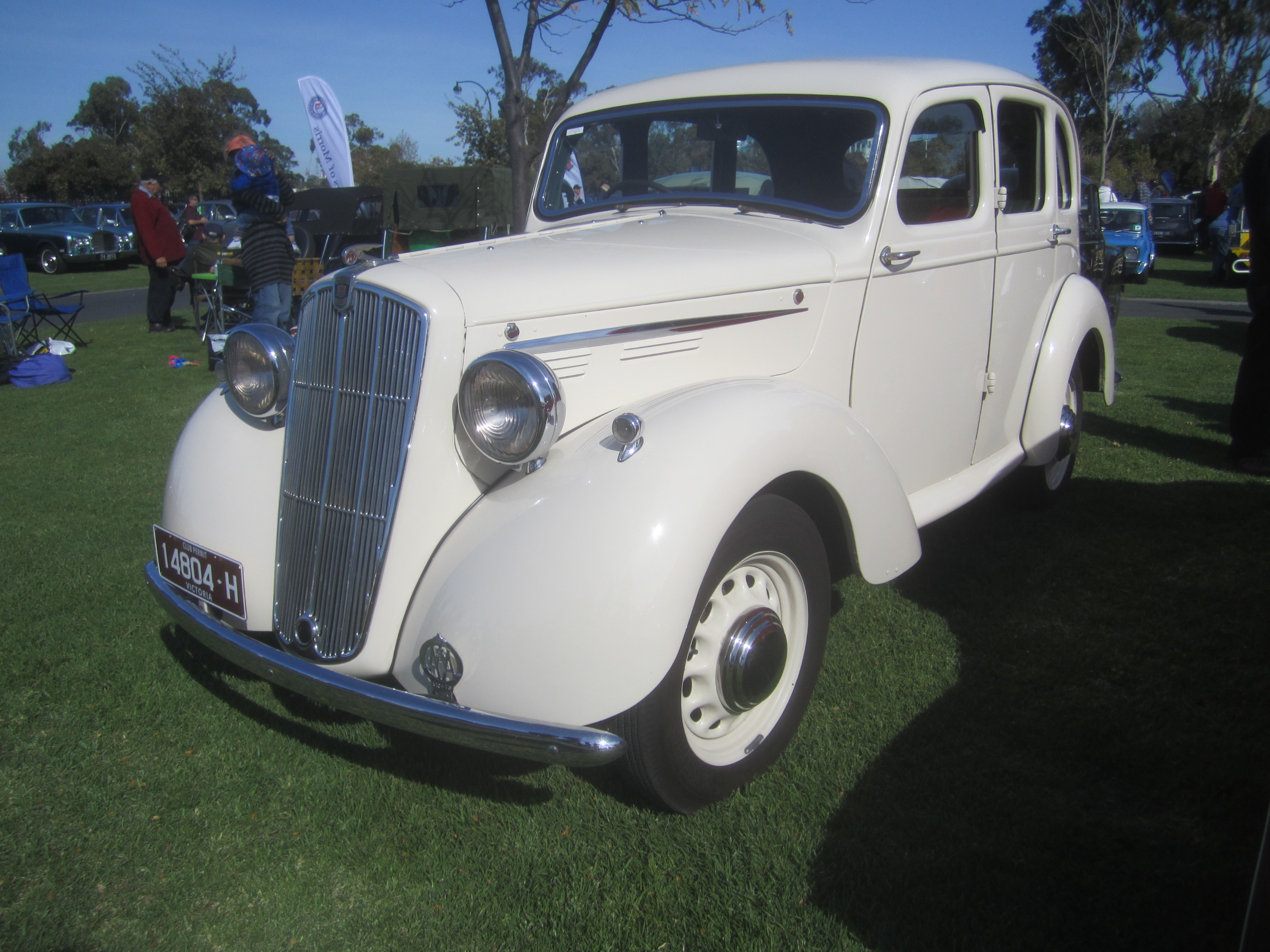
- 1940 Morris Ten Series M (Australia)

Overview
- Production: 1938–1948; 27,020 produced pre war 53,566 produced post war
- Assembly: United Kingdom; Australia

Body and chassis
- Body style: 4-door saloon 2-door pick up (wartime only)
- Related: Wolseley Ten

Powertrain
- Engine: 1,140 cc (1.1 L) Morris XPJM overhead valve engine I4
- Transmission: 4-speed manual

Dimensions
- Wheelbase: 94 in (2,388 mm)
- Length: 158 in (4,013 mm)
- Width: 61 in (1,549 mm)
- Height: 65 in (1,651 mm)

The Morris Ten Series M was introduced in 1938. It was a completely new car with unitary construction, although the styling was little-changed from the outgoing Series III. The engine was also new, being the 1140cc X-Series with an output of 37 bhp (28 kW) at 4600 rpm. Although an overhead valve engine like the M-Series engine fitted to the previous Ten Series III, the X-Series was a brand new design following the disappointing performance and reliability of M-Series, which was related to the older Morris sidevalve engines. The Series M's X-Series engine had a 'free-flow' eight-port cylinder head and adopted features from contemporary American engines including a pressurised pump-driven cooling system, a fully filtered lubrication system and an automatic tensioner for the camshaft chain. Along with the contemporary Vauxhall 10-4 the Series M was one of the first mass-market British cars to feature an OHV engine and the Morris was praised for the smoothness, efficiency and quiet-running of its engine. The car had a top speed of around 62 miles per hour (100 km/h). The running gear was otherwise very conventional, even old-fashioned, for the time, with solid axles with longitudinal leaf springs all-round. Plans had been drawn up to provide the unitary-construction Ten with independent front suspension and Rack and pinion steering, but these were shelved due to cost and marketing concerns, although the parts designed for the Series M would appear in the post-war MG Y-type saloon.

Only saloon bodies with optional sun roof were made for the civilian market but a range of pick up bodies were fitted during World War II as one of among many similar products by British manufactures collectively known by the nickname "Tillies". The car was also assembled in India as the Hindustan 10 .

Postwar models can be distinguished from those made before late 1945 by a cosmetic change to the radiator grille, the later versions being rounder, faired in to the engine side panels and without the Morris badge at the top.

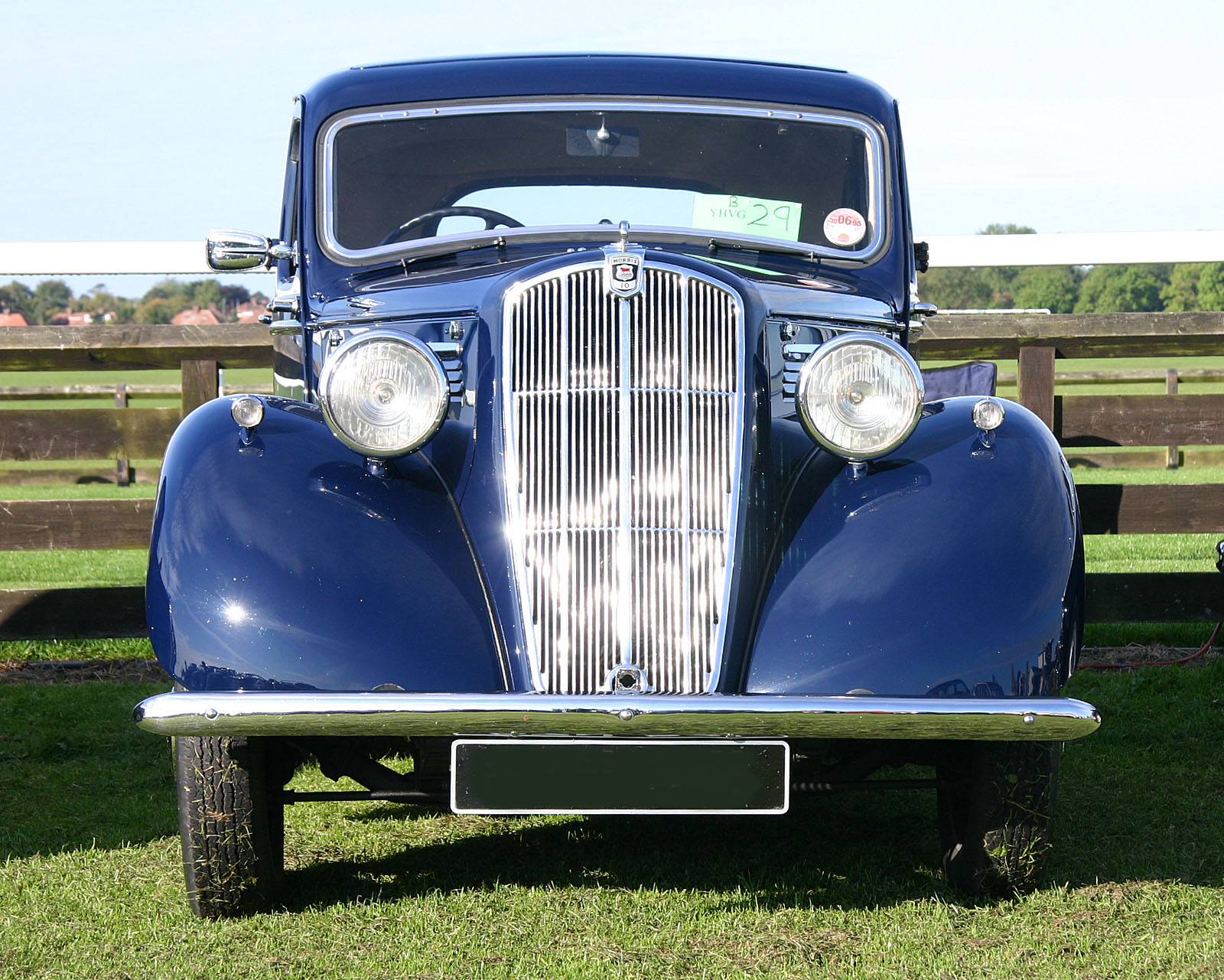
Pre-war Ten Series M

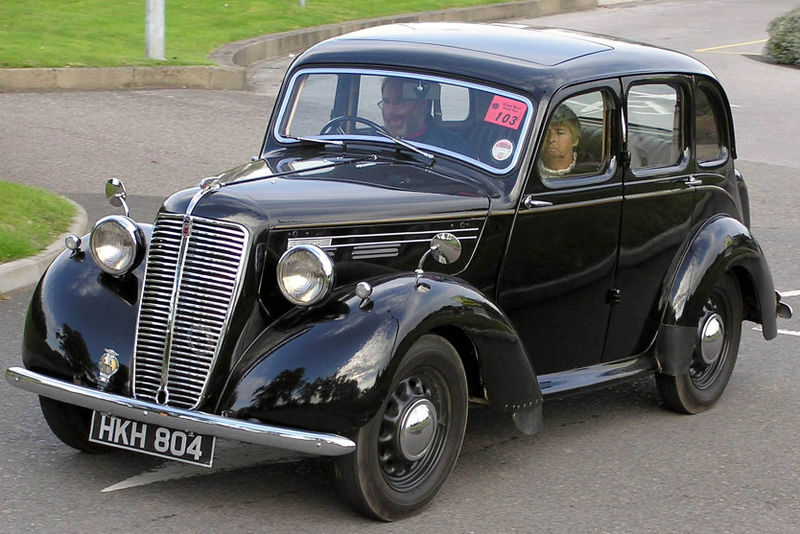
Postwar car with new grille
