= Bishop Cam steering box =

A Bishop Cam steering box was a simple but adequate screw and follower design of steering box for vehicles. It took its name from being manufactured by a special method of cutting steering gears which had been patented by Reginald Bishop of London in the early 1920s. It was made in England by Cam Gears Limited of Luton later known as TRW Cam Gears Limited.

Used by most quantity-produced British small cars from the 1920s to the 1950s the boxes were manufactured for Cam Gears by their Luton associate George Kent Ltd. Kent's main business was the manufacture of instruments, controls and meters measuring the flow of liquids.

In the early 1950s George Kent and Cam Gears together formed a power-steering manufacturing business and named it Hydrosteer.
