= Ames (surname) =

The surname Ames is usually either French, English or German in origin. The French name comes from the noun amie, meaning a friend or a beloved. The surname also derives from the Old French and Middle English personal name Amys or Amice, the Latin amicus, or from a Late Latin derivative of this, Amicius. The German roots of the name could have come from the Old High German word amazzig, meaning "busy," as a nickname for an active person. The name also has connections to the modern German name Ameise, meaning “ant".

Variations of the surname include Aames, Amass, Amess, Amies, Amis, Amiss, Amos, Hames, Haymes, Eames, and others. The name may also be a contraction of Ambrose.

The Ames family is an old and notable family in the United States.

== People with the surname ==
- A. A. Ames (1842–1911), American physician and politician
- Aaron D. Ames, American engineering researcher and academic
- Adelaide Ames (1900–1932), American astronomer, co-author of the Shapley-Ames Catalog
- Adelbert Ames (1835–1933), American Civil War general
- Adelbert Ames Jr. (1880–1955), American scientist
- Adrienne Ames (1907–1947), American film actress
- Aldrich Ames (1941–2026), American convicted spy for the Soviet Union
- Alfred Elisha Ames (1814–1874), American physician and politician
- August Ames (1994–2017), Canadian pornographic actress
- Azel Ames (1845–1908), American physician, author, and public health authority
- Blanche Ames Ames (1878–1969), American artist, inventor, writer, and supporter of women's suffrage and birth control
- Blanche Butler Ames (1847–1939), wife of Gen. Adelbert
- Bruce Ames (1928–2024), American biochemist
- Cheney Ames (1808–1892), American politician from New York
- David Ames (disambiguation), several people
- DeHart H. Ames (1872–1955), American politician from New York
- Ed Ames (1927–2023), American singer and actor
- Eleanor Maria Easterbrook Ames (1831–1908), American writer, publisher
- Eli B. Ames (1820–1898), American politician from Minnesota
- Ezra Ames (1768–1836), American portraitist
- Fisher Ames (1758–1808), American politician from Massachusetts
- Frederick Lothrop Ames (1835–1893), American railroad tycoon
- Frederick Lothrop Ames Jr. (1876–1921), American financier and socialite from Massachusetts, son of the above
- Herman Vandenburg Ames (1865–1935), American historian
- Hermes L. Ames (1865–1920), American politician from New York
- James Ames (disambiguation), several people
- John Ames (disambiguation), several people
- Jonathan Ames (born 1964), American author
- Joseph Ames (disambiguation), several people
- Julia A. Ames (1816–1891), American journalist, editor, reformer
- Leon Ames (1902–1993), American actor
- Lydia May Ames (1863–1940), American painter
- Les Ames (1905–1990), English cricketer
- Mary C. Ames (1831–1884), American journalist, author, poet
- Nathaniel Ames (1708–1764), American almanac maker
- Nadine Ames (born 1991), Indonesian actress and model
- Oakes Ames (1804–1873), American manufacturer and politician from Massachusetts
- Oakes Ames (botanist) (1874–1950), American botanist
- Oakes Angier Ames (1829–1899), American industrialist and philanthropist from Massachusetts
- Oliver Ames (disambiguation), several people
- Rachel Ames (born 1929), American actress
- Ramsay Ames (1919–1998), American movie actress
- Red Ames (1882–1936), American baseball pitcher
- Roger Ames (born 1942), American Anglican priest
- Roger T. Ames, Canadian sinologist, linguist, and translator
- Roy Ames (1937–2003), American record producer and sex offender
- Rosemary Ames (1906–1988), American film actress
- Samuel Ames (1824–1875), American politician from New York
- Samuel Ames (jurist), American jurist from Rhode Island
- Solace Ames, American writer
- Stephen Ames (born 1964), Trinidad and Tobago and Canada golfer
- William Ames (1576–1633), English theologian
- William Ames (Quaker) (died 1662), English preacher
- Winthrop Ames (1870–1937), American producer and playwright; son of Oakes Angier
- The Ames Brothers, 20th-century American singing quartet
