= Ames =

Ames may refer to:

== Businesses and organizations ==
- Ames (automobile), an early American automobile manufacturer
- Ames Department Stores, a defunct discount store chain based in Connecticut, U.S.
- Ames Manufacturing Company, an American manufacturer of swords, tools and cutlery
- Ames Research Center, NASA research center in California, U.S.
- Ames National Laboratory, United States Department of Energy laboratory
- Ames True Temper, a multinational manufacturer of non-powered lawn and garden products
- Academy for Math, Engineering, and Science (AMES) in Salt Lake City, Utah, U.S.

== People ==
- Ames (surname), including a list of people with the name
- Ames family, a prominent family of the United States

== Places ==
=== United States ===
- Ames, Arkansas, a place in Arkansas
- Ames, Colorado
- Ames, Illinois
- Ames, Iowa, the most populous city bearing this name
- Ames, Kansas
- Ames, Nebraska
- Ames, New York
- Ames Township, Athens County, Ohio
- Ames, Oklahoma
- Ames, Texas
- Ames, West Virginia

=== Other places ===
- Ames, Pas-de-Calais, France
- Ames, Spain
- Ames Range, a mountain range in Antarctica

== Other uses ==
- Ames, standard author abbreviation in botany for Oakes Ames
- AMES, Air Ministry Experimental Station, the basis for naming British radar systems through World War 2

== See also ==
- Ames Airport (disambiguation)
- Ames Building (disambiguation)
- Amesville, Ohio, U.S.
- Amesdale, Ontario, Canada
- Amesbury (disambiguation)
- Amess, a surname
- Apparent mineralocorticoid excess syndrome, or AME
- Eames (disambiguation)
