= Amis =

Amis may refer to:

- Amis (surname)
- Amis people (or Amis), a tribe of Taiwanese aborigines
- Amis language, an indigenous language of Taiwan
- AMIS (ISP), an Internet service provider (ISP) in Slovenia and Croatia
- Amis et Amiles, an old French romance
- A work-alike version of Emacs for VAX

The acronym AMIS may stand for:

- Association for Music in International Schools, an association "dedicated to the promotion of excellence in all levels of music education."
- African Union Mission in Sudan (AMIS)
- American Musical Instrument Society (AMIS)
- AMI Semiconductor, designer and manufacturer of silicon chips
- Atari Message Information System, a bulletin board system for 8-bit Atari computers
- Audio Messaging Interchange Specification, a method to move messages from one voice mail system to another
- Alternate Multiplex Interrupt Specification, a method of sharing a software interrupt by many TSR programs
- Abandoned Mines Information System, a database containing abandoned and inactive mines in Ontario, Canada
- Agricultural Market Information System, an initiative by the G20 states to analyse and forecast the situation on the global agricultural market
