= Aamer =

Aamer or Amer is a name, used both as a surname and given name. Notable people with the name include:

== Aamer as surname ==
- Ali Aamer (born 1977), Bahraini footballer
- Mohamed Aamer (born 1986), Egyptian actor
- Mohammad Aamer (born 1995), Pakistani cricketer
- Najeeb Amar (born 1971), Pakistani cricketer
- Shaker Aamer (born 1966), Saudi Arabian Guantanamo prisoner

== Aamer as given name ==
- Aamer Ali (born 1978), Omani cricketer
- Aamer Anwar (born 1967), British lawyer
- Aamer Bashir (1972–2010), Pakistani cricketer
- Aamer Farooq (born 1969), Pakistani jurist
- Aamer Gul (born 1974), Pakistani cricketer
- Aamer Hameed (born 1954), Pakistani cricketer
- Aamer Hanif (born 1967), Pakistani cricketer
- Aamer Hayat (born 1982), Pakistani cricketer
- Aamer Hussein (born 1955), Pakistani writer
- Aamer Iqbal (born 1973), Pakistani cricketer
- Aamer Ishaq (born 1971), Pakistani cricketer
- Aamer Khan (born 1969), English cricketer
- Aamer Khurshid (born 1967), Pakistani cricketer
- Aamer Majeed (born 1969), Pakistani cricketer
- Aamer Malik (born 1963), Pakistani cricketer
- Aamer Nazir (born 1966), Pakistani cricketer
- Aamer Nazir (born 1971), Pakistani cricketer
- Aamer Rahman (born 1982), Australian comedian
- Aamer Sajjad (born 1981), Pakistani cricketer
- Aamer Sohail (born 1966), Pakistani cricketer
- Aamer Sohail (born 1972), Pakistani cricketer
- Aamer Yousuf (born 1985), Pakistani cricketer
- Raja Aamer Zaman, Pakistani politician
