= Color Climax Corporation =

Danish pornography producer

Color Climax
- Type: ApS
- Industry: Pornography
- Founded: 1967; 59 years ago
- Founder: Peter Theander; Jens Theander
- Headquarters: Copenhagen, Denmark
- Products: Pornographic films, pornographic magazines

Color Climax Corporation ApS (CCC) was a Danish pornography producer headquartered in Copenhagen. It was founded in 1967 by the Theander brothers and began with the publication of the porn magazine ColorClimax, despite pornography being illegal in Denmark until 1969. It was one of the leading producers of European pornography up until the 1990s.

== Films ==
In 1969, Denmark legalized the production of all kinds of pornography. In the 1970s, CCC began to produce 8 mm pornographic film loops. By the 1980s, video tape had replaced the film loops, sometimes as compilations of previously released material. CCC films usually had a wider range of contents including bestiality, some of which last starred Bodil Joensen, and other content not widely available at the time. Urolagnia was also displayed. By 2004, Color Climax had past film stars such as Rocco Siffredi and John Holmes in their archives on their website and Raymond Bacharach also known as John Thompson was part of the backstage crew.

== Child pornography ==
Color Climax was the first to produce commercial child pornography films. From 1969 to 1979, Color Climax was responsible for the relatively large-scale distribution of child pornography. Danish laws on pornography had been totally repealed since 1969, only punishing with modest fines those making obscene material with children.

Between 1971 and 1979, the company produced 10-minute films for its Lolita series. These films featured young girls, mainly with men, but sometimes with women or other children. The girls were mainly between the ages of 7 and 11 years; however, some were younger. These movies had titles such as Incest Family, Child Love and Pre-Teen Sex.

== Magazines ==
CCC was also known for its magazine series with titles such as Color Climax and Rodox. In their day, these were regarded as some of the best quality pornographic magazines in Europe. This was the case particularly in the UK, where prior to the year 2000, the sale of hardcore porn was illegal. Before this date some British sex shops sold softcore British magazines in plastic packaging, with a Rodox or Color Climax front cover on the outside. The same shops sometimes sold watered-down reproductions of CCC titles, with any hardcore images removed. CCC magazines presented a wide variety of European and American stars. Photo-sets typically began with the models fully clothed, and ended with an image of male ejaculation, a storyline shared with other Danish magazines of the period such as Fucking and Con Amore. Many of those photos remained available as of the middle of May 2014 via the Color Climax website, and they were also circulated widely—though they were so circulated in violation of copyright—around the Internet via file-sharing networks and other sources. Still photographs from the Lolita film series were also published in Color Climax magazines. By 2006, the company had published over 3,000 different books and magazines with a total of over 140 million editions; 8.5 million films, and almost a million video cassettes.

=== Magazine titles ===
Initially, the company published various one-off magazines with titles such as Carnaby Kinks, Young Lesbians, and Fuck Around the Clock before settling on a series of numbered titles. These were produced in A5 format, consisted of full-color photographs, and typically featured five or six photo sets of around ten pages each; each set would be accompanied by a short descriptive text. While not all the titles ran concurrently, subject matter from magazine to magazine frequently overlapped. Many themes, such as big bust, interracial, uniform, or ethnically themed sets would appear in any title, dependent on the activity being performed rather than the participants.

- Color Climax—mixture of hardcore and softcore picture sets. First published in April 1968.
- Danish Hard Core (later Hard Core)—conventional hardcore pictures featuring male and female participants.
- Teenage Sex—teenage girls in softcore and hardcore picture sets. Later joined by the similarly themed Teenage School Girls.
- Blue Climax—mixture of hardcore and softcore picture sets.
- Rodox—mixture of hardcore and softcore picture sets.
- Anal Sex—hardcore picture sets focusing on anal intercourse and double penetration. First published in 1970.
- Exciting—mixture of hardcore and softcore picture sets.
- New Cunts—hardcore picture sets, initially focusing on female models with shaved genitalia.
- Sex Bizarre—hardcore picture sets focusing on water sports and, in earlier issues, scat.
- Lesbian Love—girl-on-girl sets.
- Transsexual Love—mixture of hardcore and softcore sets of male-to-female transgender models, usually paired with male models in oral and anal intercourse.
- Animal Lover—bestiality magazine, usually featuring female–animal pairings.
- Erotic Desire—along with Pussycat and Sexual Fantasy, a reprint title with a budget price reprinting edited sets and selections from older magazines.
- Cover Girls—along with Sexy Girls, printed softcore solo sets featuring female models.

In the mid-1990s, the magazine titles were sold to the German studio Silwa, which continued them with their own in-house picture sets featuring similar scenes.

== Notable models ==
Notable Color Climax models:

=== 1968–1979 ===
- Anne Magle was a very prominent Danish adult actress of Scandinavian descent who appeared in film during the late 1970s.
- Bill the Bull is an African American regular for a short period who was known for his large penis size. He is also noted among fans as a pioneer of interracial pornography.
- Bodil Joensen was a Danish adult actress known for sexual performances with animals.
- Of Swedish heritage, Dawn Knudsen was an American adult model and early 8mm film.
- Dorrit is a semi-regular adult model and actress.
- Jannie Nielson (also known as Inger) is a Danish adult model and actress.
- Janet Monroe (also known as Nelly) was one of the few popular British models.
- John Holmes was a male favorite known for his larger than average penis size.
- Popular Mexican American film actress, Kitten Natividad.
- Former French erotic and pornographic actress, Marilyn Jess.
- Louise Frevert is a former elected member of the Danish parliament who is often confused with a popular regular model, nicknamed Lene.
- Milton Reid was an Indian-born British actor and professional wrestler who appeared in non-sexual roles in a couple of hardcore films including Arabian Knights, shot in London in 1979 and released by the company.
- Rene Bond was a famous pornographic actress of the late 1960s through early 1970s.
- Horny Rob (Robert M. of Holland) is known for his website HornyRob.com.
- Often held as the early company mascot, Tove Jensen, best known as "Tiny Tove", is a Swedish adult actress who was active between 1979 and 1981. Renowned for adolescent appearance, she was allegedly introduced to the sex industry by her mother.

=== 1980–1989 ===
The 1980s brought about more famous models and magazine regulars than the previous decade. Readers of the magazines saw likes of many American and European renowned figures of the adult industry. These include actors like Blondi Bee, Dolly Buster, Ebony Ayes, Roberto Malone, Lois Ayres, Jean-Pierre Armand, Ginger Lynn, Brigitte Lahaie, Joy Karins, Jeannie Pepper, and Bunny Bleu.

- Astrid Pils is one of the few popular Austrian adult actresses.
- Bärbel von Staden (also known as Barbara Legrand) is a notable fan favorite.
- Barbara is one of there most celebrated fan favorites from Germany.
- Ben Dover is an English adult actor, director and producer.
- Christine Leval is a former German pornographic actress renowned for often performing threesomes with two male partners.
- Eileen Daly is an English actress, filmmaker, and singer-songwriter. She is also a contemporary scream queen and fronts her own band.
- Catherine Ringer is a French singer best known as the frontwoman of Les Rita Mitsouko. She is also one of the few notably actresses to perform coprophilia for one of their fetish magazines; Sex Bizarre Magazine #29.
- Ginger was one of the first popular trans models during this era which implemented the first Transexual Magazines.
- Joey Murphy (also known as Joachim) is a former European adult actor renowned for his attractive appearance.
- Kim Barry (also known as Anja) is a well-known face among fans and credited as a "Readers Top 10" subject.
- Natalia Mühlhausen (also known as Jacqueline Dessin or Mistress Natalia) is a known fetish model and professional BDSM performer.
- Rocco Siffredi is among the most popular Italian adult actors and a highly credited regular.
- Sally (also known as Jamaican Diane) is British adult actress of Haitian nationality. As one of the few popular women of African descent, she is renowned for her large bust size.
- Sodiroulla Turner (also known as Mandy), often shorten as "Sooty", is a prominent English fan favorite known for her large bust.
- Solange Lecarrio (also known as Solange Hop) is a fan favorite of Eurasian (French and Vietnamese) descent.
- "Readers Top 10" are highlighted models prompted by their popularity among fans and/or photographers. Models on record include: Bill The Bull (from Blue Climax Magazine #50), Thai Girl-Hunt (from Blue Climax Magazine #51), Tiny Tove(from Blue Climax Magazine #52), John Holmes (from Blue Climax Magazine #53), Sally: the Queen of Tits (from Blue Climax Magazine #54), Mikki: a wet dream girl (from Blue Climax Magazine #55), Anja: The Perfect Model (from Blue Climax Magazine #56), and Nelly An English Erotic Rose (from Blue Climax Magazine #57).
- Toni Kessering (also known as Titanic Toni) was a prolific English adult actress renowned for her large bust.
- Veronica Moser was a fetish model and adult actress best known for her work within the coprophilia fanbase.

=== 1990–1999 ===
Much like the 1980s, the 1990s ushered famous models and magazine regulars such as Anita Blond, Nick East, Angelica Bella, Angelique dos Santos (also known as Busty Angelique), Tom Byron, Heather Lee, Sarah Young, Minka, Laura Angel, Lisa Marie Abato, Domonique Simone, and Sean Michaels.

- Anna Marek (also known as Anuschka Marek) is a former Polish adult actress often helm as the company mascot following Tove Jensen. She was one of the first popular pornographic figures on the Internet, prompted through a series of scanned images of her posted as early as 1992.
- Emy George is a Dutch pornographic actress known for group sex performances.
- Dina Pearl is a Hungarian fan favorite.
- Gina Colany is a former German adult actress known for group sex performances.
- Jacqueline Wild is another Hungarian fan favorite.
- Jay Sweet is semi-regular Irish adult model and actress.
- Tiffany Walker is another Irish regular.

=== 2000–2007 ===
By the 21st century, the company's performers were mostly European models, including Julia Taylor, Laura Lion, Sandra Russo, Danielle Rush, Daria Glower, and Sandy Style.

- German adult actress Vivian Schmitt is often held as a promotional figure for the company's site when it was owned by Silwa with Videorama as distributor of content.
- Kyla Cole is a Slovak glamour model, adult model, and former television presenter who was also used as promotional model for the website during Silwa's acquisition of the company.

== See also ==
- Animal Farm (video)
