= Xabier Ron =

Spanish politician and child sex offender

Xosé Xabier Ron Fernández
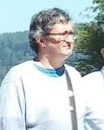
- Born: February 14, 1969 (age 57); Lyon, France
- Other name: Xabier Ron
- Citizenship: Spanish
- Occupations: Teacher, politician, translator
- Known for: Politician; convicted of sexually abusing a minor and transmitting syphilis
- Political party: Communist Party of Galicia
- Other political affiliations: United Left

Xosé Xabier Ron Fernández (born 14 February 1969 in Lyon, France) is a Spanish teacher, politician, translator and child sex offender who served as a member of the Parliament of Galicia. In 2026 he was sentenced to nine and a half years in prison for repeatedly sexually assaulting a 12-year-old student and infecting her with syphilis.

== Career ==
Born in France to Galician emigrant parents, Ron returned to Galicia and earned a degree in Romance Philology from the University of Santiago de Compostela. From 2016 he worked as a French-language teacher at IES de Ames, and from September 2024 at IES Breamo in Pontedeume. He specialized in the poetry of the Romance troubadours, particularly the Galician-Portuguese songbook, which was the subject of his 2016 doctoral thesis, Fenomenoloxía do don na lírica románica das primeiras xeracións, supervised by Mercedes Brea López.

He was a member of the Communist Party of Galicia and served on its Central Committee; he was also a member of the executive committee of United Left, where he held the role of Secretary for Social Movements and regional coordinator in Santiago de Compostela. Involved in Galician emigrant advocacy, he was a member of the Galician Immigration Forum from its founding.

He was United Left's candidate for mayor of Santiago de Compostela in the 2007 and 2011 Galician municipal elections, and headed the list for the Province of A Coruña in the 2008 Spanish general election. He was elected to the Parliament of Galicia in the 2012 Galician regional election as a member of Galician Left Alternative (AGE).

Xabier Ron was also politically linked to Yolanda Díaz, with whom he shared a parliamentary group in Galicia and years of collaboration within the left-wing coalition AGE.

=== Conviction ===
Ron was arrested on 28 January 2025 and placed in pre-trial detention the following day at Teixeiro Prison on charges of sexually assaulting a minor. Court findings established that between July and November 2024, Ron, who at the time was her teacher, engaged in a series of encounters with a 12-year-old student that escalated into repeated sexual assaults involving sadomasochistic practices, in which he cast himself as "master" and the victim as his "slave," forcing her to wear a submissive collar; these assaults also resulted in the transmission of syphilis to the victim.

On 1 July 2026, following a plea agreement between the prosecution, private and popular accusations, and the defense, the Provincial Court of A Coruña sentenced Ron to nine and a half years in prison. He was also ordered to pay the victim's family €82,000 in compensation, barred from approaching or contacting the victim for nineteen and a half years, disqualified from working with minors for fifteen years, and made subject to ten years of supervised release following his sentence.

== Works ==
- Os exilios que somos, a collection of photographs and poems co-authored with Irene Tomé (Alvarellos, 2020).

== Translations ==
- Morte en Arán, by Tòni Escala (Hugin e Munin, 2019).
- Morrerei outro día, by Isabelle Alonso, co-translated with Isabel Soto (Hugin e Munin, 2020).
- Diario dunha sufraxista, by Nicole Cadène (Edicións Laiovento, 2024).

== Essays ==
- En transición. Europa y los retos de la representatividad (Catarata, 2020)
