= The Dark Side of Porn =

British documentary series (2005–2006)

- Narrated by: Christopher Eccleston
- Country of origin: United Kingdom
- No. of seasons: 2
- No. of episodes: 9

Production
- Running time: 50 minutes
- Production company: Lion Television

Original release
- Network: Channel 4
- Release: 25 April 2005 – 19 April 2006

The Dark Side of Porn is a documentary series that examines the adult entertainment industry. It was produced by Lion Television for Channel 4 in the United Kingdom between 25 April 2005 and 19 April 2006. The series is produced and directed by a different person for each episode, and narrated by Christopher Eccleston.

== Episodes ==
=== Season 1 (2005) ===
No.	Title	Original release date
1	"Porn Shutdown"	25 April 2005
Darren James was diagnosed with HIV in early 2004, which led to a two-month shutdown of the adult movie industry in Los Angeles. Featuring Sharon Mitchell, founder of the Adult Industry Medical Health Care Foundation and Rob Black, producer of gonzo pornography.
2	"Diary of a Porn Virgin"	26 April 2005
This episode gives an insight in the lives of newcomers to the adult entertainment. From the initial approach to a glamour agency and the first sexy photo-shoot to the HIV test, the audition and the first hardcore shoot, it shows the gritty reality of what working in the pornographic industry means in Britain today. Narrated by Andrea Oliver.
3	"Debbie Does Dallas Uncovered"	27 April 2005
Also known as The Curse of Debbie Does Dallas, in the vein of Inside Deep Throat, it examines the history of the production and marketing of the 1978 cult hit Debbie Does Dallas, and is a study of the porn industry in the 1970s. Interviews with former porn stars also try to uncover the mystery of Bambi Woods, the starlet who disappeared from the industry soon after Debbie Does Dallas and was rumoured to have connections with the mafia and problems with the FBI. Featuring interviews with Robin Byrd, female actress in the movie and Bill Kelly, a former FBI agent once working on an undercover operation to bust pornographic producers.
4	"Death of a Porn Star"	28 April 2005
This episode examines the mystery surrounding the death of Lolo Ferrari. Featuring candid interviews with Lolo's mother, her plastic surgeon and her husband. Narrated by Jamie Glover.

=== Season 2 (2006) ===
No. overall	No. in season	Title	Original release date
5	1	"Amateur Porn"	10 April 2006
This episode examines what is going on in the British sex industry, where new male actors are lining up to do a job without getting paid.
6	2	"Me and My Slaves"	11 April 2006
This episode is centered around "Rick", a professional BDSM Master who wants to quit the job after doing it for 25 years. Over a period of more than a year, Rick talks intimately about his life.
7	3	"Hunting Emmanuelle"	12 April 2006
This episode examines the cultural impact of the movie Emmanuelle. Featuring an interview with Sylvia Kristel.
8	4	"Does Snuff Exist?"	18 April 2006
This episode investigates the truth behind snuff movies. It features the 1997 German case where Ernst Dieter Korzen and Stefan Michael Mahn kidnapped a prostitute and recorded her torture. Narrated by Ian Michie. It includes an interview with British detective superintendent Michael Hames.
9	5	"The Real Animal Farm"	19 April 2006
Looks into the story behind bestiality porn movies, and discusses the notorious Animal Farm video. Several interviewees, including David Kerekes (co-author of Killing For Culture and See No Evil), author Phil Tonge, feminist writer Germaine Greer and British pornographer Ben Dover, all admitted to having seen bootlegs of Animal Farm in the 1980s, but were apparently unaware that there was no such film — the entity referred to as such was merely a number of existing bestiality shorts tacked together. The documentary also told the story of Bodil Joensen, a psychologically traumatized young woman whose brief notoriety as the "Queen of Bestiality" was followed by a downward spiral of alcohol abuse and prostitution before her death of cirrhosis of the liver at the age of forty, and featured an interview with the Danish pornographer Ole Ege. Narrated by John Simm.
