= Animal Farm (video) =

British underground pornographic film

Animal Farm is the street name given to an underground pornographic film containing scenes of explicit bestiality that was smuggled into Great Britain in the late 1970s or early 1980s. Most of the films starred the Danish performer Bodil Joensen.

== History ==
In the early 1980s, during the British home video boom, a videocassette of indeterminate origin began to circulate in underground circles that became known simply as Animal Farm. It contained a plotless series of extremely graphic scenes of zoophilia, including acts of intercourse and fellatio performed with pigs, horses and even chickens (avisodomy), as well as a scene in which a woman inserts live eels into her vagina. Animal Farm remains one of the most controversial videotapes ever to find its way to British shores.

The material that constitutes the Animal Farm bootleg was apparently smuggled through British Customs in the Spring of 1981 by a tourist. It found its way under the counters of various Soho stockists and was eventually prosecuted following a series of police raids — but not before countless bootlegs had gone into circulation. It was discovered that the video actually comprised several short X-rated films from the Danish company Color Climax Corporation, which had been producing a steady stream of extreme pornography since the Danish government made all pornography legal in 1969. To keep up with the growing demand for video titles, Color Climax had taken to transferring their stocks of 8 mm and 16 mm animal films onto cassette, and it was these films — mostly starring Bodil Joensen — that composed the Animal Farm video, hence its generic title (which at no point appears on the screen) and shadowy origins. It is possible that some of the material was taken from Alex de Renzy's cash-in feature Animal Lover (1971), which actually managed a brief cinema run in San Francisco, and whose entire second half consists of the "distinctively amateurish, shaky, clumsily-shot lurid colour footage" familiar to anyone who has seen Animal Farm.

== TV documentary ==
In April 2006, the UK station Channel 4 screened a 50-minute documentary, "The Real Animal Farm", as part of their The Dark Side of Porn season. Several interviewees, including David Kerekes (co-author of Killing for Culture and See No Evil), author Phil Tonge, feminist writer Germaine Greer and British pornographer Ben Dover, all confessed to having seen bootlegs of Animal Farm in the 1980s. Tonge described the owner of the copy he saw as an "evil, evil scumbag" and recalled how several "hard lads" either "left the room" or "vomited", Dover remarked that owning the bootleg was useful in games of one-upmanship, since nothing could top the on-screen depravity of Joensen and her co-stars, and the normally easy-going Kerekes was moved to remark that "there's only so much filth you can wallow in ... and I think Animal Farm is pretty much at the bottom of the pit." Its impact on viewers was compared to that of hearing for the first time about the Kennedy assassination.

The documentary also recounted the life of Bodil Joensen, a psychologically traumatised young woman whose brief notoriety as the 'Queen of Bestiality' was followed by a downward spiral of alcohol abuse and prostitution before her death of cirrhosis of the liver at the age of 40, and featured an interview with the Danish pornographer Ole Ege. The 1970 documentary A Summerday apparently formed at least some of the content of the Animal Farm bootleg, having been shown at the "Wet Dreams" pornography film festival beforehand.
