= Henry Evered Haymes =

British surgeon

Captain and Bimbashi Henry Evered Haymes SBStJ MRCS LRCP
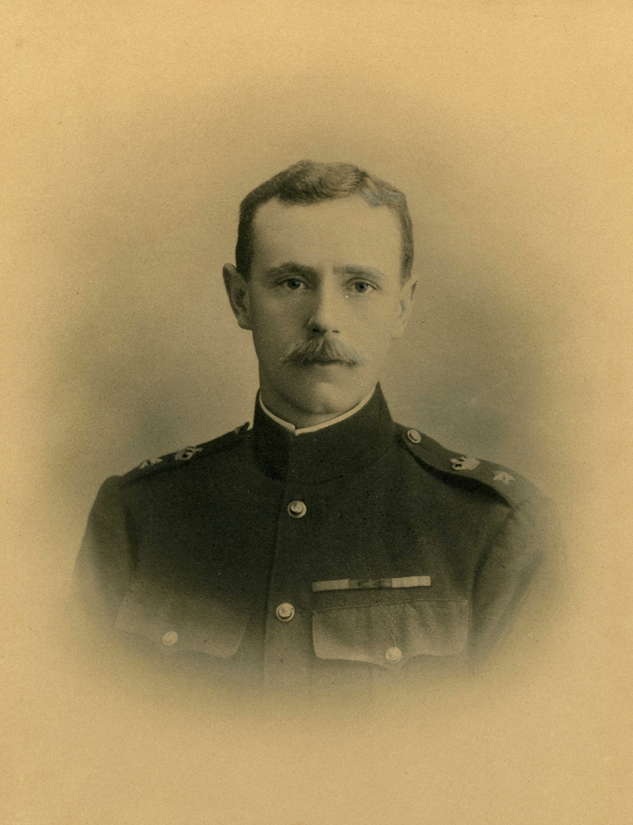
- Born: 17 March 1872
- Died: 15 March 1904 (aged 31)
- Relatives: Robert Leycester Haymes
- Military career
- Allegiance: United Kingdom
- Branch: British Army
- Service years: 1899–1904
- Rank: Captain and Bimbashi
- Unit: Royal Army Medical Corps

Captain and Bimbashi Henry Evered Haymes SBStJ MRCS LRCP (17 March 1872 – 15 March 1904), was a British surgeon in the Royal Army Medical Corps, known chiefly for his service in Egypt and the Sudan. He was Senior Medical Officer and one of the original explorers of the Bahr-el-Ghazal region in what is now South Sudan, instrumental in containing a cholera pandemic in Alexandria in 1902, and later Inspector of the Bahr el Ghazal.

== Early life ==
Henry Evered Haymes was born on 17 March 1872, the third son of the Rev. Robert Evered Haymes who was 17th in direct lineal descent from King Edward III. He was educated at Bedford Modern School, Oxford Military College and St Thomas's Hospital where he qualified as MRCS and LRCP in 1896. He was subsequently appointed House physician at the Royal Berkshire Hospital in Reading, Berkshire and, prior to entering the Royal Army Medical Corps, was Resident Medical Officer at the Eastern Counties Asylum in Colchester.

== Military life ==
Haymes entered the Royal Army Medical Corps on 28 January 1899 with a commission as Lieutenant, initially based at Netley where he attended to returning wounded soldiers from the South African War. He later joined the Egyptian Army at Khartoum (September 1899) where he looked after the wounded from battles in the Upper Sudan for which he was awarded the Khedive's Sudan Medal.

Toward the end of 1900, and as its Senior Medical Officer, Haymes joined an exploration party into the ‘virtually unknown Bahr-el-Gazal region under Miralai Sparkes Bey. The party consisted of five British officers and two British sergeants, 11 Egyptian officers, an interpreter, a clerk, 84 regulars, 266 irregulars and 216 wives and children. They also took 100 men and women rescued from slavery in Omdurman to be returned to their native tribes’. On 29 November 1900 the Bahr-el-Gazal exploration party left Khartoum on three steamers heading south along the White Nile.

Having crossed Lake No the steamers entered the Bahr-el-Ghazal river ‘which was spread out in a vast area of virtually impassable swamps covered by tall papyrus and thick vegetation, swarming with crocodile and hippopotami’. The party ‘pushed on down the river to Mashra-el-Rek, where Sparkes took Haymes and a detachment of soldiers to the Tueng river, about 120 miles and an eight-day hike away’. The village of Gor Ghattas was reached on New Year's Eve in 1900 and the British and Egyptian flags were raised ‘to the tune of the Khedival March’.

The party spent a year exploring the region attempting to assert government authority on the Dinka, Shulluk and Jur tribes and travelling further down the Bahr-el-Ghazal river to towns and villages as far south as the border with the Belgian Congo. Having established themselves in the province, the party was joined by further men and supplies helping to clear river routes, encourage trade and endeavouring to prevent slave trading, cattle rustling and general disputes between tribes.

Sparkes Bey contracted a fever at Waw whereupon it was decided to return to Khartoum by steamer. As a reward for his role in the exploration party in Bahr-el-Ghazal, Haymes was awarded the clasp ‘Bahr-el-Ghazal 1900–1902’ for his Khedives Sudan Medal.

Haymes was promoted to captain and later in 1902 travelled to Alexandria, where he ably helped control the cholera pandemic, which had claimed the lives of 35,000 people, and ‘did important sanitary medical work’. This was ‘the first attempt to fight a pandemic using modern thinking and techniques and shortly afterwards the outbreak was contained’.

Haymes returned to the Sudan, where he was selected by the Sirdar, Reginald Wingate (later Sir Reginald Wingate Bt GCB GCVO GBE KCMG DSO), for the appointment of Inspector of the Bahr-el-Ghazal Province. He ‘spent a year doing valuable work in surveying and boundary delimitation’ and also took up Big Game Hunting sending specimens of rarer animals back home to the British Museum.

He was admitted to the Venerable Order of St John as a Serving Brother in 1901 and awarded the Order of the Medjidie (4th Class) in 1902.

== The Nyam Nyam ambush ==
In February 1904, as Principal Medical Officer and Staff Officer, Haymes joined ‘a patrol of 100 men (with two Maxim machine guns) in an attempt to reopen negotiations with Chief Yambio’ and avenge the murder of a British officer, Captain Scott-Barbour. As the patrol:

‘approached Rikta’s village gunfire was suddenly opened up on them at a few yards range and almost simultaneously a number of spear and bowmen lying concealed in the Khor, charged the government troops. The result was hand-to-hand melee, from which the Nyam Nyam rapidly withdrew into the high grass with which the surrounding country was covered. The Maxims were quickly brought into action, and cleared the enemy from the high grass which was as soon as possible burnt. Bimbashi Haymes had received a dangerous gunshot wound in the head and one man of the XV Sudanese had been killed, whilst nine others were wounded, mostly by spears and arrows. The Nyam Nyam, who are said to have numbered about 50, left behind six dead’.

Haymes died of his head wounds at Tonj on 15 March 1904, just two days before his thirty-second birthday.
