= Aames =

Aames is a surname. Notable people with the surname include:

- Angela Aames (1956–1988), American actress
- David Aames, the main protagonist character of the film Vanilla Sky
- Willie Aames (born 1960), American actor, director, producer, and screenwriter

== See also ==
- Aamer
- Ames (surname)
- Deir Aames, a municipality in Southern Lebanon
- Eames
