= Haymes =

Haymes is a surname. Notable people with the surname include:

- Bob Haymes (1923–1989), American singer, songwriter, actor
- Bruce Haymes, Australian rock musician
- Dick Haymes (1918–1980), Argentine actor and singer
- Frederick Haymes (1849–1928), Australian cricketer
- Henry Evered Haymes (1872–1904), British surgeon
- Jerry Haymes (born 1940), American rock 'n roll artist
- Joe Haymes (1907–1964), American jazz bandleader
- Robert Leycester Haymes (1870–1942), Lieutenant-Colonel in the British Army

== See also ==
- Hames (disambiguation)
