= Amess =

Amess is a surname. Notable people with the surname include:

- David Amess (1952–2021), British politician
- Katie Amess (born 1985), English actress and model
- Ronald Amess (1927–2011), Australian ice hockey player
- Samuel Amess (1826–1898), Australian politician

== See also ==
- Ames (surname)
