= Amyes =

Amyes is a surname. Notable people with the surname include:

- Isabelle Amyes (born 1950), English actress
- Julian Amyes (1917–1992), British film and TV director and producer

== See also ==
- Amies
