= Oliver Ames =

Oliver Ames may refer to several members of the Massachusetts family:

- Oliver Ames Sr. (1779–1863), founder of the Ames Shovel Works
- Oliver Ames Jr. (1807–1877), his son, president of Union Pacific Railroad during the completion of the First Transcontinental Railroad in North America
- Oliver Ames (governor) (1831–1895), nephew of Oliver Ames, Jr., a U.S. political figure and financier, and 35th Governor of Massachusetts
- Oliver Ames High School, Easton Massachusetts

== See also ==
- Ames (surname)
