= Debbie Does Dallas =

1978 pornographic film

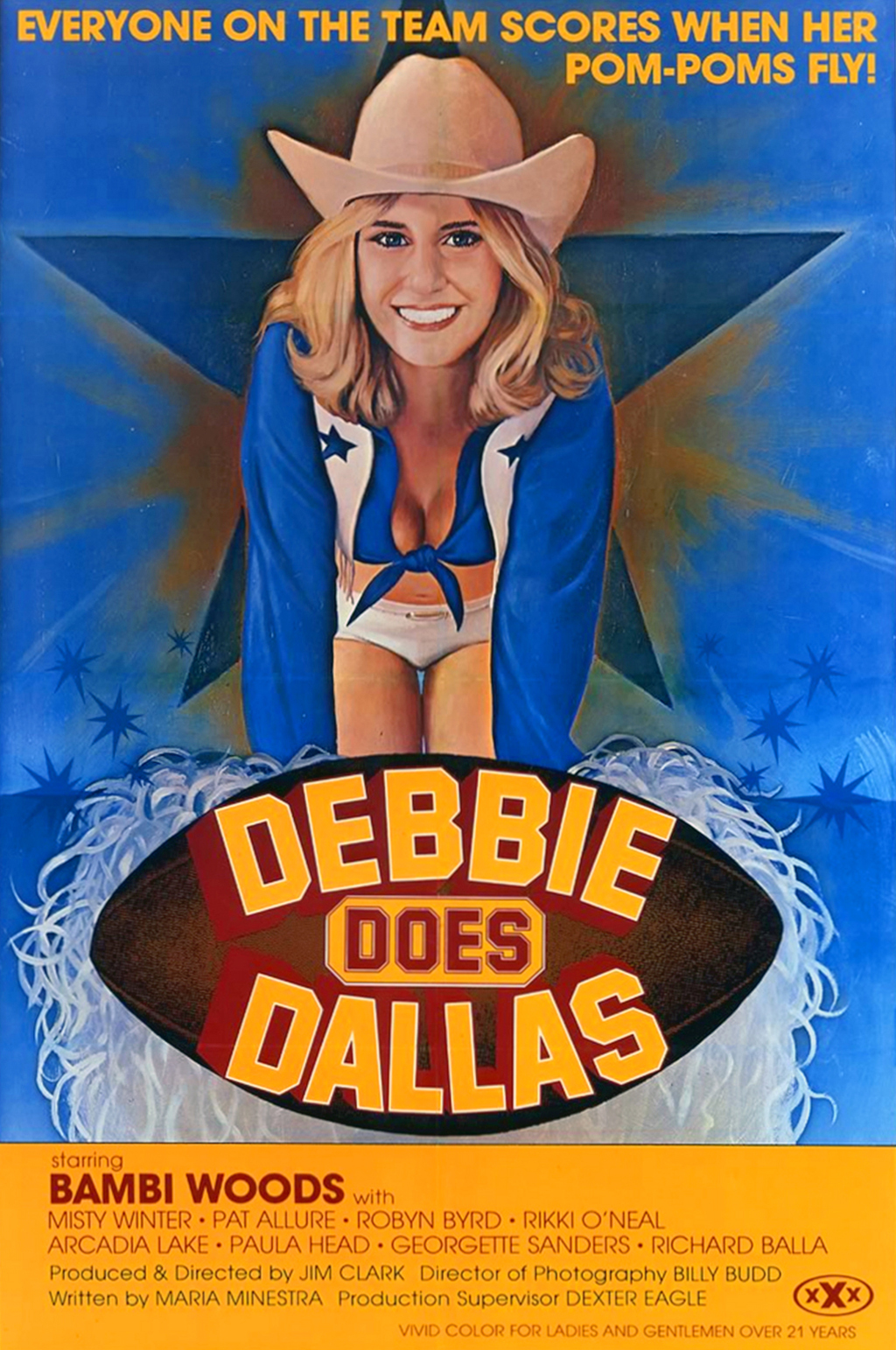
- Theatrical poster
- Directed by: David Buckley (credited as Jim Clark)
- Written by: David Buckley (credited as Maria Minestra)
- Produced by: David Buckley; Jim Buckley (credited solely to Jim Clark)
- Starring: Bambi Woods; Christie Ford; R. Bolla; Robin Byrd; Herschel Savage; Eric Edwards; Arcadia Lake
- Cinematography: Billy Budd
- Edited by: Hals Liptus
- Music by: Gerald Sampler
- Production company: School Day Films
- Distributed by: VCX
- Release date: November 19, 1978
- Running time: 84 minutes
- Country: United States
- Language: English

Debbie Does Dallas is a 1978 American pornographic film written, produced and directed by David Buckley (under the pseudonym Jim Clark), and starring Bambi Woods. The plot focuses on a team of cheerleaders attempting to earn enough money to send the title character to Dallas, Texas, to try out for the famous Texas Cowgirls cheerleading squad. The fictional name "Texas Cowgirls" was seen as an allusion to the real-life Dallas Cowboys Cheerleaders. Woods had previously tried out for the Dallas Cowboys Cheerleaders in real life, but she was cut during auditions.

The film was highly successful, selling 50,000 copies on videotape, making it the most successful pornographic video release of its time. As the film was first exhibited without a copyright notice, and due to the rights-holder's failure to comply with the US Copyright Act of 1976, it entered the public domain upon release, (Note: The film was shown in theaters without a copyright notice, which according to the Copyright Act of 1976, meant it could fall into the public domain if it wasn't registered within 5 years upon publication. VCX repeatedly asked the rights-holder to add the notice, to no avail, leading to the film losing copyright protection in 1982, confirmed via a court ruling in 1987.) which led to a number of spin-offs being made.

It is regarded as one of the most important releases during the so-called Golden Age of Porn (1969–1984), and became one of the best-known pornographic films of the 1980s. The enormous success spawned a number of sequels, and a 2002 off-Broadway musical of the same name.

== Plot ==
Debbie Does Dallas (1978)

Debbie Benton, captain of her high school cheerleading squad, has been accepted to try out for the Texas Cowgirls (based on the Dallas Cowboys Cheerleaders). Her parents disapprove and refuse to pay her fare to Texas. In a bid to help Debbie, her squadmates Lisa, Roberta, Tammy, Pat, and Annie decide to accompany her to Texas. With two weeks to raise the money, they swear off sexual activity with their boyfriends and form a company called Teen Services.

Tammy takes a job in the local record store run by Nick. Debbie gets a job at a sports store run by Mr. Greenfeld. Roberta convinces Mr. Hardwick to give her a job at the candle store with Mrs. Hardwick. Rikki and Annie agree to wash Mr. Bradly's car.

The football team is annoyed by a lack of sex. Roberta's boyfriend Rick and his teammates join Roberta and Pat in the showers, where they have group sex. While working for Mr. Greenfeld at the sports store, Debbie is talked into allowing Mr. Greenfeld to see her breasts for $10 and fondle her breasts for another $10. Then, he sucks them for an additional $20.

Realizing they will not be able to raise enough money by legitimate means, Debbie convinces the other girls to engage in sexual activities for more money. They agree, but only if it is on their terms.

After Roberta is caught masturbating by Mrs. Hardwick, Roberta engages in sexual activity with Mr. and Mrs. Hardwick, earning extra money. Rikki and Annie go to see Mr. Bradly, to wash his car. Mr. Bradly is not home, but they wash his car anyway. When Mr. Bradly returns home, he asks them in to dry off their wet clothes. They undress for him for $10 each. He performs cunnilingus on them, they each fellate him and then he has anal sex with Annie.

At the library, Donna flirts with Mr. Biddle, the librarian. Visiting her at work, her boyfriend Tim tries to have sex with her. She fellates him but is caught by Mr. Biddle. Donna allows him to spank her so he won't tell her parents. Hamilton and his friend Ashly are in the tennis club sauna after a tennis game, and Hamilton convinces Lisa to fellate him while Ashly penetrates her.

At the record store, Tammy has been avoiding Tony's advances; she calls Lisa, who joins them at the record store. Lisa offers Tony "anything" and she begins to fellate him, and then Tammy joins in, and he ejaculates on Tammy's breasts.

In the final scene, Debbie arrives at Mr. Greenfeld's store after hours, in a Texas Cowgirls uniform as he requested. Greenfeld, dressed in a green-and-white number 12 football jersey, reveals his dream of being the quarterback who makes love to the head cheerleader, and she obliges. She fellates him, and he fingers and performs cunnilingus on her. Then they engage in vaginal sex, first in the missionary position, then doggy style, and then with Debbie on top. They finish in the missionary position with Mr. Greenfeld pulling out right before ejaculating.

== Cast ==
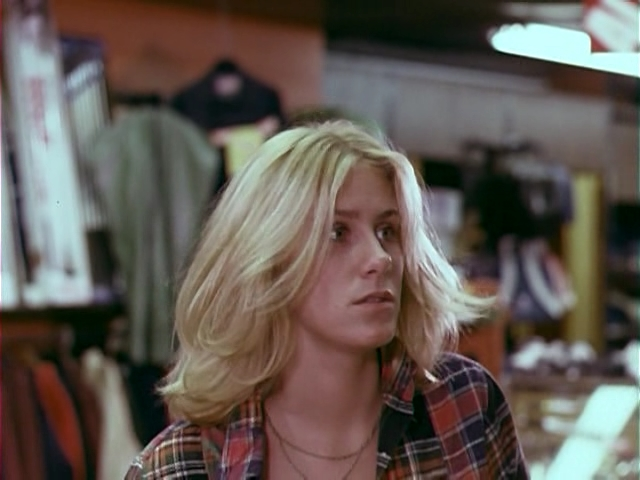
Bambi Woods as Debbie

- Bambi Woods as Debbie Benton
- Richard Balla as Mr. Greenfeld
- Christie Ford (as Misty Winter) as Roberta
- Robin Byrd as Mrs. Hardwick
- Eric Edwards as Mr. Hardwick
- Rikki O'Neal (as Sherri Tart) as Rikki
- Jenny Cole as Annie
- David Pierce (as David Suton) as Mr. Bradly
- Merle Michaels (as Merril Townsend) as Donna
- Jake Teague as Mr. Biddle
- Herschel Savage as Tim
- Georgette Sanders as Lisa
- Peter Lerman as Hamilton
- Ben Pierce as Ashly
- Arcadia Lake as Tammy
- Tony Mansfield as Nick
- David Morris as Rick
- Kasey Rodgers as Pat
- Debbie Lewis as Girl in Shower
- Steve Marshall as Boy in Shower
- Graham Silcock as "The other boy in the shower"

== Production ==
The movie was credited as being produced and directed by Jim Clark; a later production history published by The Rialto Report revealed David Buckley, brother of Screw magazine co-founder Jim Buckley, who also served as an uncredited producer. Some scenes were shot at the Brooklyn College athletic field and the Pratt Institute library in Brooklyn, New York. An urban legend claimed that certain scenes were shot at the State University of New York, Stony Brook, including the library scene. However, this was declared unlikely after an investigation with alumni, and the president of the film's distributor VCX called the rumor "purely inconclusive".

== Legal issues ==
=== Trademark ===
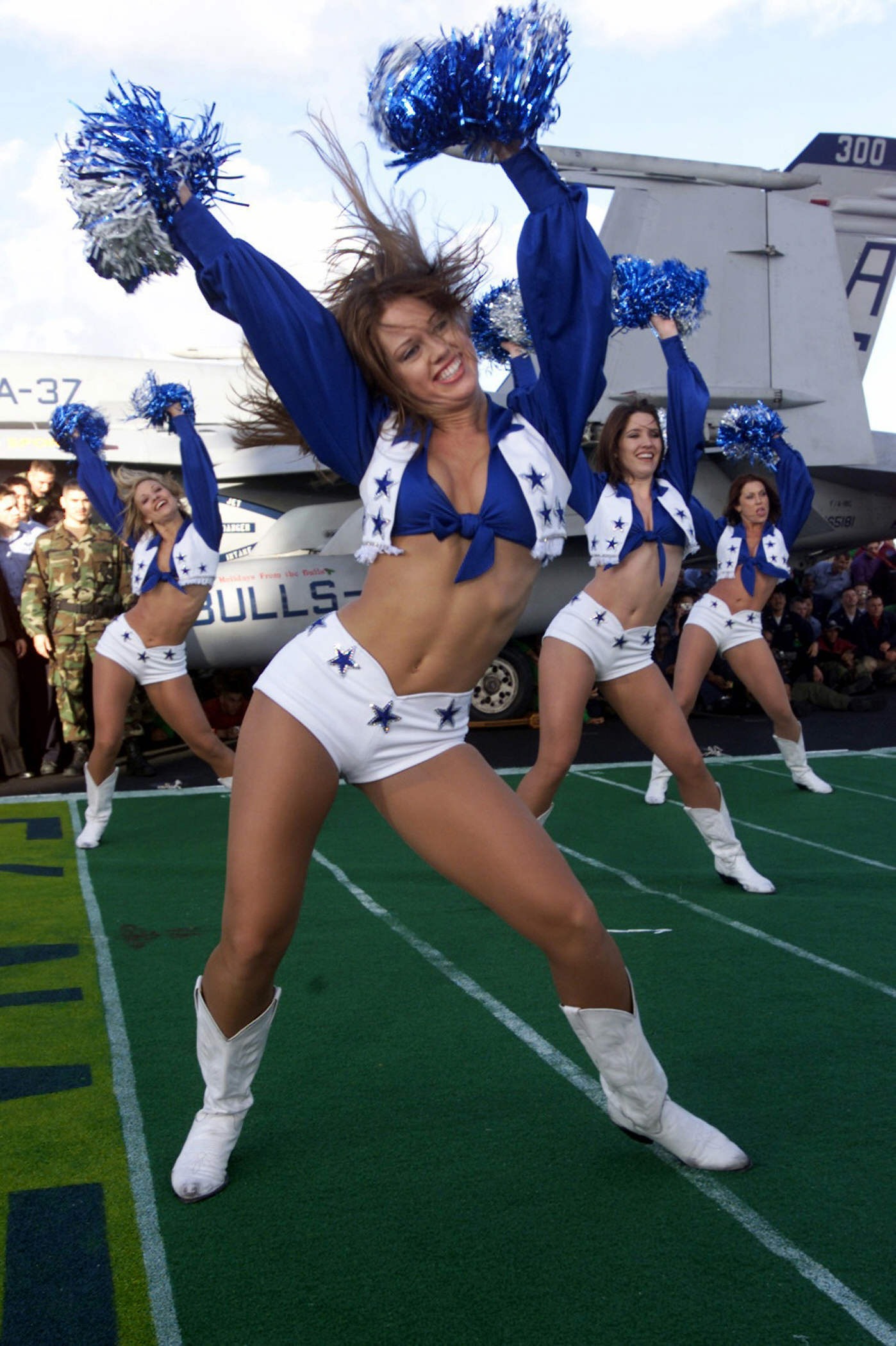
The Dallas Cowboys Cheerleaders in uniform

New York's Pussycat Theater was enjoined in 1979 from showing the film by the Dallas Cowboys Cheerleaders under the Lanham Act, arguing that their uniforms were mimicked by the film's producers and used in advertising, infringing on their trademarks. The theater argued that uniforms are strictly functional items, but in affirming the lower court's decision, the United States Court of Appeals for the Second Circuit found that "[i]t is well established that, if the design of an item is nonfunctional and has acquired secondary meaning, the design may become a trademark even if the item itself is functional." The decision has been criticized on free speech grounds, but the Seventh Circuit has cited it for the proposition that "confusion about sponsorship or approval, even when the mark does not mislead consumers about the source of the goods," may be sufficient to state a claim under Lanham Act 43(a).

=== Copyright status ===
When the film opened in October 1978, it was exhibited without a copyright notice. In 1979, rights-holder M & A Associates entered into an exclusive worldwide video distribution deal with VCX, whereby VCX agreed to pay M & A an advance and make royalty payments on each sale. Upon receiving a print of the film, VCX president Norman Arno contacted M & A president Arthur Weisberg to request copyright protection. Arno also retained the services of attorneys John Lappen and Peter Berger to combat unauthorized copying of the film. Before litigation could commence, VCX was required to add copyright notices to all copies of the film and file registration with the United States Copyright Office; however, VCX could not protect the rights by just adding a notice to the video cassette, since one also needed to be added to the theatrical prints.

In 1981, Berger informed Weisberg of the need to add a copyright notice to the prints that had been sent to various theaters, but Weisberg refused. In 1982, the film entered the public domain, leading to VCX terminating their contract with M & A and ceasing royalty payments. In 1987, M & A brought a case against VCX in the United States District Court for the Eastern District of Michigan for breach of contract. VCX argued that the contract was void due to M & A's failure to comply with the Copyright Act of 1976. They claimed the exclusive distribution deal implied Weisberg had to keep the film's copyright protected, and by not adding the notice, he broke the contract. They also argued that since the film entering the public domain meant anyone could copy and sell it, the exclusive distribution deal was worthless. The court found in favor of VCX, and the judge ruled that "Weisberg's actions had thrust the film irretrievably into the public domain."

=== Obscenity ===
In 1983, a court case in New York, United States v. Various Articles of Obscene Merchandise, found the film not to be obscene.

The 1986 publication of the Meese Report contains graphic descriptions of sex scenes and uncensored dialogue from Debbie Does Dallas as well as from other movies, including the hit movie Deep Throat. The Report gives a clinical account of pictures in magazines like Tri-Sexual Lust, and provides a list of 2,370 film titles and 725 book titles ranging from Horny Holy Roller Family to Thoroughly Amorous Amy. The explicit content made the Meese Report a best seller.

== Legacy ==
Debbie Does Dallas inspired numerous sequels, remakes and spin-offs in the decades since its release. Journalist David Slayden is quoted as saying, "No other pornographic film has been remade more often than Debbie Does Dallas." The sequels include:

- Debbie Does Dallas Part II (1981)
- Debbie Does Dallas III [the Final Chapter] (1985)
- Debbie Does Dallas IV (1988)
- Debbie Does Dallas V (1988)
- Debbie Does Damnation (1990)
- Debbie Does Dallas Again (1993)
- Debbie Does Dallas 20th Anniversary Edition (1994)
- Debbie Does Dallas: The Next Generation (1998)
- Debbie Does Dallas '99 (1998)
- Debbie Does Dallas: The Revenge (2003)
- Debbie Does Dallas: East Vs West (2004)
- Debbie Does Dallas ... Again (2007)

Spin-offs include:

- Debbie Duz Dishes (1986)
- Debbie Does 'Em All (1986)
- Debbie Does Wall Street (1991)
- Debbie Loves Dallas (2007)

=== Stage musical ===
In 2001, Debbie Does Dallas: The Musical was created by Susan L. Schwartz for the New York International Fringe Festival. In 2002, it went off-Broadway. Unlike the original film, the musical did not contain any actual sex or nudity. Since, the show has been performed globally, often with racier direction and more explicit choreography. The story, dialogue and characters are fairly faithful, with musical numbers standing in for sex scenes or added for comic effect. As recent as 2015, it continues to be performed.

=== Television ===
In 2005, a documentary called "Debbie Does Dallas Uncovered" was produced and shown on British television.

=== Remasters and re-releases ===
In 2006, VCX employed Media Blasters to digitally re-master from the original 35-millimeter negative into a limited edition Definitive Collectors’ Edition 2-Disc set on DVD and single-disc Blu-ray Disc. On April 11, 2007, Vivid Entertainment Group began including the original feature alongside a new release, Debbie Does Dallas ... Again in DVD, Blu-ray and HD DVD formats.

== See also ==
- List of films in the public domain in the United States
