= David Ames =

David Ames may refer to:

- David Ames (actor) (born 1983), British actor
- David Ames (American footballer) (1937–2009), American football defensive back and halfback
- David Ames (researcher) (born 1954), Australian psychiatrist and academic
- David Ames (field hockey) (born 1989), Northern Irish field hockey player
- David Ames (colonel) (1760–1847), first superintendent of the Springfield Armory
- David W. Ames (ethnomusicologist) (1922–2012), American ethnomusicologist and anthropologist

== See also ==
- David Aames, character in 2001 American science fiction psychological thriller film Vanilla Sky
- David Amess (1952–2021), British politician and murder victim
