= Debbie Does Dallas: The Musical =

Musical by Andrew Sherman, Tom Kitt, Jonathan Callicutt

- Album cover
- Music: Andrew Sherman; Tom Kitt; Jonathan Callicutt
- Lyrics: Andrew Sherman; Tom Kitt; Jonathan Callicutt
- Book: Susan L. Schwartz
- Basis: Debbie Does Dallas by Maria Minestra
- Productions: 2002 Off-Broadway; 2004 Australia; 2005 Dallas; 2006 San Francisco

Debbie Does Dallas: The Musical is an off-Broadway musical with a book by Susan L. Schwartz, composed by Andrew Sherman, with Tom Kitt and Jonathan Callicutt providing additional music and lyrics. It is based on the 1978 pornographic film Debbie Does Dallas. The musical, like the movie, centers on high schooler Debbie and her friends' attempts to become "Texas" Cowboys cheerleaders; however, the musical contains far less sexual content than the movie. The original Off-Broadway choreography was by Jennifer Cody.

The show had its first run at the New York Fringe Festival. It was originally conceived and produced by Schwartz, who also starred as Debbie. The Araca Group bought the rights to produce the piece and opened it as a musical in 2002 at the Jane Street Theater in New York City. Sherie Rene Scott starred in the musical as Debbie. Since its Off-Broadway run, other productions have taken place, notably in Sydney and Melbourne, Australia (2004) with Ben Steel, and in Dallas, Texas (2005).
