= Bambi Woods =

American pornographic film actress

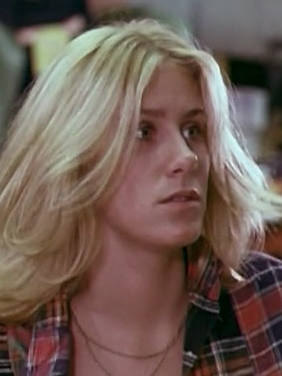
- Woods in Debbie Does Dallas (1978)
- Born: United States
- Disappeared: 1986
- Occupation: Pornographic film actress
- Known for: Debbie Does Dallas

Bambi Woods is an American pornographic film actress and exotic dancer best known for her appearance as the title character in the pornographic film Debbie Does Dallas (1978).

Her success during the Golden Age of Porn and later disappearance from public life led to rumors Woods had died of a drug overdose in 1986, though it was reported in the 2005 documentary "Debbie Does Dallas Uncovered" that the apparent disappearance was a cover story to allow Woods to resume living a private life.

== Pornographic film career ==
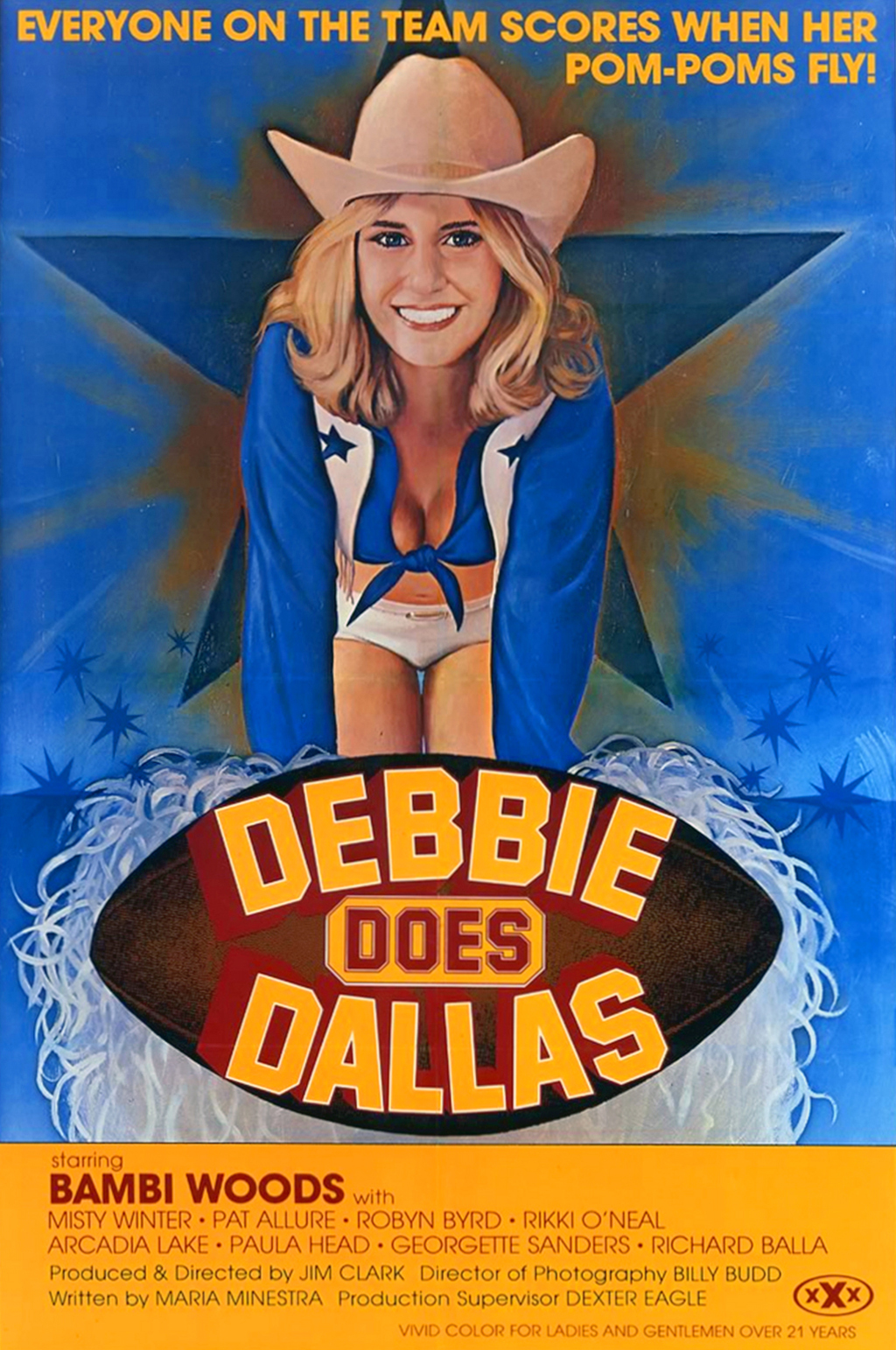
Film poster for Debbie does Dallas

Woods' first adult film role was as "Debbie" in the 1978 pornographic feature film Debbie Does Dallas. A photo of Woods in a uniform modeled after the Dallas Cowboys Cheerleaders was prominently advertised on theater marquees. She was billed as a "former Dallas Cowgirl". Woods had reportedly tried out for the real Dallas Cowboys Cheerleaders, but never made the squad. She also appeared in two sequels, Debbie Does Dallas Part II (1981) and Debbie Does Dallas III: The Final Chapter (1985).

Woods said in an interview for the public-access television program Late Late Blue how she performed in Debbie Does Dallas in an attempt to earn enough money to pay a debt to a friend, but later spent all her earnings, so the same friend arranged for her to perform striptease. Jim Clark, the film's producer and director, described in an interview for the 2005 Channel 4 documentary "Debbie Does Dallas Uncovered" how he created the stage name "Bambi Woods" as an allusion to the Disney character Bambi: "I named her Bambi Woods. There wasn't any real reason behind it. Bambi [...] a deer. In the woods. Do you want to get deeper?"

In the trailer for Debbie Does Dallas, Woods states that the storyline is fictional and not based on her actual experiences, although they could have happened. The partners with whom she had unsimulated sexual intercourse in the film included Robert Kerman and others drawn from the small group of veteran performers who appeared in many hardcore pornographic films made in the U.S. during that era. One reviewer said Woods' demeanor during sex scenes was in keeping with her pseudonym, being reminiscent of a deer in headlights.

Woods' adult-entertainment career occurred towards the end of the golden age of porn, when the filmmakers operated in a legal gray area, making them potentially subject to legal prosecution and also vulnerable to extortion by organized criminals who controlled distribution. At the time, there were no laws requiring mandatory verification and record keeping of participants' true identities and ages, and the real names of even the most prolific actors remained unknown outside their profession until decades later, when the identities of almost all famous performers were circulated on the Internet. Despite the huge profits being made, female performers' fees rarely exceeded the low hundreds of dollars.

The film became a huge success, and Woods mixed with various celebrities in New York City clubs, including Studio 54 and Plato's Retreat. Woods had disappeared completely from the public eye by the mid-1980s.

== Disappearance ==
In 1986, Woods was reported missing. According to Australian newspaper The Age, she died the same year of a drug overdose. However, the 2005 documentary "Debbie Does Dallas Uncovered" suggests Woods' disappearance was a cover story to allow her to resume living a private life. According to Clark, a private investigator learned Woods was living near Des Moines, Iowa, and wished to avoid any further publicity.

== See also ==
- List of solved missing person cases (1980s)
