= Ames Building (disambiguation) =

The Ames Building was Boston, Massachusetts's first skyscraper.

Ames Building may also refer to:

- Ames Building (Dedham, Massachusetts), U.S.
- Ames Research Center, of NASA, at Moffett Field, California, U.S.

== See also ==
- Ames (disambiguation)
