= Hames =

Hames are part of a horse harness.

Hames may also refer to:

== People ==
- Bob Hames (1920–1998), American jazz guitarist
- Chaim (Harvey) Hames (born 1966), professor of history and Rector at Ben-Gurion University of the Negev
- Duncan Hames (born 1977), British Liberal Democrat politician
- Greg Hames (born 1980), English cricketer
- Jagan Hames (born 1975), Australian decathlete
- Jordan Hames, participant in 2019 British TV series Love Island
- Kim Hames (born 1953), Australian politician
- Mat Hames (born 1971), American independent filmmaker
- Michael Hames (1945–2025), British police officer
- Tim Hames, British journalist

== Other uses ==
- Hames Valley AVA, a California wine region

== See also ==
- Haymes, surname
