= Amesbury (disambiguation) =

Amesbury is a town and civil parish in Wiltshire, England.

Amesbury may also refer to:

== Places ==
- Amesbury, Alberta, Canada
- Amesbury, Toronto, Ontario, Canada
- Amesbury, Massachusetts, US
  - Amesbury (CDP), Massachusetts, a US census-designated place

== Schools ==
- Amesbury School, Surrey, England

== People ==
- Alexia Amesbury (born 1951), Seychellois politician and lawyer
- Barbra Amesbury (born 1948, also known as Bill Amesbury), Canadian philanthropist, singer-songwriter, composer, filmmaker
- Charlie Amesbury, (born 1986) British rugby union footballer
- Mike Amesbury (born 1969), British politician
- Charles Dundas, 1st Baron Amesbury (1751–1832), British politician, Baron Amesbury

== Other uses ==
- Amesbury railway station, Amesbury, England
- Amesbury Town F.C., Amesbury, England
- USS Amesbury (DE-66), Buckley-class destroyer escort of the US Navy

== See also ==
- Amesbury Abbey, Amesbury, England
- Amesbury Priory, England
