= Richan =

- Location of Richan in Ontario
- Coordinates: 49°59′37″N 92°49′35″W
- Country: Canada
- Province: Ontario
- Region: Northwestern Ontario
- District: Kenora
- Part: Kenora, Unorganized
- Elevation: 402 m (1,319 ft)
- Time zone: UTC-6 (Central Time Zone)
  - Summer (DST): UTC-5 (Central Time Zone)
- Postal code FSA: P0V
- Area code: 807

Richan is an unincorporated place and community in Unorganized Kenora District in northwestern Ontario, Canada.

It is on the Canadian National Railway transcontinental main line, between Amesdale to the west and Millidge to the east, and is served by Richan railway station, a stop for Via Rail transcontinental Canadian trains.

Richan is also the northern terminus for Ontario Highway 665 that arrives from the south from Ontario Highway 17 near Dryden.
