= John Ames =

John Ames may refer to:

- John Ames (captain) (1738–1805), captain in the Massachusetts Militia, blacksmith
- John Ames (printmaker) (fl. 1777–1792), Bristol based printmaker
- John Judson Ames (1821–1861), California pioneer and newspaper editor
- John Edward Ames (born 1949), American writer of Westerns
- John Ames (politician) (born 1983), Canadian politician in New Brunswick
- John Ames (writer) (born 1944), American writer from Florida, author of Second Serve: The Renée Richards Story
- John W. Ames (politician) (1793–1833), representative to the Great and General Court
- John W. Ames (colonel) (1833–1878), American general and engineer

== See also ==
- Jonathan Ames (born 1964), American author
- Ames (surname)
