= Ronald Amess =

Australian ice hockey player (1927–2011)

- Born: 9 August 1927 Melbourne, Australia
- Died: 20 October 2011 (aged 84) Melbourne, Australia
- Position: Centre
- Played for: Victoria; Wildcats
- National team: Australia
- Playing career: 1959–1962

Ronald William "Ron" Amess (9 August 1927 – 20 October 2011) was an Australian ice hockey player. Amess was a member of the Australian national team during the 1960 Winter Olympics and also competed in the 1962 World Ice Hockey Championships.

== Playing career ==
During the 1950s Amess played for the Wildcats out of the Melbourne Glaciarium. In 1953 he was selected for the Victorian state team to compete at the 1953 Goodall Cup. Victoria went on to win the tournament. In 1960 Amess was selected to play as a forward for the Australian national team to compete at the 1960 Winter Olympics, which is the only ice hockey team Australia has ever sent to the Olympics. Australia finished last in the competition losing all six of their games. Amess who played in five of the six games failed to record any points and finished with only two penalties in minutes. The following year he was recalled to the Victorian state team to compete in the Goodall Cup championship which Victoria again went on to win. In 1962 Amess was selected to the Australian national team to compete at the 1962 World Ice Hockey Championships. Australia who was competing in Group B finished thirteenth overall and won their first ever international game after defeating Denmark 6–2. Amess joined the Victorian state team for the 1962 Goodall Cup which Victoria went on to win for the second year in a row.

Amess was also involved in the formation of the Hakoah-Arkana Ice Hockey Club which is considered the forerunner of the current Melbourne Jets Ice Hockey Club.

== Personal life ==
Amess was born on 9 August 1927. He was the son of Alexander Amess. His sister Betty competed as a speed skater. In 2000 Amess was named a Life Member of the Australian Ice Hockey Federation. He died on 20 October 2011 aged 84.
