= Stanley Amis =

British architect (1924–2021)

Stanley Frederick Amis (12 January 1924 – 10 August 2021), was a British architect.

Amis was born in Virginia Water, Surrey, the son of Frederick Amis, an electrical engineer who worked for Western Electric, and Belinda (nee Nash). He was educated at Merchant Taylors' school in London, followed by the Architectural Association School of Architecture.
