= Joseph Ames =

Joseph Ames may refer to:

- Joseph Ames (author) (1689–1759), English author
- Joseph Ames (naval commander) (1619–1695), English naval commander
- Joseph Alexander Ames (1816–1872), American painter
- Joseph Bushnell Ames (1878–1928), American novelist
- Joseph Sweetman Ames (1864–1943), American physicist
- Ames Brothers member, Joe Ames (1921–2007)
