= Atari Message Information System =

BBS software package

- Original author(s): Tom Giese
- Developer(s): Michigan Atari Computer Enthusiasts
- Initial release: 1983
- Written in: Atari BASIC
- Platform: Atari XL/XE
- Size: 48K
- Type: Bulletin Board System
- License: public domain

The Atari Message Information System (AMIS) was one of the first BBS (Bulletin Board System) software packages available for the Atari 8-bit computers. It was known to crash often and could not be left unattended for more than a few days. The AUTORUN.SYS file which contained the modem handler was at cause. Versions of the AMIS BBS were modified with the modem handler (written by Atari) supplied with the Atari XM301 modem and was deemed much more stable.

The original AMIS BBS software was written in Atari BASIC by Tom Giese member of the MACE (Michigan Atari Computer Enthusiasts). The program included instructions for building a "ring detector" circuit for the board maintainer's modem (Atari 1030 modem) to enable it to answer incoming calls – modems at the time were most often capable of making outgoing calls, but not receiving incoming ones. The one exception being the Atari XM301 modem which had a ring detector built-in.

A sector editor was required for the BBS maintainer to manually allocate message space on their disk, one hex byte at a time.

As of March 2021, there is still an active AMIS BBS, called Amis XE, that one can connect to using telnet (amis86.ddns.net:9000) or a web client provided by the Telnet BBS Guide.

== Alternate versions ==
The software was released into the public domain, and was heavily modified by enthusiasts and BBS maintainers. As such, several versions of AMIS exist, including:

- Standard AMIS – original version by Tom Giese
- MACE AMIS – from the Michigan Atari Computer Enthusiasts, by Larry Burdeno and Jim Steinbrecher
- Fast AMIS
- Carnival BBS
- Comet AMIS – by Matt Pritchard & Tom Johnson of Algonac, Michigan; originally designed for the MPP modem (which used the joystick port, not the regular I/O or 850 Interface ports. At the time this was a very popular low cost modem, that had no software written for it, until John Demar developed a driver to enable software to communicate with the joystick port as if it were the I/O port) and modified to be used with other types of standard modems. The final version featured many automated tasks, usage logs, passwords, private mail, multiple message bases and support for hard drives and MYDOS, and was on the cutting edge of AMIS/Atari 8-bit BBS technology.
- TODAMIS 1.0 – for 1030/XM301 modems, written in 1986 by Trent Dudley
- AMIS XM301 was a heavily modified version of AMIS written by one of the original AMIS programmers, Mike Mitchell (Baudville BBS - Garden City, MI), and newcomer Mike Olin (Molin's Den BBS, Northville, MI), written in Basic XE by Optimized System Software.
- Reed Audio BBS was a modified version of Carnival BBS that added multiple forum support & support for the Atari 1030 modem by way of a hardware ring detector (relay). Created by Todd Gordanier in 1986.
- FujiAMIS Modified version of AMIS to include modem configuration for the FujiNet device, telnet IP-based deployment, SpartaDOS conversion to high speed I/O, and unlimited message base. Created by Robert Sherman in 2020.
- Amis XE Modified version of Fuji AMIS to work with emulators and FujiNet Modem configuration, telnet IP based deployment optimized in Basic XE. Created by Robert Sherman in 2021.
