= Abandoned Mines Information System =

Database of abandoned mines in Ontario, Canada

The Abandoned Mines Information System (AMIS) is a database created by the Ministry of Northern Development and Mines of Ontario, Canada. It includes over 6,200 abandoned and inactive mines throughout Ontario, as well as associated hazards. Basic information about every known abandoned and inactive mine in Ontario is in the database, including name, location and period when it was in operation.

== See also ==
- Template:Cite amis
