= Amesdale, Ontario =

Amesdale
- Location of Amesdale in Ontario
- Coordinates: 50°00′58″N 92°56′00″W
- Country: Canada
- Province: Ontario
- Region: Northwestern Ontario
- District: Kenora
- Elevation: 393 m (1,289 ft)
- Time zone: UTC-6 (Central Time Zone)
  - Summer (DST): UTC-5 (Central Time Zone)
- Postal code FSA: P0V
- Area code: 807

Amesdale is an unincorporated place and community in Unorganized Kenora District in northwestern Ontario, Canada. It is on the Canadian National Railway (CNR) transcontinental main line, between Niddrie to the west and Richan to the east, and is passed but not served by Via Rail transcontinental Canadian trains. It is also at the junction of a former CNR railway branch line through Ear Falls to Bruce Lake, Ontario that serviced the Griffith iron ore mine.
