= Lisa Marie Abato =

American pornographic actress turned anti-pornography activist

Holly Ryder
- Born: Lisa Marie Abato; 1966 or 1967 (age 58–59)
- Occupations: Pornographic film actress; anti-pornography activist

Lisa Marie Abato (born 1966 or 1967), known by the stage name Holly Ryder, is an American anti-pornography activist and former pornographic film actress.

== Career ==
Abato worked in the adult film industry for over two years, performing in 200 films. During the early 1990s period of the AIDS endemic, Abato moved away from traditional pornography and into specialized films, which did not require intercourse, including BDSM films. Abato participated in the Adult Video Boxing Championships in October 1992, fighting Laurie Pike. In December 1992, she retired from the adult film industry.

After retiring, Abato founded the Holly Ryder Foundation, an organization that funds research around runaways. In 1993, the organization donated $250,000 to the University of California, Los Angeles to research runaways in the sex industry. Abato also became an anti-pornography activist, defining the industry as a crime that is linked to drug trafficking and money laundering. She created a political action committee, the Holly Ryder Commission with the goal of ending the pornography industry in California.

She began collecting signatures for a ballot measure banning the sale of pornography in California and changing the definition of pornographic films to forms of prostitution, which she wanted to appear on the ballot for the November 1994 elections. Her efforts have been opposed by pro-free speech advocates. She funded her efforts with an inheritance from her grandmother.

== Personal life ==
As of 1993, Abato was studying to be a stockbroker.
