= Mohamed Aamer =

Egyptian actor (b. 1986)

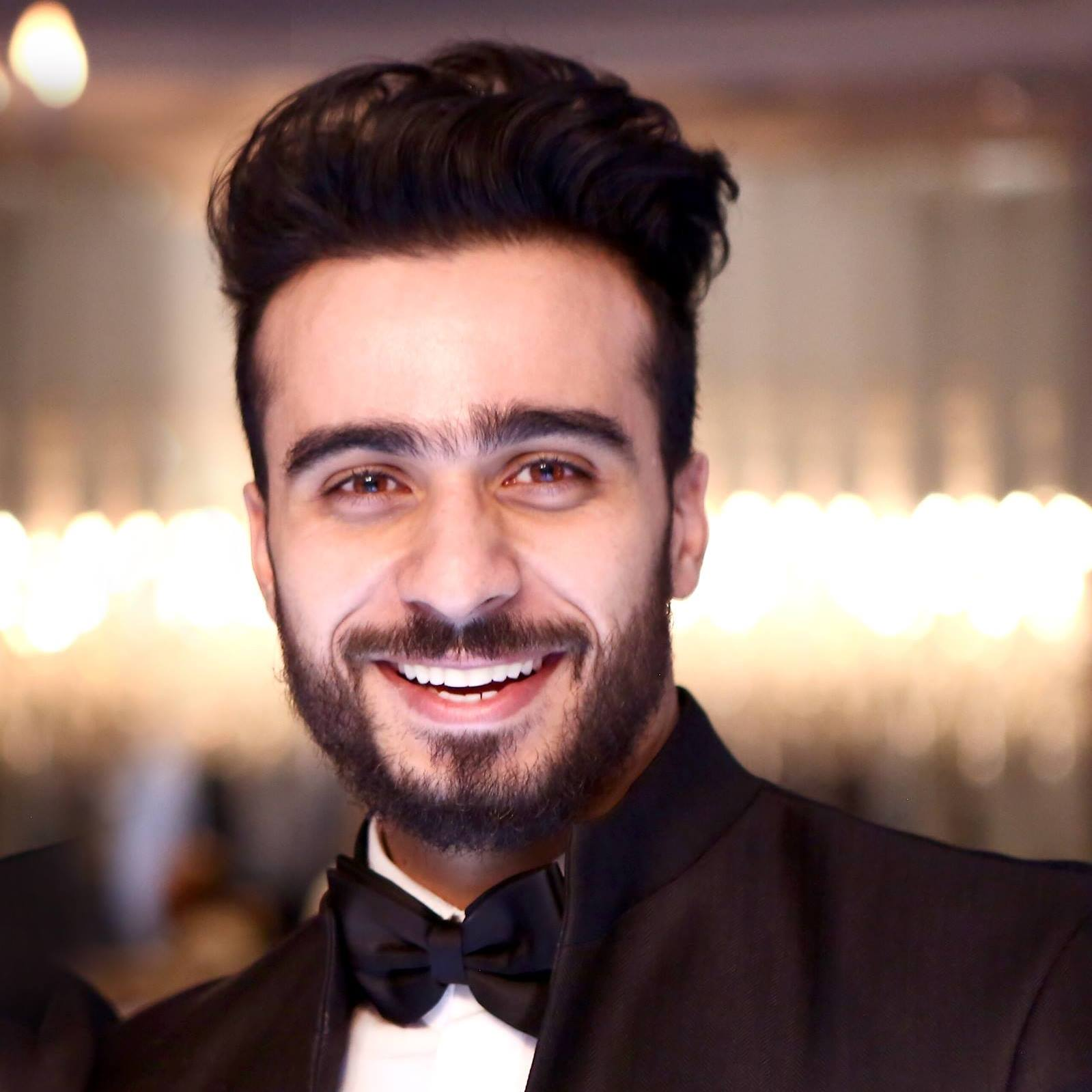
- Born: Mohamed Mohamed Salah Abd-El Aziz; March 17, 1986 (age 40); Cairo, Egypt
- Occupation: Actor
- Height: 5 ft 8 in (1.85 cm)

Mohamed Aamer (Arabic: محمد عامر) (born March 17, 1986) is an Egyptian actor. Early in his acting career he appeared in popular series like Khatem Sulaiman. When he did that role that introduced him to a large audience was with actor Khaled Elsawi, then he starred in the well known series "Bab Al Khalq" as the tough guy, which seemed to be his role in most of his hit roles afterwards, then he presented TV shows and programs like "El Zaffa 2" and others.

== Television ==
- Khatem Soliman – 2011
- Bab Al Khalq – 2012
- Eishq Al Nesaa – 2014
- Azmet Nasab – 2016
- Naseeby wa Qesmtk (PT2) – 2018

== TV programs ==
- El Zaffa II

== Theatre ==
- Al Mosarea' w Hala Al Turk
