= David W. Ames =

American ethnomusicologist and anthropologist (1922–2012)

David Wason Ames (May 30, 1922 – July 31, 2012) was an American ethnomusicologist and anthropologist. He is most notable for his fieldwork in West Africa and for his music recordings of local people, such as the Hausa in Nigeria.

== Early life and education ==
David Wason Ames was born on May 30, 1922, in Crawfordsville, Indiana. He received his first degree from Wabash College in 1947, then his PhD from Northwestern University in 1953.

== Career ==
David Ames briefly taught at the Illinois Institute of Technology in 1950, then moved on to the University of Wisconsin, where he taught from 1952 to 1959. He moved to San Francisco State University (also known as California State University at San Francisco) by 1961. He has been emeritus faculty there since 1993.

During his fieldwork, Ames spent time documenting rural life in West Africa. In Gambia and Senegal, he completed an ethnographic survey of the Wolof people, noting the syncretism of their Islamic and pagan beliefs. Additionally, he studied the polygynous marriage traditions of the Wolof, concluding that there existed an economic basis for the practice.

Early in his career, Ames was a research associate for the Wisconsin Legislative Council's Menominee Indian Study Committee. He co-authored an article with Burton R. Fisher in the Journal of the Wisconsin Indian Research Institute which reflected on the thoughts of termination, organization of Menominee society, and recommended changes to programs.

Collections of his work are held at the Hoover Institution Library and Archives and the University of Wisconsin-Green Bay Archive. A collection of his photographs from his time in Gambia in 1950, where he visited a Wolof village, are held at the Eliot Elisofon Photographic Archives within the National Museum of African Art. His audio recordings are held in collections all over the United States, including at the University of Washington Ethnomusicology Archives and the Archives of Traditional Music at Indiana University. Smithsonian Folkways Recordings, when discussing Ames's recordings from Gambia and Senegal, note the distinctive percussion elements, as well as the blend of regional styles.

== Death ==
Ames died on July 31, 2012, at the age of 90.

== Selected works ==
- Glossary of Hausa Music and Its Social Contexts, with Anthony V. King, 1971
- “Belief in ‘Witches’ among the Rural Wolof of the Gambia.” Africa: Journal of the International African Institute,1959
- "The Economic Base of Wolof Polygyny.” Southwestern Journal of Anthropology, 1955
- Igbo music between 1975 and 1992
