= James Ames =

James Ames may refer to:

- James Barr Ames (1846–1910), American law educator
- James W. Ames (1864–1944), African-American physician
