= Amesbury (CDP), Massachusetts =

Amesbury, Massachusetts
- Former Census-designated place
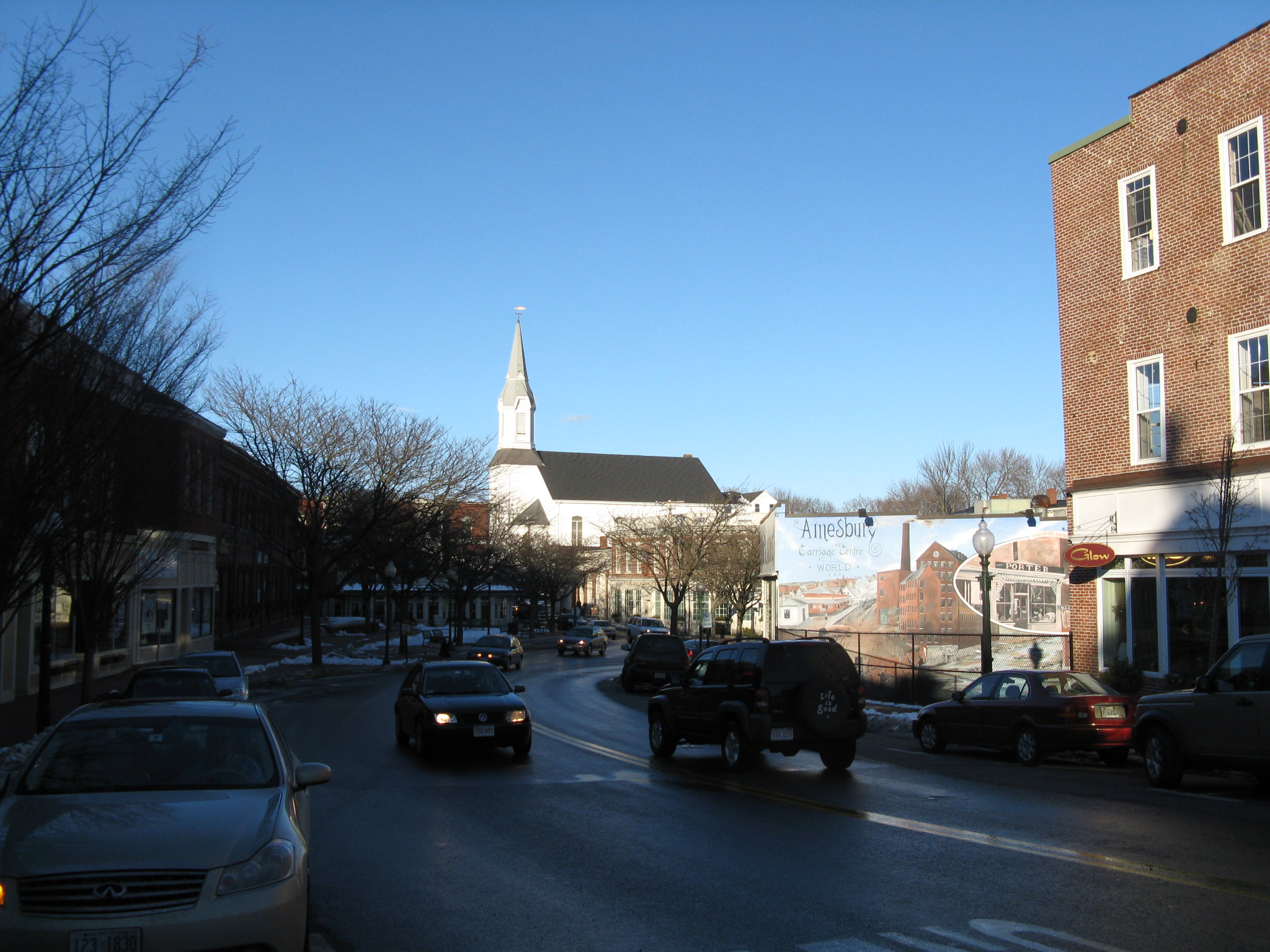
- Main Street
- Interactive map of Amesbury, Massachusetts
- Coordinates: 42°51′22″N 70°55′41″W
- Country: United States
- State: Massachusetts
- County: Essex

Area
  - Total: 5.7 sq mi (14.7 km^{2})
  - Land: 5.3 sq mi (13.8 km^{2})
  - Water: 0.35 sq mi (0.9 km^{2})
- Elevation: 56 ft (17 m)

Population (2000)
  - Total: 12,327
  - Density: 2,321/sq mi (896.3/km^{2})
- Time zone: UTC-5 (Eastern (EST))
  - Summer (DST): UTC-4 (EDT)
- ZIP code: 01913
- Area code: 978
- FIPS code: 25-01220
- GNIS feature ID: 0614180

Amesbury CDP was a census-designated place comprising the main urban portions of the city of Amesbury, Massachusetts, in Essex County. With the change of Amesbury's status from town to city in 1996, the delineation of the downtown area as a CDP became unnecessary, and it was no longer used for data collection by the time of the 2010 census.

Those details reported here are also included in the aggregate values reported for the entire city; at the 2000 census, the CDP had a total population of 12,327.

== Geography ==
According to the United States Census Bureau, the CDP had a total area of 14.7 km^{2} (5.7 sq mi). 13.8 km^{2} (5.3 sq mi) of it was land and 1.0 km^{2} (0.39 sq mi) of it was water. The total area was 6.51% water.

== Demographics ==
As of the census of 2000, there were:

- 12,327 people,
- 4,910 households, and
- 3,093 families residing in the CDP.

The population density was 896.3 people/km^{2} (2,321 people/mi^{2}). There were 5,099 housing units at an average density of 370.8 units per square kilometre (960 units/mi^{2}). The racial makeup of the CDP was 96.87% White, 0.65% African American, 0.21% Native American, 0.60% Asian, 0.02% Pacific Islander, 0.28% from other races, and 1.37% from two or more races. 1.05% of the population were Hispanic or Latino of any race.

There were 4,910 households, out of which 33.2% had children under the age of 18 living with them, 46.6% were married couples living together, 12.4% had a woman whose husband did not live with her, and 37.0% were non-families. 29.7% of all households were made up of individuals, and 9.8% had someone living alone who was 65 years of age or older. The average household size was 2.45, and the average family size was 3.07.

In the CDP the population was spread out, with 25.4% under the age of 18, 6.6% from 18 to 24, 34.5% from 25 to 44, 21.0% from 45 to 64, and 12.5% who were 65 years of age or older. The median age was 36 years. For every 100 females, there were 92.8 males. For every 100 females age 18 and over, there were 88.6 males.

The median income for a household in the CDP was $50,037, and the median income for a family was $59,853. Males had a median income of $41,566 versus $31,209 for females. The per capita income for the CDP was $22,657. 7.0% of the population and 4.6% of families were below the poverty line. Out of the total people living in poverty, 8.7% were under the age of 18 and 10.3% were 65 or older.
