= Solace Ames =

American writer

- Occupation: Author
- Writing career
- Genre: Erotic Fiction
- Notable works: The Submission Gift, The Companion Contract
- Website: solaceames.com

Solace Ames is an American writer specializing in erotic fiction. She has also written under the pen name Violetta Vane.

== Career ==
Ames is a self-taught writer. Her short story Tomorrow's Much Too Long was placed third in Hyphen's first Erotic Writing Contest in 2013.

Ames first published The Dom Project with Carina Press with another author, Heloise Belleau in 2013. The main character was a tall, "tattooed Asian bad-boy Dom."

Ames's first solo book, The Submission Gift, released in 2014, was reviewed by Publishers Weekly, which called it a "nuanced look at polyamory and BDSM." In the story, a husband hires a rent boy as a "gift" to his wife. He does this because he has just recovered from a serious car accident and can no longer provide a full sex life for his wife.

Her second solo publication, The Companion Contract, released in 2015, was also favorably reviewed by Publishers Weekly. This book is about a woman who works as a pornographic actress, but wants to move onto another career and another place in her life.

Ames always makes a point of including safe sex practices in her writing, such as the use of condoms or the regular screening of partners for sexually transmitted infections (STI). When Ames first started writing romance novels, she wanted to create multicultural stories. She says that "characters aren't as real to me if I don't understand where they come from." Ames also stresses how treating multiculturalism in erotica must be rooted in a sense of personhood, rather than "fetishizing" or objectifying a person for their differences.

== Personal life ==
Ames's father was a Japanese citizen, and her mother was raised in the United States: each had different expectations on how to raise their daughter. Ames has characterized them as "anarcho-hippies". Growing up, Ames felt that she was often fetishized by men who viewed Asian women as sex objects. During her early twenties, she worked in a strip club in order to make money, though she doesn't "talk about it much after because of the stigma".

Ames is married and has children.

== Bibliography ==
- Ames, Solace (2015). The Companion Contract. Don Mills, Ontario: Carina Press. ISBN 9781426899522.
- Ames, Solace (2014). The Submission Gift. Don Mills, Ontario: Carina Press. ISBN 9781426898280.
- Belleau, Heloise; Ames, Solace (2013). The Dom Project. Don Mills, Ontario: Carina Press. ISBN 9781426897672.
