= Amis (surname) =

Amis is a surname. Notable people with the surname include:

- B. D. Amis (1896–1993), American labor and civil rights leader
- John Amis (1922–2013), British music critic and broadcaster
- Kenneth Amis (born 1970), composer and tuba player
- Kingsley Amis (1922–1995), British novelist
- Martin Amis (1949–2023), British novelist, son of Kingsley
- Rufus Travis Amis (1912–2007), American entrepreneur
- Stanley Amis (1924–2021), British architect
- Stephen Amis (born 1966), Australian film producer and director, cousin of Martin
- Suzy Amis (born 1962), American actress and model
