= Aamer Majeed =

Pakistani cricketer (born 1969)

Aamer Majeed (born 12 December 1969 in Lahore) is a Pakistani former first-class cricketer active 1986–1992 who played for Lahore City. Aamer Majeed was a right-handed batsman and a right-arm off break bowler.
