= Aamer Sohail (cricketer, born 1972) =

Pakistani cricketer (born 1972)

Personal information
- Born: 10 October 1972 (age 54); Bahawalpur, Pakistan
- Source: Cricinfo, 26 February 2016

Aamer Sohail (born 10 October 1972) is a Pakistani former first-class cricketer who played for Bahawalpur and Pakistan Customs. He played 62 First-class and 40 List A cricket games
