= Amis (Internet service provider) =

Internet service provider (ISP) in Slovenia and Croatia

- Type: Public
- Industry: Internet service provider (ISP)
- Founded: 1995
- Headquarters: Maribor, Slovenia
- Key people: Boštjan Košak
- Products: IPTV, Internet, VOIP
- Website: www.amis.net

Amis is an Internet service provider (ISP) in Slovenia, providing nationwide solutions for more than 105,000 domestic and business users with leading electronic communications and entertainment services. The company is situated in Maribor and Ljubljana. Amis was acquired by the A1 Group in 2015.

== History ==
The company was established on May 15, 1995, as the first specialized internet service provider in Slovenia. In order to expand and provide internet services for the Slovenian market, in 1997 internet network Amis was established in the framework of the company. Amis thus became a Brand, holder of all market services and products still today.

In the early stages, before entering of financial investors, Amis was based predominantly on its own sources, simple organization and focusing on niche market segments. The achieved business success led to admittance of new investors in 2006, namely investment funds Iris Capital (France) and KBC (Belgian) which enabled fast growth, large-scale expansion of activities and trebled number of staff of the company. IRIS and KBC bought Amis on June 28, 2006, for 8,380,000 EUR (together with Amis Telecom in Croatia). Ten years later, on January 4, 2016, Amis was sold (together with Amis Telecom in Croatia) for 33.939,330.24 EUR to mobile provider A1 and on March 16, 2016, integrated into A1.

Today, Amis is the sole provider of telecommunication services with long tradition and continuous growth. The nationwide Slovenian market is being covered by Amis' services.

== Network and services ==
In all years of its existence, Amis relied on its tradition as the first alternative provider of broadband access. The company built the largest alternative ADSL 2+ network in Slovenia and in 2011 started to market broadband services on optical network of the national operator.

AMIS also markets TDMoIP and VoIP services to corporate and residential users. Since 2013 AMIS extended the technical product portfolio with the introduction of VDSL2 mainly for corporate users.

In the segment of domestic users, Amis Televizija represents the key platform for development and marketing of leading IPTV services and other contents and thus becoming the centre of entertainment in households. It is easily accessible via STB, mobile telephone, personal or tablet computer.
