= Aamer Gul =

Pakistani cricketer (born 1974)

Aamer Gul (born 27 December 1974 in Lahore) is a Pakistani former first-class cricketer who played for Bahawalpur, Lahore City and National Bank of Pakistan. Active from 1994 to 1998 Aamer Gul, was a right-handed batsman and right-arm off break bowler.
