= Ames Airport =

Ames Airport may refer to:

- Ames Municipal Airport in Ames, Iowa, US (FAA/IATA: AMW)
- Ames Field in Trenton, Florida, US (FAA: 8J2)
