= Oxford Military College =

Location
- Oxford Ring Road Garsington Road; Cowley, Oxfordshire; England
- Coordinates: 51°43′51″N 1°12′26″W

Information
- Type: Independent school military college Boarding school
- Religious affiliation: Church of England
- Established: 1876
- Closed: 1896
- Gender: Boys
- Age: 13 to 18

Oxford Military College was an all-male private boarding school and military academy in Cowley, Oxford, England, from 1876 to 1896. The military college opened on 7 September 1876. Prince George, Duke of Cambridge was the patron of the Oxford Military College. The military college was declared bankrupt in 1896. The college's 88 acres (36 ha) site later housed Morris Motors (1912–25) and the Nuffield Press (1925-1992). The main college building (manor house) was demolished in 1957. The buildings were used by the Nuffield Press until the mid 1990s after which they were converted into residential flats.

== Mission ==
The College provided a four-year college preparatory curriculum: First year (age 13–14); Second year (age 14–15); Third year (age 15–16); Fourth year (age 16–17); Final year (age 17–18). The school drew its cadets from the United Kingdom and the Colonies. Candidates, whether sons of officers or not, were prepared for commissions in the military service, for any profession or business. The senior pupils were enabled to enter the University as unattached students, and to proceed to degrees. It combined classical studies with a military curriculum. The College provided instruction in military riding, infantry drill, lance, sword, carbine drill, swimming and gymnastics.

== Personnel ==
The staff initially consisted of a Head Master, Second Master & Senior Classical Master, 13 Assistant Masters, 2 examiners (classics), a physician & visiting surgeon, organist, an inspector & instructor of gymnastics, and a riding master.

Some of the courses at the college were instructed by current or former officers. Brigade Sergeant-Major Royal Horse Artillery William H. Garlick, for example, was Riding Master at Oxford Military College c. 1883. In 1894, the staff listed in Whitaker's Almanack consisted of a head master G.B. Grundy, 8 Assistant Masters, and a Secretary to Directors. William John Locke, the novelist, was a master at the Oxford Military College at Temple Cowley in 1889 and 1890.

== Campus ==
The buildings, which had been used previously by the Cowley Middle Class School, were purchased for the College in July 1876. A 16th-century manor house stood on Oxford Road near the corner with Hollow Way. The campus consisted of school buildings, playing fields, and a central parade square. The college was extended with the addition of an east wing designed by Sir Thomas Graham Jackson. Albert Parker, 3rd Earl of Morley laid the foundation stone on 21 July 1877.

- College hall, 16th-century former manor house; demolished in 1957
- Chapel, 1870, Decorated style, from designs by Mr. Edward George Bruton.
- library
- gymnasium
- central parade square.

== Council ==
The Oxford Military College Council consisted of: Lord Wolseley, Lord Wantage, Lord Napier (of Magdala), the Marquis of Hertford, the Marquis of Lorne, General Sir Dighton Probyn, General William McMurdo, Colonel Duncan, Sir Charles Tupper and Sir Saul Samuel, Sir Walter Buller, Sir James Francis Garrick, and Sir Arthur Blyth.

== Regulations ==
Candidates for military commissions were to enter not later than the age of 13 in the UK, or 14 in the colonies. The 13-week training duration consisted of three terms and vacations over a three- to four-year duration.

== Tuition and fees ==
The fee ranged from 90 to 100 guineas a year.

== Colonial scholarships ==
During an address in 1886 to the students of the Oxford Military College, Lord Wolseley expressed regret that there were no students from the Colonies since youth from the Colonies would weld together the empire. Six colonial scholarships were offered subsequently annually, two scholarships in each of the principal colonies. The scholarships of £50 and £25 were awarded for three years depending on residency and satisfactory conduct. To qualify for entry via scholarship, the headmaster of the College set a paper, which was decided by the examiners for general proficiency or excellence in one or more subjects. The scholarships were awarded to boys of good character of 14–16 years of age, whose parents or guardians lived in the Colonies. Owners who held over 20 shares of the college could nominate a student at a lower rate than others.

== Prizes ==
Annual prizes were awarded for French, dictation, mathematics, religious instruction (given by Bishop of Oxford John Fielder Mackarness); history (given by Sir Edmund Lechmere, 3rd Baronet M.P.), German (given by Colonel Moncrieff).

== List of Commandants ==
- Lieut.-Colonel Arthur Sutherland Macartney, R.A., retired, Commandant (1880–93).
- G.B. Grundy, Head Master 1894-96

== Notable former pupils ==
Alumni includes military, civic and business leaders.

- His Excellency Sir William Lamond Allardyce Knight Commander of St. Michael and St. George, Knight of Grace of the Order of St. John of Jerusalem, Governor and Commander in Chief of Newfoundland and Labrador
- Sir Eric Campbell Geddes GCB, GBE, PC (1875–1937), businessman and politician, was educated at Oxford Military College, where he played rugby.
- Sir Francis Fletcher-Vane, 5th Baronet
- Lieutenant-Colonel Robert Leycester Haymes DSO

== Bibliography ==
- Roger T. Stearn, Oxford Military College (1876–1896). In Soldiers of the Queen, issue 83, December 1995, Victorian Military Society.
- John Teckleborough, Seven years of Cadet life, containing the records of the Oxford Military College (1885).
- László Gróf, The Oxford Military College MS. Paper presented at Local History Seminar, Rewley House, Oxford University, 1993
