= Ames (automobile) =

Defunct American motor vehicle manufacturer

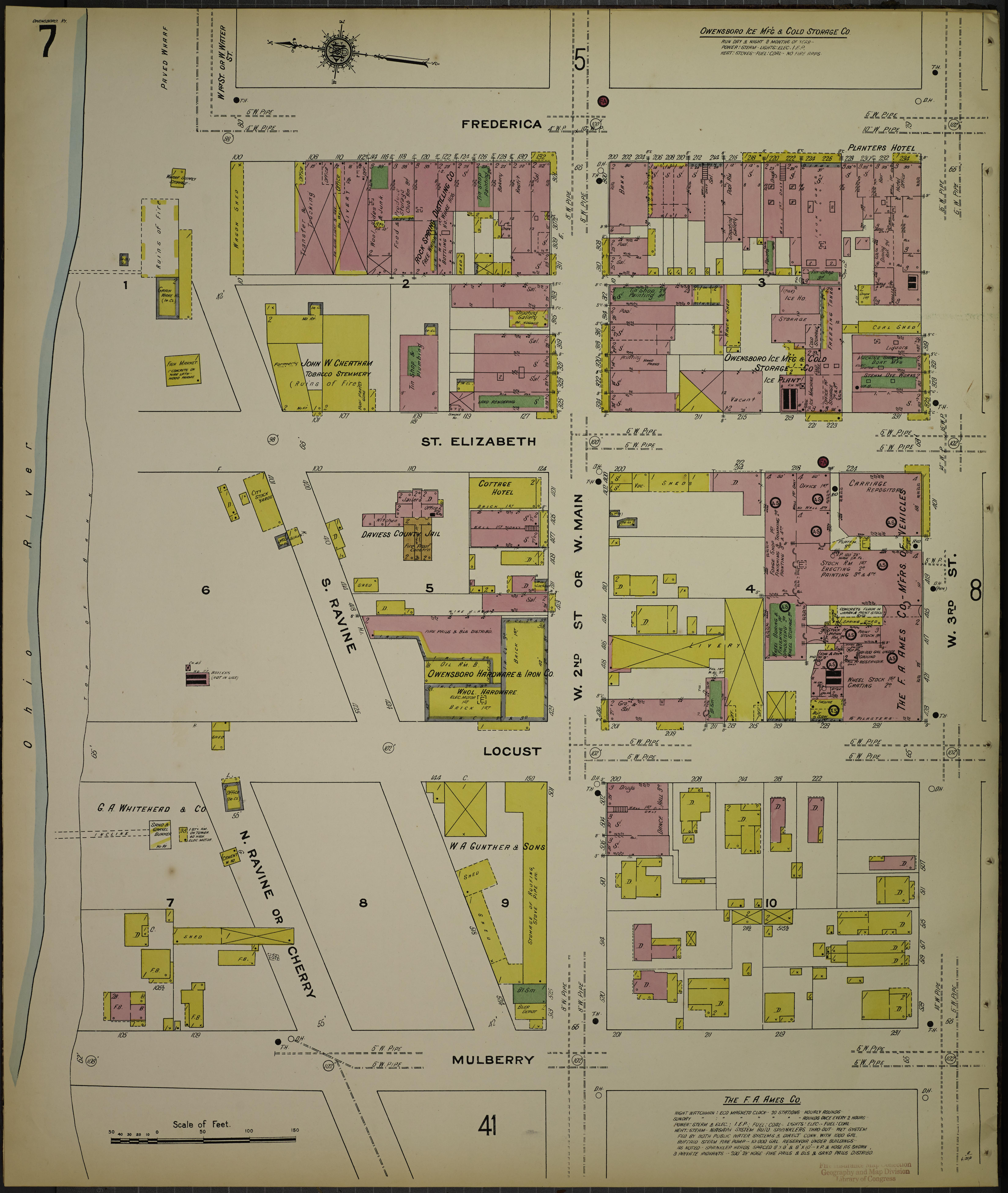
Ames Plant (1910)

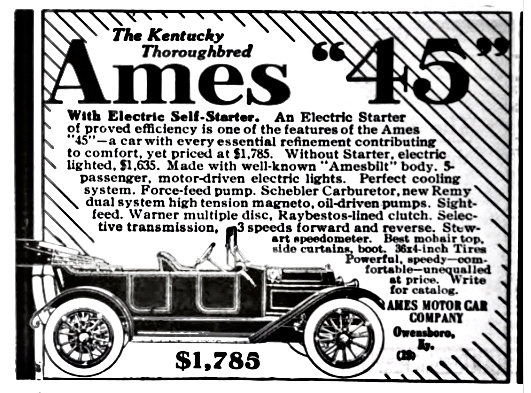
Ames Model 45 (1913–1915)

The Ames (/eɪmz/) company, originally established in 1881 by Frederick A. Ames, was a buggy manufacturer and later an American automobile manufacturer in Owensboro, Kentucky, from 1910 to 1925. A beetle-backed "gentleman's roadster" and a five-passenger tourer were the first models offered for sale by the company. The company also produced replacement bodies for the Ford Model T. At its peak, the company produced about 30,000 vehicles. The last model the company made was called the "Kentucky Thoroughbred". In 1922, the company again remade itself, manufacturing furniture under the name F. A. Ames Corporation until 1941, when the company filed for bankruptcy and most of its assets were purchased by the Whitehall Furniture Co. of Owensboro.

Frederick A. Ames died in 1925 at the age of 60. At the time of his death, he was reported to have vast real-estate holdings in Owensboro and Atlanta, Georgia. His widow, the former Mary M. McMannon, died in 1933. Although the Ames had no children of their own, Mary's niece, Marie had been raised in their home as an adopted child, and inherited most of Ames' fortune.

== Production models ==
- Ames Model 30 (1911–1912)
- Ames Model 40 (1912)
- Ames Model 42 (1912)
- Ames Model 52 (1912–1913)
- Ames Model 44 (1913–1914)
- Ames Model 45 (1913–1915)

== Gallery ==
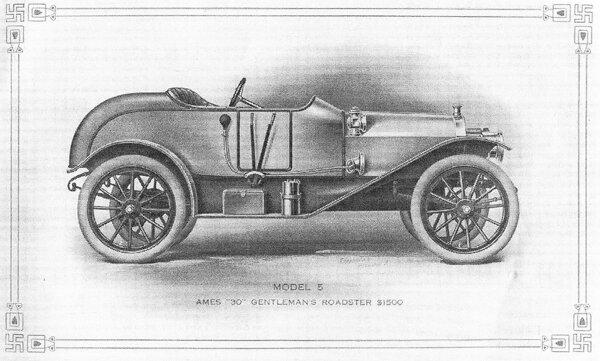
1910 Ames 30 Gentleman's Roadster

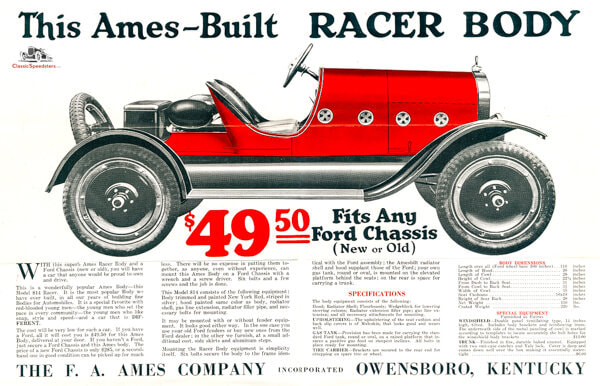
1922 Ford-based Ames 814

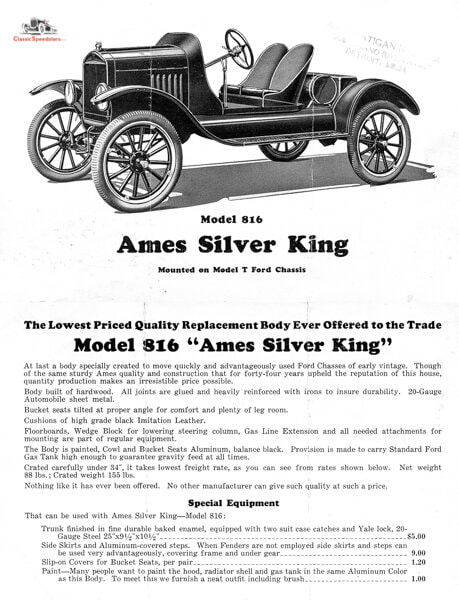
1924 Ford Model T-based Ames 816 Speedster
