= Mercedes Brea López =

Spanish linguist

- Born: 31 May 1950 (age 76)
- Occupation: Linguist

Academic background
- Education: University of Santiago de Compostela

Academic work
- Institutions: University of Santiago de Compostela

María de las Mercedes Brea López, born in Estrada on 31 May 1950, is a Galician philologist in the department of Romance Philology at the University of Santiago de Compostela.

== Career ==
In 1972 she graduated with a degree in Philosophy and Letters (department of Romance Philology) from the University of Santiago de Compostela, receiving two awards: the 'Premio extraordinario fin de carreira' and the 'Premio nacional fin de carreira'. In 1973 she started to teach classes at the USC. Later, in 1975, she received her doctorate in Romance Philology. In 1983 she started to work at the University of Granada, becoming a professor there in 1984. She returned to the USC in 1986. In 2000 she was elected dean of the Faculty of Philology at the University of Santiago de Compostela. She was also director of the University Press and Vice Chancellor of Staff at the USC.

She also directs the doctoral programme in Arts and Humanities, Social and Legal Sciences, and coordinates the research group GI-1350 at the USC, as well as the Network of interdisciplinary medieval studies which is funded by the Xunta de Galicia.

She has published work in journals like Verba, Grial, Revista Galega do Ensino and Revistas de Lenguas y Literaturas Catalana, Gallega y Vasca. She is Principal Investigator on the project 'O cancioneiro de xograres galegos'.

In 2016, the faculty of philology celebrated her career with the publication of a festschrift: Cantares de amigos. Estudos en homenaxe a Mercedes Brea (Songs of Friends. Studies in tribute to Mercedes Brea)

== Works ==
- Lírica profana galego-portuguesa. Corpus completo das cantigas medievais, con estudio biográfico, análise retórica e bibliografía específica (1996).
- Martín Codax, Mendiño e Johan de Cangas (1998)
- A cantiga de amigo (1998, co-authored with Pilar Lorenzo)
- Cantigas do Mar de Vigo. Edición crítica das cantigas de Meendinho, Johan de Cangas e Martín Códax (1998; editor)
- "As cantigas da Ría de Vigo", in Cantigas do Mar. Homenaxe a Johan de Cangas, Mendinho e Martín Códax (1998)
- "E verra i, mia madre, o meu amigo", in Día das Letras Galegas 1998. Martín Códax, Mendiño e Johán de Cangas (1998)
- "Os santuarios á beira do mar", in Johán de Cangas, Martín Códax, Meendinho. 1200–1350, lírica medieval (1998)
- "As cantigas de Santa María", in Proxecto Galicia (2000)
- "D. Xosé Filgueira Valverde e as Cantigas de Santa María", in Memorial Filgueira Valverde. Estudios sobre lírica medieval galego-portuguesa (2002).
- "D. Xosé Filgueira Valverde e a lírica galego-portuguesa" in Xosé Filgueira Valverde. 1906–1996. Un século de Galicia, Museo de Pontevedra (2007), ISBN 978-84-95632-34-0:
