= Audio Messaging Interchange Specification =

Abbreviated and regularly referred to as AMIS, the Audio Messaging Interchange Specification is a standard that allows the transmittal of intact voice mail messages between voice mail systems of different vendors - allowing a user to "forward" a voice mail message to a user on a different voice mail system (in a different geographic area, or conceivably, at a different company).

Developed in 1992, AMIS saw its heaviest use prior to the wide scale adoption of e-mail, as it was the fastest way to get urgent or time sensitive messages to large numbers of people (e.g. A sales team with a "broadcast" message).

== Technical background ==
AMIS is completely "in-band" and analog, meaning that the control commands to indicate who the message is from, the time received and "from" mailbox or caller ID information is all sent as a series of DTMF (Touch tone) digits - along with the message itself, which is transmitted (played and re-recorded by the target system) in real time.

Routing of messages is typically achieved through dedicated AMIS trunks which are just unpublished phone numbers or back doors into a voice mail system, set up to receive AMIS messages.

A voice mail system, on receiving a message addressed to mailbox it did not handle, would initiate an AMIS call to the target voice mail system and relay the message information along with the message itself. The target user could also reply to the message and the process would repeat in reverse.

== Current Use ==
AMIS is still used in larger corporate environments to transfer voice mail messages between geographically separate offices, however, e-mail and unified messaging (which allows forwarding of voice mail messages via email) is rapidly supplanting this purpose.

It is supported by most major voice mail systems manufacturers (IBM, Nortel, Lucent, Toshiba, Siemens, and Cisco among many others).

The AMIS standard was first published in 1992 by the Industry Information Association.
