= Eames (disambiguation) =

Eames is a surname. It may also refer to:

- Eames, Indiana, United States, an unincorporated community
- Eames: The Architect and the Painter, a 2011 documentary
- Eames (Charmed), a character in the television series Charmed
- Eames, a character in the film Inception

== See also ==
- Eames House, a National Historic Landmark in Los Angeles
- Eames & Young, a defunct American architecture firm
