= Lydia May Ames =

American painter (1863–1946)

- Born: 1863; Cleveland, Ohio
- Died: October 1, 1946 (aged 82–83); Cleveland, Ohio
- Education: Cleveland School of Art; Rhode Island School of Design
- Known for: Painter
- Movement: Impressionism

Lydia May Ames (1863 – October 1, 1946) was an American painter from Cleveland, Ohio. She specialized in miniature oil paintings, and was among Cleveland's first female artists in addition to being its first impressionist painter.

== Biography ==
Ames was born in Cleveland in 1863, in what was then Newburgh, to a livery service provider by the name of Ashley Ames. She had one sister, who became a librarian in Cleveland. Her painting career began around 1885. In 1900, she graduated from the Cleveland School of Art with pictorial art as her major. Following her graduation, she continued to teach there for 27 years. She continued to study art at the Rhode Island School of Design. Following retirement from teaching, she opened her own art studio and continued to give lessons. Her last work occurred approximately in 1940. Never married, she died in Cleveland on October 1, 1946.

== Style ==
Noted as one of the earliest female artists from Cleveland, Ames' gained national recognition in the United States for her impressionistic oil paintings of landscapes. These landscapes were typically done as miniatures, the product smaller than a postcard in size. In addition to her oil miniatures she also painted murals. Most of her productive time was spent in Cleveland, although she took trips for sketching purposes to both New England and the Mediterranean.

Ames is sometimes recognized as "Cleveland's first impressionist painter". Her favorite subject was Garfield Park in Cleveland, which was near her home on Miles Avenue.

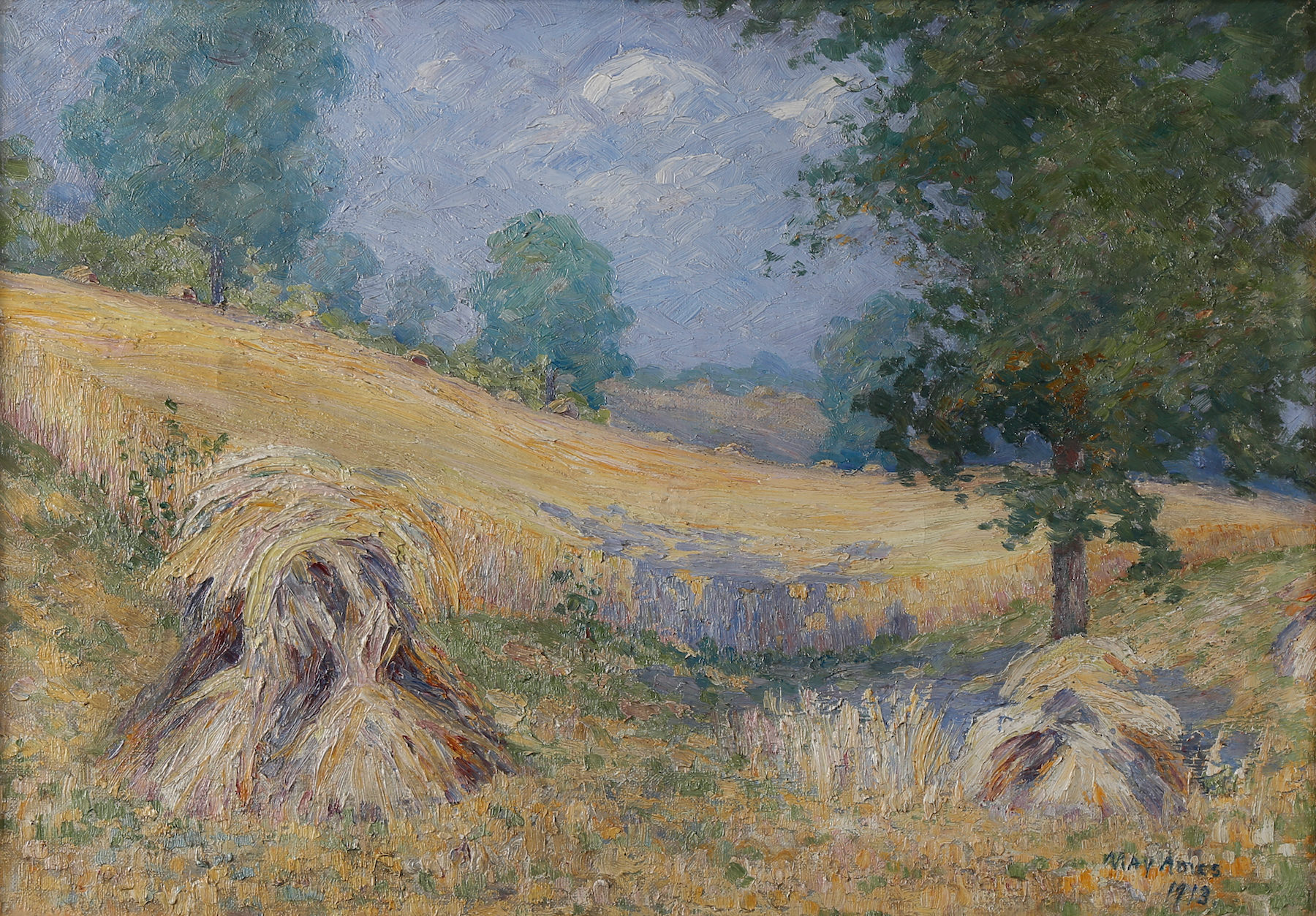
"An Oat Field" by Lydia May Ames (1913)

At one point in Ames career, she was the only woman member of the New York Art Club.

Her teaching focused on anatomy and art history and development, the latter in which she became a noted expert.

== Major exhibitions ==
- Louis M. Sealand Gallery, Cleveland, 1900
- Society of Independent Artists, New York, 1917
- Society of Independent Artists, New York, 1921
- Lindner Store, Cleveland, August 1925
