= Aamer Yousuf =

Pakistani cricketer (born 1985)

Aamer Yousuf (born 1 January 1985 in Gujranwala) is a Pakistani former first-class cricketer active 2008–2010 who played for Pakistan Customs and also represented his country at under-19 level. Aamer Yousuf was a right-handed batsman and a right-arm fast medium pace bowler. He took 19 wickets in his nine first-class appearances with a best innings performance of five for 68.
