= Bestiality =

Sexual acts between humans and animals

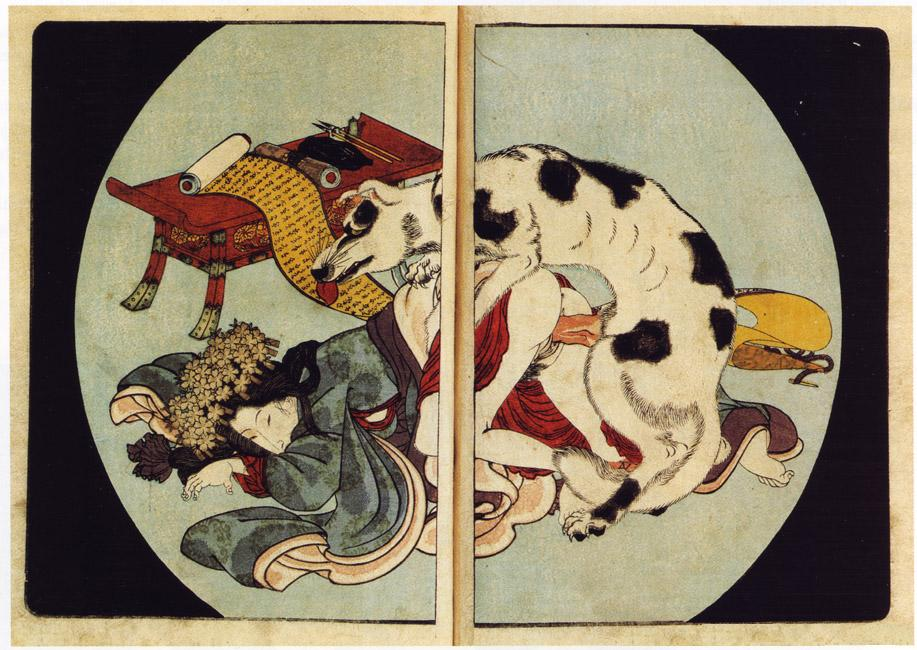
Japanese ukiyo-e woodblock print from Utagawa Kunisada's series, "Eight Canine Heroes of the House of Satomi", 1837

Bestiality (en) refers to cross-species sexual activity between humans and non-human animals. While the two terms are often used interchangeably, it differs from zoophilia, which describes sexual attraction towards animals but not the act. Due to the lack of research on the subject, it is difficult to conclude how prevalent bestiality is.

== Terminology ==
While the two words are often used interchangeably, a distinction is generally made between zoophilia (as a persistent sexual interest in animals) and bestiality (as sexual acts with animals).

This is because bestiality is often not driven by a sexual preference for animals. Some studies have found a preference for animals is rare among people who engage in sexual contact with animals. Furthermore, some zoophiles report they have never had sexual contact with an animal. People with zoophilia are known as "zoophiles", though also sometimes as "zoosexuals", or even very simply "zoos".

Stephanie LaFarge, an assistant professor of psychiatry at the New Jersey Medical School, and Director of Counseling at the ASPCA, writes that two groups can be distinguished: bestialists, who rape or abuse animals, and zoophiles, who form an emotional and sexual attachment to animals. Colin J. Williams and Martin Weinberg studied self-defined zoophiles via the internet and reported them as understanding the term zoophilia to involve concern for the animal's welfare, pleasure, and consent, as distinct from the self-labelled zoophiles' concept of "bestialists", whom the zoophiles in their study defined as focused on their own gratification. Williams & Weinberg (2003) also quoted a British newspaper saying that zoophilia is a term used by "apologists" for bestiality.

== Occurrence ==
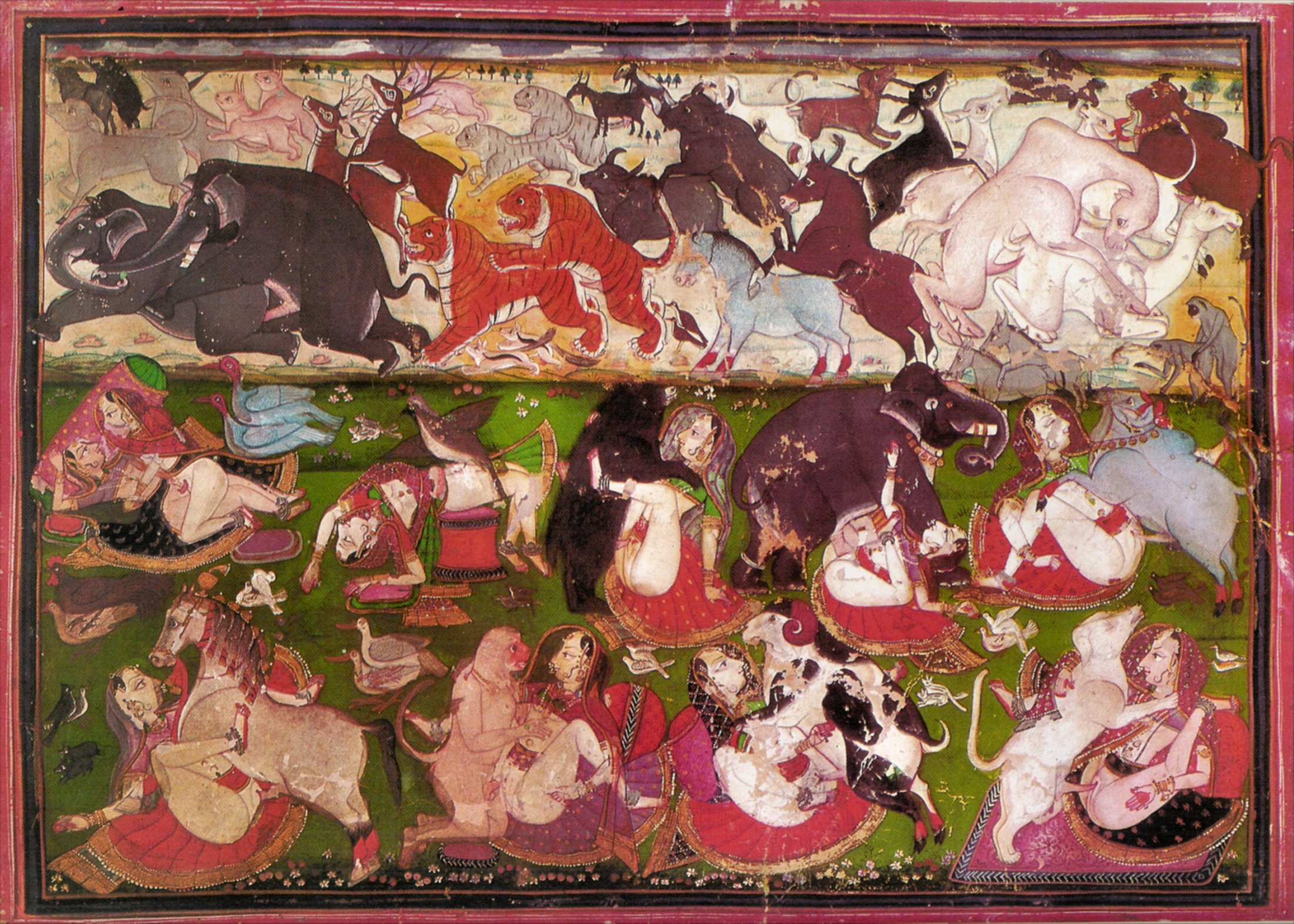
An 18th-century Indian miniature depicting women practicing zoophilia in the bottom register

The Kinsey reports of 1948 and 1953 estimated the percentage of people in the general population of the United States who had had at least one sexual interaction with animals as 8% for males and 5.1% for females (1.5% for pre-adolescent and 3.6% for post-adolescent females), and claimed it was 40–50% for the rural population and even higher among individuals with lower educational status. Some later writers dispute the figures, noting that the study lacked a random sample in that it included a disproportionate number of prisoners, causing sampling bias.

By 1974, the farm population in the US had declined by 80 percent compared with 1940, reducing the opportunity to live with animals; Hunt's 1974 study suggests that these demographic changes led to a significant change in reported occurrences of bestiality. The percentage of males who reported sexual interactions with animals in 1974 was 4.9% (1948: 8.3%), and in females in 1974 was 1.9% (1953: 3.6%). Miletski believes this is not due to a reduction in interest but merely a reduction in opportunity.

Nancy Friday's 1973 book on female sexuality, My Secret Garden, comprised around 190 fantasies from different women; of these, 23 involve zoophilic activity.

A 1982 study suggested that 7.5 percent of 186 university students had interacted sexually with an animal. A 2021 review estimated zoophilic behavior occurs in 2% of the general population.

== Historical perspectives ==
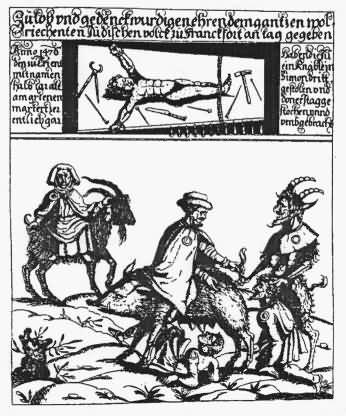
The taboo of zoophilia has led to stigmatized groups being accused of it, as with blood libel. This German illustration shows Jews performing bestiality on a Judensau, while Satan watches.

Instances of zoophilia and bestiality have been found in the Bible, but the earliest depictions of bestiality have been found in a cave painting from at least 8000 BC; in the Northern Italian Val Camonica a man is shown about to penetrate an animal. Raymond Christinger interprets the cave painting as a show of power of a tribal chief. It is unknown if this practice was then more accepted, if the scene depicted was usual or unusual, or if it was symbolic or imaginary. According to the Cambridge Illustrated History of Prehistoric Art, the penetrating man seems to be waving cheerfully with his hand at the same time. Potters of the time period seem to have spent time depicting the practice, but this may be because they found the idea amusing. The anthropologist Dr "Jacobus X", (Note: Professor Marc Epprecht states that authors such as "Jacobus X" do not deserve respect because their methodology is based on hearsay, and was designed for voyeuristic titillation of the reader.) said that the cave paintings occurred "before any known taboos against sex with animals existed". William H. Masters claimed that "since pre-historic man is prehistoric it goes without saying that we know little of his sexual behavior".

Pindar, Herodotus, and Plutarch claimed the Egyptians engaged in ritual congress with goats.

Several cultures built temples (Khajuraho, India) or other structures (Sagaholm, Sweden) with zoophilic carvings on the exterior.

In the Church-oriented culture of the Middle Ages, zoophilic activity was met with execution, typically burning, and death to the animals involved either the same way or by hanging, as "both a violation of Biblical edicts and a degradation of man as a spiritual being rather than one that is purely animal and carnal". Some witches were accused of having congress with the devil in the form of an animal. As with all accusations and confessions extracted under torture in the witch trials in early modern Europe, their validity cannot be ascertained.

== Religious perspectives ==
Passages in Leviticus 18 (Lev 18:23: "And you shall not lie with any beast and defile yourself with it, neither shall any woman give herself to a beast to lie with it: it is a perversion." RSV) and 20:15–16 ("If a man lies with a beast, he shall be put to death; and you shall kill the beast. If a woman approaches any beast and lies with it, you shall kill the woman and the beast; they shall be put to death, their blood is upon them." RSV) are cited by Jewish, Christian, and Muslim theologians as categorical denunciation of bestiality. The teachings of the New Testament have been interpreted by some as not expressly forbidding bestiality.

In Part II of his Summa Theologica, medieval philosopher Thomas Aquinas ranked various "unnatural vices" (sex acts resulting in "venereal pleasure" rather than procreation) by degrees of sinfulness, concluding that "the most grievous is the sin of bestiality". Some Christian theologians extend Matthew's view that even having thoughts of adultery is sinful to imply that thoughts of committing bestial acts are likewise sinful.

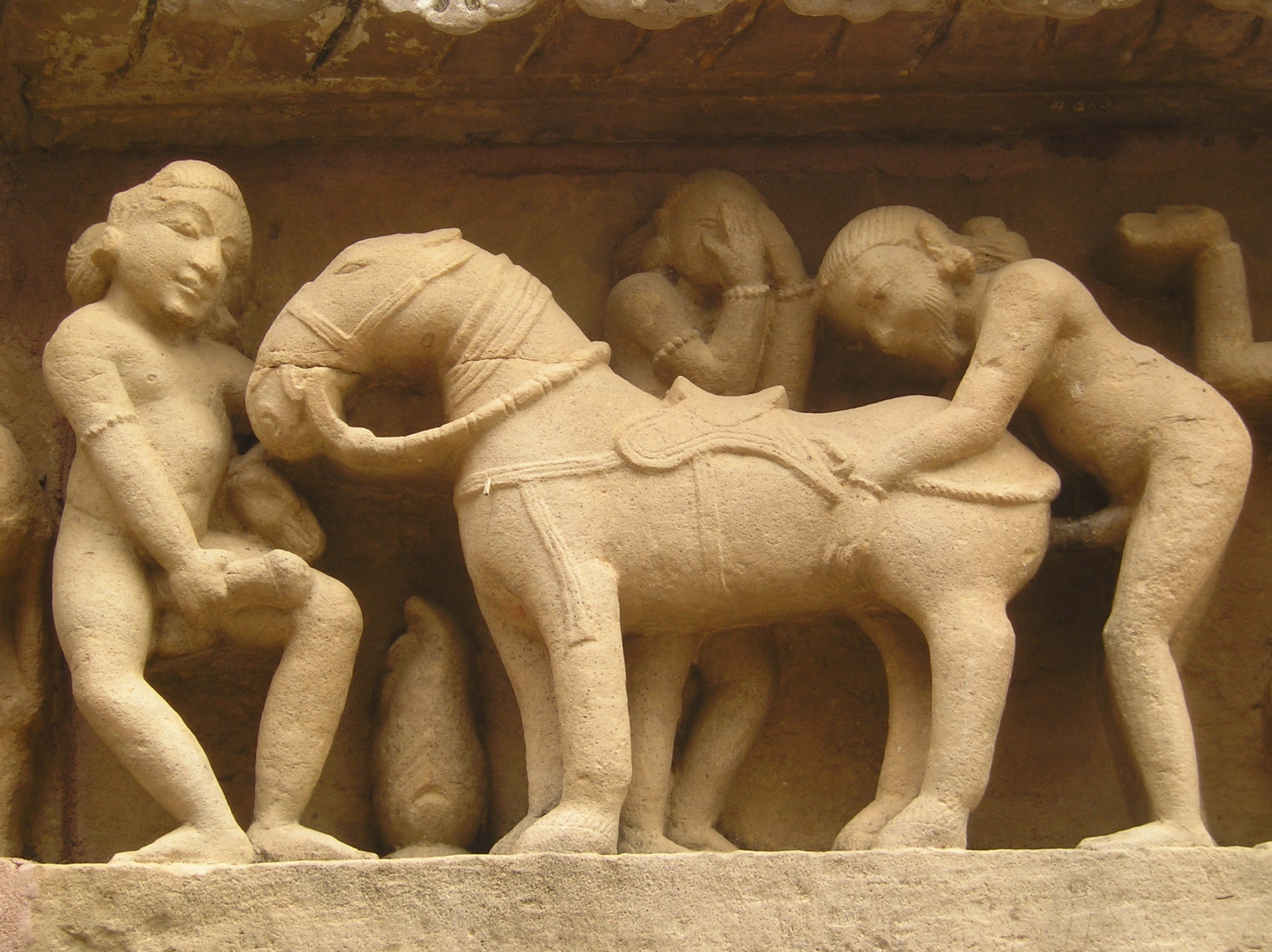
Man having intercourse with a horse, pictured on the exterior of a temple in Khajuraho

There are a few references in Hindu temples to figures engaging in symbolic sexual activity with animals such as explicit depictions of people having sex with animals included amongst the thousands of sculptures of "Life events" on the exterior of the temple complex at Khajuraho. The depictions are largely symbolic depictions of the sexualization of some animals and are not meant to be taken literally. In some Hindu scriptures, such as the Bhagavata Purana and the Devi Bhagavata Purana, having sex with animals, especially the cow, leads one to hell, where one is tormented by having one's body rubbed on trees with razor-sharp thorns. Similarly, the Manusmriti in verse 11.173 also condemns the act of bestiality and prescribes punishments for it:

A man who has had sexual intercourse with nonhuman females, or with a menstruating woman,—and he who has discharged his semen in a place other than the female organ, or in water,—should perform the ‘Sāntapana Kṛcchra. (Sāntapana Kṛcchra is a six-day expiatory fast where one consumes cow’s urine, dung, milk, curd, and ghee on successive days, followed by complete fasting (nirāhāra) on the sixth day to purify body and mind. Manusmṛti 11.213–215)

== Legal status ==
In many jurisdictions, all acts of bestiality are prohibited; others outlaw only the mistreatment of animals, without specific mention of sexual activity. In the United Kingdom, Section 63 of the Criminal Justice and Immigration Act 2008 (also known as the Extreme Pornography Act) outlaws images of a person performing or appearing to perform an act of intercourse or oral sex with another animal (whether dead or alive). Despite the UK Ministry of Justice's explanatory note on extreme images saying "It is not a question of the intentions of those who produced the image. Nor is it a question of the sexual arousal of the defendant", "it could be argued that a person might possess such an image for the purposes of satire, political commentary or simple grossness", according to The Independent.

Many laws, or updates to existing laws banning sex acts with non-human animals have been introduced since 2010. Examples include the United States (New Hampshire and Ohio), Germany, Sweden, Italy, Iceland, Denmark, Thailand, Costa Rica, Bolivia, and Guatemala.

West Germany legalized bestiality in 1969 but reunited Germany banned it again in 2013. The 2013 law was unsuccessfully challenged before the Federal Constitutional Court in 2015.

Romania outlawed bestiality in May 2022.

Laws on bestiality are sometimes triggered by specific incidents. While some laws are very specific, others employ vague terms such as "sodomy" or "bestiality", which lack legal precision and leave it unclear exactly which acts are covered. In the past, some bestiality laws may have been made in the belief that sex with another animal could result in monstrous offspring, as well as offending the community. Modern anti-cruelty laws focus more specifically on animal welfare while anti-bestiality laws are aimed only at offenses to community "standards".

In Sweden, a 2005 report by the Swedish Animal Welfare Agency for the government expressed concern over the increase in reports of horse-ripping incidents. The agency believed animal cruelty legislation was not sufficient to protect animals from abuse and needed updating, but concluded that on balance it was not appropriate to call for a ban. In New Zealand, the 1989 Crimes Bill considered abolishing bestiality as a criminal offense, and instead viewing it as a mental health issue, but they did not, and people can still be prosecuted for it. Under Section 143 of the Crimes Act 1961, individuals can serve a sentence of seven years duration for animal sexual abuse and the offence is considered "complete" in the event of "penetration".

As of 2023, bestiality is illegal in 49 U.S. states. Most state bestiality laws were enacted between 1999 and 2023. Bestiality remains legal in West Virginia, while 19 states have statutes that date to the 19th century or even the colonial period. The recent statutes are distinct from older sodomy statutes in that they define the proscribed acts with precision.

=== Pornography ===
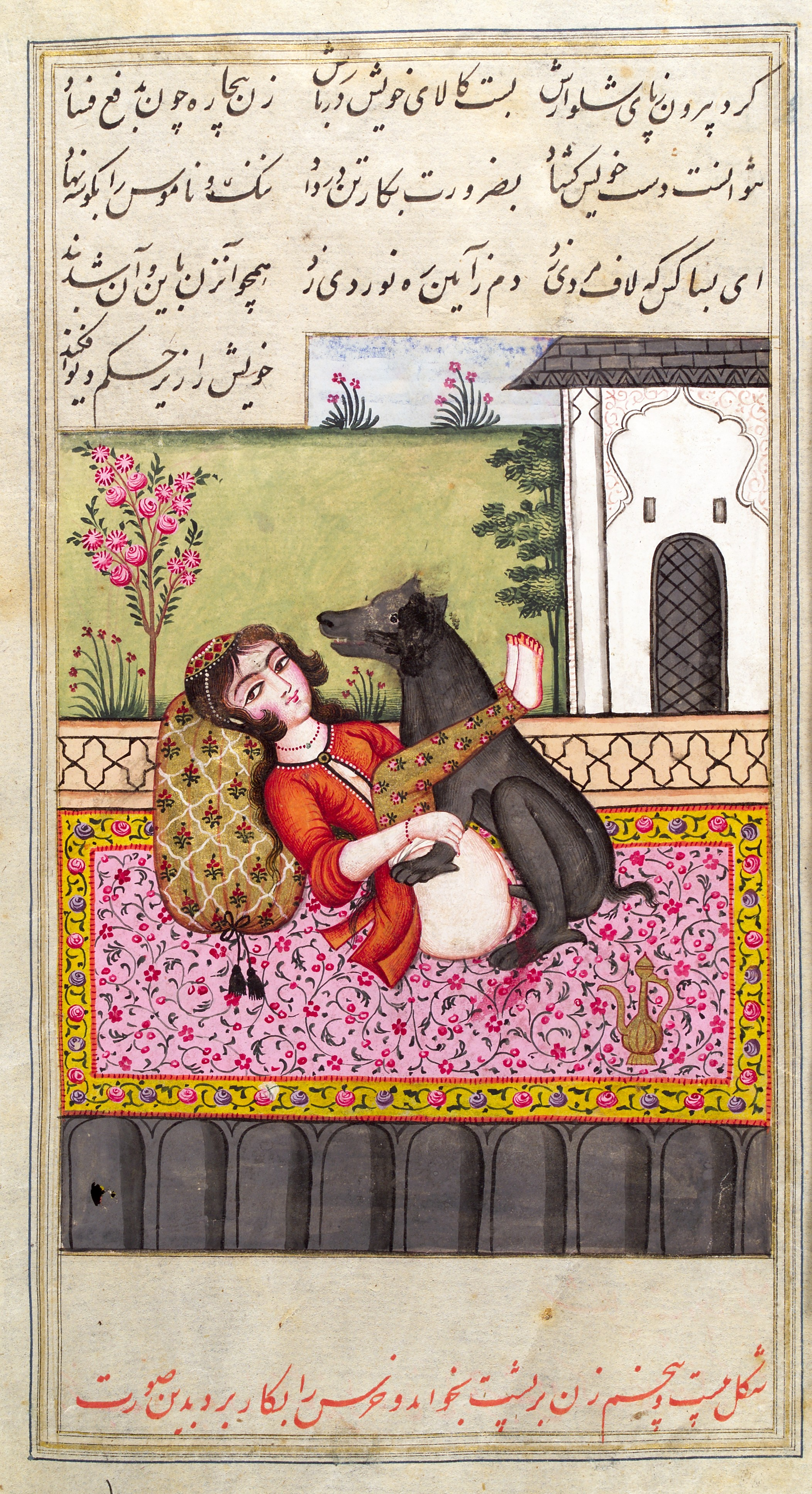
Miniature painting showing a Persian woman copulating with an animal, 9th century AH

In the United States, zoophilic pornography would be considered obscene if it did not meet the standards of the Miller Test and therefore is not openly sold, mailed, distributed or imported across state boundaries or within states which prohibit it. Under U.S. law, 'distribution' includes transmission across the Internet. Many states in the U.S. ban distribution but uniquely the state of Oregon explicitly prohibits possession of media that depicts bestiality when such possession is for erotic purposes.

Similar restrictions apply in Germany (see above). In New Zealand, the possession, making or distribution of material promoting bestiality is illegal.

While bestiality is illegal across Australia, the first state to also ban zoophilic pornography was New South Wales in 2022.

Today, material featuring sex with non-human animals is widely available on the internet, regardless of laws against possession, but films of bestiality have long existed. Polissons and Galipettes (re-released 2002 as "The Good Old Naughty Days") is a collection of early French silent films for brothel use, which included some bestiality, dating from around 1905 – 1930. Another film to attain great infamy was "Animal Farm", smuggled into Great Britain around 1980 without details as to makers or provenance. The film was later traced to a crude juxtaposition of smuggled cuts from many of Bodil Joensen's 1970s Danish movies. In 1972, Linda Lovelace, the star of the film "Deep Throat", appeared in the film "Dogorama" (also released under the titles "Dog 1," "Dog Fucker" and "Dog-a-Rama"), in which she engages in sexual acts with a dog.

In Romania, although zoophilia was officially banned in May 2022, there are no laws which prohibit zoophilic pornography. Creating sites that present zoophilic pornography is not allowed per Article 7.3 of Law 196/2003, but no punishment is defined for doing so.

In Hungary, where production faces no legal limitations, zoophilic materials have become a substantial industry that produces a number of films and magazines, particularly for Dutch companies such as Topscore and Book & Film International, and the genre has stars such as "Hector", a Great Dane dog starring in several films.

In Japan, zoophilic pornography is used to bypass censorship laws, often featuring models performing fellatio on non-human animals, because oral penetration of a non-human penis is not in the scope of Japanese pixelization censorship. While primarily underground, there are a number of zoophilic pornography actresses who specialize in bestiality movies.

In the United Kingdom, Section 63 of the Criminal Justice and Immigration Act 2008 criminalises possession of realistic pornographic images depicting sex with non-human animals (see extreme pornography), including fake images and simulated acts, as well as images depicting sex with dead animals. The law provides for sentences of up to two years in prison; a sentence of 12 months was handed down in one case in 2011.

== See also ==
- Animal roleplay § Erotic scenarios
- Bestiality with a donkey – Sexual relations between humans and donkeys
- Bestiality in ancient Rome – Attitudes and behaviors towards sex in ancient Rome
