= Michael Hames =

British police officer (1945–2025)

Michael David Hames (7 February 1945 – 15 January 2025) was a British police officer who was a Detective Superintendent in the Metropolitan Police.

== Life and career ==
Hames was born in Colchester on 7 February 1945. He was head of the Obscene Publications Branch from 1990 until his retirement in 1994, including being involved in Operation Spanner.

He appeared in several television programmes, including the Dispatches episode "Beyond Belief" in 1992, the Brass Eye episode "Paedogeddon" in 2001, The Dark Side of Porn episode "Does Snuff Exist?" in 2006 and Jimmy Savile: A British Horror Story on Netflix.

Hames died from complications of sepsis and heart failure on 15 January 2025 at the age of 79.
