= Amies =

Amies is a surname. Notable people with the surname include:

- Hardy Amies (1909–2003), English fashion designer and founder of Hardy Amies (fashion house)
- Olive Pond Amies (c. 1844–1917), American educator and editor
- Toby Amies (born 1967), English filmmaker and broadcaster

== See also ==
- Amyes
