= Ali Aamer =

Bahraini footballer

Personal information
- Full name: Ali Aamer Musaifer
- Date of birth: 26 December 1977 (age 48)
- Place of birth: Bahrain
- Height: 1.73 m (5 ft 8 in)
- Position: Midfielder

Team information
- Current team: Muharraq Club

Senior career*
Years	Team	Apps	(Gls)
1995–2015	Muharraq Club		

International career^{‡}
2001–2006	Bahrain	13	(0)
- * Club domestic league appearances and goals as of December 10, 2006 ‡ National team caps and goals as of December 10, 2006

Ali Aamer (Arabic: علي عامر; born December 26, 1977) is a Bahraini footballer who is a midfielder for Muharraq Club. He is a member of the Bahrain national football team.
