= Robert Leycester Haymes =

British Army officer

Lieutenant-Colonel Robert Leycester Haymes DSO
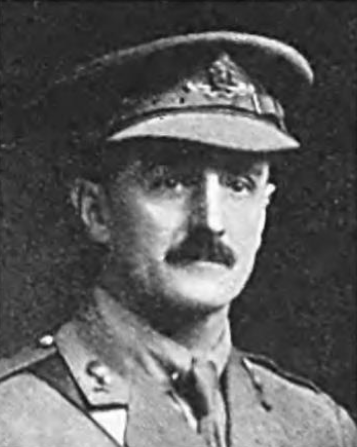
- Born: 31 December 1870; Hopesay, Shropshire, United Kingdom
- Died: 16 May 1942 (aged 71); Surrey, United Kingdom
- Military career
- Allegiance: United Kingdom
- Branch: British Army
- Service years: 1891–1919
- Rank: Lieutenant-Colonel
- Unit: Royal Artillery
- Awards: Distinguished Service Order; Mentioned in Despatches (3)

Lieutenant-Colonel Robert Leycester Haymes DSO (31 December 1870 – 16 May 1942) was a lieutenant-colonel in the British Army, Commander of the 6th Siege Battery during World War I and one of the first officers to establish an OP at the Battle of Neuve Chapelle. A collection of Haymes's World War I photographs held at the Imperial War Museum, taken while he was in the O.P. and Commander of the 6th Siege Battery, provide a unique insight into the early days of World War I including one of the first 9.2-inch howitzers to arrive in Flanders and the Headquarters of the 14th Division at Pont de Nieppe during the visit of King George V and the Prince of Wales on 2 December 1914.

== Early life ==
Haymes was born on 31 December 1870 at Hopesay in Shropshire, England, the son of Jane Henrietta Martha Haymes and the Reverend Robert Evered Haymes. He was educated at Bedford Modern School, the Oxford Military College and the Royal Military Academy, Woolwich.

== Army service ==
He entered the army in 1891 with a commission as a Second Lieutenant in the Royal Artillery, becoming Captain in 1899, an instructor in Gunnery (1905–09), Adjutant (1909–11) and Lieutenant-Colonel (1917). He served in the Native Mountain Artillery, NW Frontier, India (1897–1903) and between 1911 and 1914 Haymes was second in command of the Malay States Guides.

During World War I, Haymes went to France in command of the 6th Siege Battery (September 1914). He took part in the First Battle of Ypres (October–November 1914) and the Battle of Neuve Chapelle (10 March 1915). He was one of the first to establish an OP in the Battle of Neuve Chapelle. After the Battle of Neuve Chapelle Haymes was by mentioned in despatches by Sir Arthur Holland KCB KCMG DSO MVO (then Brigadier General 8th Division) and in June 1915 he was made a Companion of the Distinguished Service Order. In 1915, he was badly wounded in the foot while in command of the 6th Siege Battery and mentioned in despatches twice. Haymes was forced to retire in 1919 on account of wounds.

A collection of photographs taken by Haymes during World War I are now held at the Imperial War Museum providing a unique insight into the early days of World War I. His photographs include one of the first 9.2-inch howitzers (Mother) to arrive in Flanders; the Headquarters of the 14th Division, Pont de Nieppe during the visit of King George VI and Edward VIII on 2 December 1914; the Headquarters of the 1st Cavalry Brigade under General Sir Henry de Beauvoir De Lisle KCB KCMG DSO in November 1914; and the 6th Siege Battery in action registering its guns for the Battle of Neuve Chapelle in March 1915.

== Family life ==
Haymes married in 1897 in Chertsey, Surrey to Minnie Kathleen Ellis with whom he had three sons and two daughters. A son, Richard Arthur Leycester Haymes, was killed in action in Egypt in 1941 while serving as a lieutenant. He was age 26 at the time of his death. Haymes died in Surrey on 16 May 1942.
