= Bodil Joensen =

Danish pornographic actress (1944–1985)

- Born: 25 September 1944; Hundige, Denmark
- Died: 3 January 1985 (aged 40); Copenhagen, Denmark
- Resting place: Højby Church Cemetery; 55°54′46.1″N 11°36′01.7″E
- Occupation: Pornographic actress
- Children: 1

Bodil Bjarta Joensen ([poːtil pjɑːtsʰæ joˀnsn̩]; 25 September 1944 – 3 January 1985) was a Danish pornographic actress known for participating in bestiality porn.

Bodil Joensen grew up in an abusive household and was 12 years old when her parents divorced. She left home at 15 to work on farms and started her own pig farm at 17. This farm, in Odsherred, was where her pornography was filmed.

Joensen began creating pornography with animals in 1969, after Denmark unbanned pornographic films. She appeared in over 40 pornographic films between 1969 and 1972, including a film titled Bodil Joensen: A Summer Day July 1970. This film won a gold medal at an alternative film festival in Amsterdam and made her internationally famous. She also appeared in live sex shows and committed bestiality in clubs with her Collie named Lassie. Joensen also engaged in sex tourism, renting her farm and animals to others to create zoophilic pornography.

Joensen was sent to prison for three days in 1981 for animal abuse and her pigs were euthanized. She died on 3 January 1985. She had one daughter.
