= James Yonge (surgeon) =

English Royal Navy surgeon (1646/1647–1721)

James Yonge (27 February 1646/1647 – 25 July 1721) was a Royal Navy surgeon from Plymouth, England, where his father was a surgeon. He went to sea as an apprentice surgeon as a young boy. Later he joined several voyages with Newfoundland fishing fleets. In his twenties he set up a practice in Plymouth and prospered. He was elected a fellow of the Royal Society in 1702 and mayor of Plymouth for 1694 and 1695. He wrote medical textbooks and a journal of his life.

== Background ==
Little is known of the forebears of James Yonge. His father's origins as a surgeon in the Plymouth area are unclear. He may have come from Ireland as a member of the Protestant ascendancy there. Yonge refers in his Journal to visiting his grandmother in Cork. The accounts in Burke's Landed Gentry that he descended from the Yonges of Colyton, Devon, are unfounded.

Yonge's mother, Joanna Blackaller (1618–1700), was the daughter of Nicholas Blackaller, a merchant of Dartmouth, Devon. His parents were married in St Saviour's, Dartmouth, in September 1640. By the time Yonge was born, his parents had moved to Plymouth, where he was baptised in the Parish Church of St Andrew on 11 March 1647. He was the fifth of seven children, all of whom survived at least to early adulthood.

There is a family story of a quarrel with his brother Nathaniel, who unlike Yonge was not a Royalist. There is evidence that they did not get on in Yonge's Journal.

== Life at sea ==
In 1658 Yonge's father had him articled as an apprentice at the age of ten to Silvester Richmond of Liverpool, a surgeon on the Navy vessel Constant Warwick. He was next appointed surgeon's mate to HMS Montague, part of Lord Sandwich's fleet in the Downs, with which he sailed in 1660, aged 13, for an ineffectual bombardment of Algiers in the following year. He was released from his apprenticeship in May 1662, by his master's retirement, then worked as an assistant at Wapping to an apothecary named Clarke, where he presumably gained practical knowledge of making up medicines.

Yonge returned to Plymouth in September 1662 and was unwillingly bound to his father for another seven years. This action by his father rankled him all his life: "My elder brother was maintained like a prince, I clad with old turned cloaths, and not one penny in my pocket, he was hard as a master."

At sea again, Yonge took voyages to the Newfoundland fisheries, the first in May 1663, aged 16, in the ship Reformation. Yonge spent his time on land walking between settlements, sketching and observing the industry. In January 1666, during the Second Dutch War, his ship the Bonaventure was captured by the Dutch and he was shackled with other prisoners for 51 days. The biography of the Victorian writer Charlotte Mary Yonge by Christabel Coleridge dubs Yonge a galley slave of the Moors, possibly conflating his time as a Dutch prisoner with his naval service off Algiers. In September 1666 he was exchanged for a relative of the secretary of the Dutch Admiralty, who was imprisoned at Harwich.

Yonge made what was to be his final voyage in February 1668, to Newfoundland in the Marigold of Plymouth. He describes his arrival: "Coming up with the ice we find no passage, stand through it and in two hours got on the inside of it ... but not without knocking our ship. find ourselves the first ship in the land and Admiral of St Johns. God be praised for this good landfall and good place!"

== Medicine ==
Yonge returned to Plymouth on 29 September 1670 and established himself in practice, aged 25. He was then appointed surgeon at the Naval Hospital in Plymouth, set up after the outbreak of the Third Anglo-Dutch War in 1672. In 1674, Thomas Pearse, Surgeon-General of the Navy, made Yonge his deputy.

In 1692, after his appointment as surgeon to the new dock at Hamoaze, Plymouth, Yonge had to go to London. While there he attended Edward Tyson's anatomical lectures at Surgeons Hall. In London again in 1702, he was persuaded to sit the examination of the College of Physicians, as an Extra-Licentiate. He states in his Journal that there was no need, as he did not intend to practise in or around London, as he already had licence from the Bishop (presumably the Bishop of Exeter), but the College persuaded him it would add to his status. Yonge corresponded with Sir Hans Sloane and associated in London with Francis Atterbury, Charles Bernard, Edward Browne and Walter Charleton as well as Tyson. He was also a frequent visitor to Oxford, where he catalogued the Ashmolean Museum and was entertained at the University.

Yonge exposed the plagiarism of John Browne, whose Compleat Treatise of the Muscles appeared in a second edition in 1683. Yonge pointed out that it put together text from the Muskotomia of William Molins with illustrations from the Tabula anatomicae of Giulio Casserius.

== Civic affairs ==
By the 1670s Yonge had become of importance, called to fill successive civic and professional offices in Plymouth, whose charter had been restored by Charles II. In 1679 he was elected a life member of the Common Council of the Borough of Plymouth. In 1682 he was appointed a churchwarden at St Andrew's. In 1694 he became an alderman and mayor of Plymouth. He gives an account of his mayoralty in 1694–1695 in Plymouth Memoirs

Dec. the Lord Cutts came to town, Lay at my house. 3 Regiments quartered in town, to be Embarked for the W. India by this Lord, gave me great trouble in Quartering them.... June My Ld Marquis of Carmarthen, son & heir to the duke of Leeds, being Rere Admiral of the blew came into port, spent an evning merryly at my house, & treated me wth r Governor, &c next day on board the Lenox very nobly, wth Gunnes.... In August filld [sic] up both Benches, by chosing In", Rogers, Nics. Edgcumb, Wm• Munyon, and m' Tho Bound Aldermen. Tho Burgoyn, James Bligh, Tho Darracot, Wm Lovel, Ben Berely and Wm Wyat 0who had been my aprenytic, assistants.... The new Key fid up to the outside of the Slipp before Mr Allens house, and all new paved over.

Yonge's brother Nathaniel was also involved in the politics of the town. On his death, Yonge wrote in the Plymouth Memoirs:

"He was a zealot in this new model and I believe the disappointment they met [four Whig magistrates had just died and the two Whig Members of Parliament for Plymouth been replaced by Tories] and the odium they contracted help to bring ye asthma on him."

In his Plymouth Memoirs Yonge gives short biographies of mayors in his time, containing "ye memorable occurrences in their respective yeares". For example:

"Rob Brown Mayor 1711 Was chosen the usual day. A tool, & a fool, dyed soon after, and was succeed[ed] by B. Berry, who served the rest of the yeare: and having no house in town, Lodged and Kept the Mayoralty at an house that was common for quarting strangers, & selling punch, Ale, to the great scandal of the office... but they stuck at nothing, -seemd [sic] to regard neither the credit, or welfare of the town, filled up ye benches with men that were of mean, Scandalous, --- as if they had been sworn to choos the worst --- and did many things contrary to the constitution, & custom of the Burrough, chose a Mayor that did not Inhabit, filled the Benches with Lawyers."

== Naval surgeon ==
Yonge held the appointment as surgeon to the Devonport dockyard from 1692 to April 1701. Towards the end of his tenure at the end of the 17th century, a residential terrace was built at the dockyard for senior officers. Most of this was destroyed in the Second World War, but Yonge's part survives. He wrote in his Journal:

"in May this year I got a warrant to be Surgeon of the Navy and yard at Plymouth, Capt. Hen. Greenhill Commander, John Addis, clerk of the chequer, Mr. Stollard master attendant, Mr. Watt master builder, Mr. Gazby store keeper, Mr. Rob. Yonge clerk of the ropeway, Mr. Thomas Yeo master ropemaker, Mr. Chavy mast-maker, Mr. Jethro Brown boatswain of the yard, Mr. Richard Lea clerk of the survey, Mr. Israel Pownel builder's assistant, Mr. Spickerwell master caulker, and myself surgeon, with Mr. Perry as porter. These were officers that had houses in the yard; the sailmaker, joiner, bricklayer, &c. had none. We all very fine houses, stables, gardens, &c., but did not live easy under the Commander, who was a proud, morose man."

Yonge's service for the Navy ended on an unhappy note in 1701. As he wrote in his Journal:

1701. The beginning of this year, April 25, I was displaced from the dock by the false accusation of Comr St Lo. He had attempted it twice before, but then the Lords of Admiralty made enquiry into the matter and found me innocent but notwithstanding that and a promise they made not to hearken any more to him, they did on this third wrong information put me out without notice or hearing and this injustice he got by quitting Weymouth to Col Churchill's brother.

== Financial rewards ==
In his Journal Yonge refers to 12 shillings as the fee for a twenty-mile visit, another £1, and, for an outside visit of two days' duration, £1 10s. Bleeding a lady in bed cost 10 shillings, as against 2 shillings and sixpence for a man. A post mortem 3 shillings and fourpence.

During the late 17th century, Yonge seems to have travelled over Devon and Cornwall. He gave his earnings for one year, receiving £40 for 12 days treatment for a man run through with a blade, a lady at Butshead that he often had to visit £40 a year, tapping Mr Pake 25 guineas [£26.25] etc., curing 9 fistulas for which he got between £30 and £70 each, treating an ulcer in the bladder for four years £200 etc. He earned twice a hundred guineas for a single operation, boasting that he obtained £120 in one year for treating sailors for the pox (syphilis) in the naval hospital at Plymouth.

One of the last commissions he refers to in his Journal is embalming a body in preparation for the lying in state in London of Admiral Sir Cloudesley Shovell, who drowned off the Scilly Isles in one of the worst peacetime disasters of the Royal Navy. For this he was paid £50.

Once his name was made, Yonge's role resembled that of a consultant or society doctor. He amassed a large fortune through hard work and one suspects hard commercial thinking. A document in the Plymouth and West Devon Record Office shows his assets and income in 1718 at £21,000 – remarkable from a medical practice. It is hard to compare monetary value with today, but as an example from several sources, an average farm labourer in 1718 earned £18 a year and an attorney £120. Yonge's wealth placed the family in society for generations to come.

== Death ==
Yonge died on 25 July 1721 and was buried in the Church of St Andrew, Plymouth. A memorial was erected, but apparently destroyed in the Second World War, when the church was badly damaged. An old church guide quotes it:

"Here underneath lyeth buried the body of James Yonge physitian. Fellow of the Royal Society. He was once mayor of his native town and dyeth the 25th day of July 1721 in the 76th year of his age."

== Publications ==
Yonge's best known work is his Journal, published in 1963 by Frederick Noël Lawrence Poynter as The Journal of James Yonge, Plymouth Surgeon. It gives a complete account of his life from the age of ten to 61 and is viewed as the most important 17th-century diary after those of Samuel Pepys and John Evelyn. In it are mentioned famous people he had seen in his travels:

Sebastian King of Portugal a fool and a sot
George Duke of Buckingham a very handsome and accomplished person a wit and a debaucheer

In 1678 Yonge visited London with John Sparke, member of Parliament for Plymouth, and while there met members of the Royal Society. This led him to write Currus Triumphalis de Terebintho, describing how he used turpentine to arrest a haemorrhage and the flap operation in amputation, and showing familiarity with tourniquets. On 3 November 1702 Yonge was elected a Fellow of the Royal Society and made contributions to the Philosophical Transactions on subjects as diverse as "on a bullet in the trachea, on two huge gallstones and on intestinal concretion". In correspondence with Charles Goodall he noted the application of lemon juice as good for the gums in cases of scurvy.

Yonge published in 1685 Medicaster Medicatus, criticizing John Browne and William Salmon, and in 1699 Sidrophel Vapulans: or, The Quack-Astrologer tossed in a blanket, again criticizing Salmon, who was a well-known empiric. Yonge returned to attack him at the prompting of Charles Goodall, having quarrelled with Richard Boulton, an ally of Salmon, over comments on Charles Leigh. In Sidrophel Vapulans, He wrote on the large number of unqualified people practising medicine, saying it was "a great wonder that in this age of regulation and amendment nothing is done to rectify the notorious abuses and secure us from the mischief done by those men who without skill or authority under he pretence of restoring and preserving do destroy men's lives and estates and more especially at such a time when the Nation is in need of both for its defence and preservation.... Why then should impudent ignorant quack and empirics (smiths weavers cobblers draymen women etc.) boldly and unaccountably take upon them great cures and things of great difficulty in which they partly use sorcery, witchcraft, [cause] grievous hurt damage and destruction of many of the Kings liege people, most especially of them that can not discern the uncunning from the comic cunning[?]"

Yonge did not get everything right. Also in Sidrophel Vapulans he wrote:

How absurd it is to affirm that a bright and dark moon shall have the same effect, that a body fourteen times less than the Earth and at such a great distance from it shall press the ocean to such an extent and while its in the like situation force it to retire.... So the cause of the motion seems as that of the heart only known to him that made it.

Most of Yonge's published works were on surgical procedures. He was probably the first in England to perform a successful brain operation. Because few believed him, he published in 1682 a treatise entitled "Wounds of the Braine Proved Curable", based on several of his cases. He left details of an early trepanning operation performed on a man who "by a prodigious wound in the forehead lost as much brain as the shell of a pullets egg can contain and was cured in Plimmouth by J. Y. 1686."

Yonge published Several Evidences to show that Eikon Basilike was written by Charles I. Modern research, however, ascribes it to John Gauden.

== Family ==
Yonge married on 28 March 1671 Jane, daughter of Thomas Crampporne of Buckland Monachorum in Devon. By her he had two sons, the elder predeceasing him, and six daughters, of whom only one, Johanna, survived to adulthood to have a family of her own.

His brother Samuel wrote a work entitled "A Censure of Three Scandalous pamphlets, and in it he commented on Yonge:

"I am sorry to say my Prefacer [Yonge] a great friend to all dissenters, went to all their meetings, contributions etc. till he was forced to go to sacrament to get the hospital at Plymouth and then he baulked at complying and was dragged to the Lords table and then became one of the greatest enemies they had."

Yonge's eldest son James Yonge (1679–1718) married Mary Upton, daughter and heir of John Upton of Puslinch, Newton Ferrers, Devon. Yonge made this possible by paying off Upton's debts and mortgages and building a new Puslinch House for some £10,000. The house remains in Yonge family ownership.
