= Ruini =

Ruini is a surname. Notable people with the surname include:

- Camillo Ruini (born 1931), Italian prelate of the Catholic Church
- Carlo Ruini (1530–1598), Italian anatomist
- Meuccio Ruini (1877–1970), Italian politician

== See also ==
- Ruini Firenze, sports club
