= William Salmon =

17th and 18th-century English empiric doctor

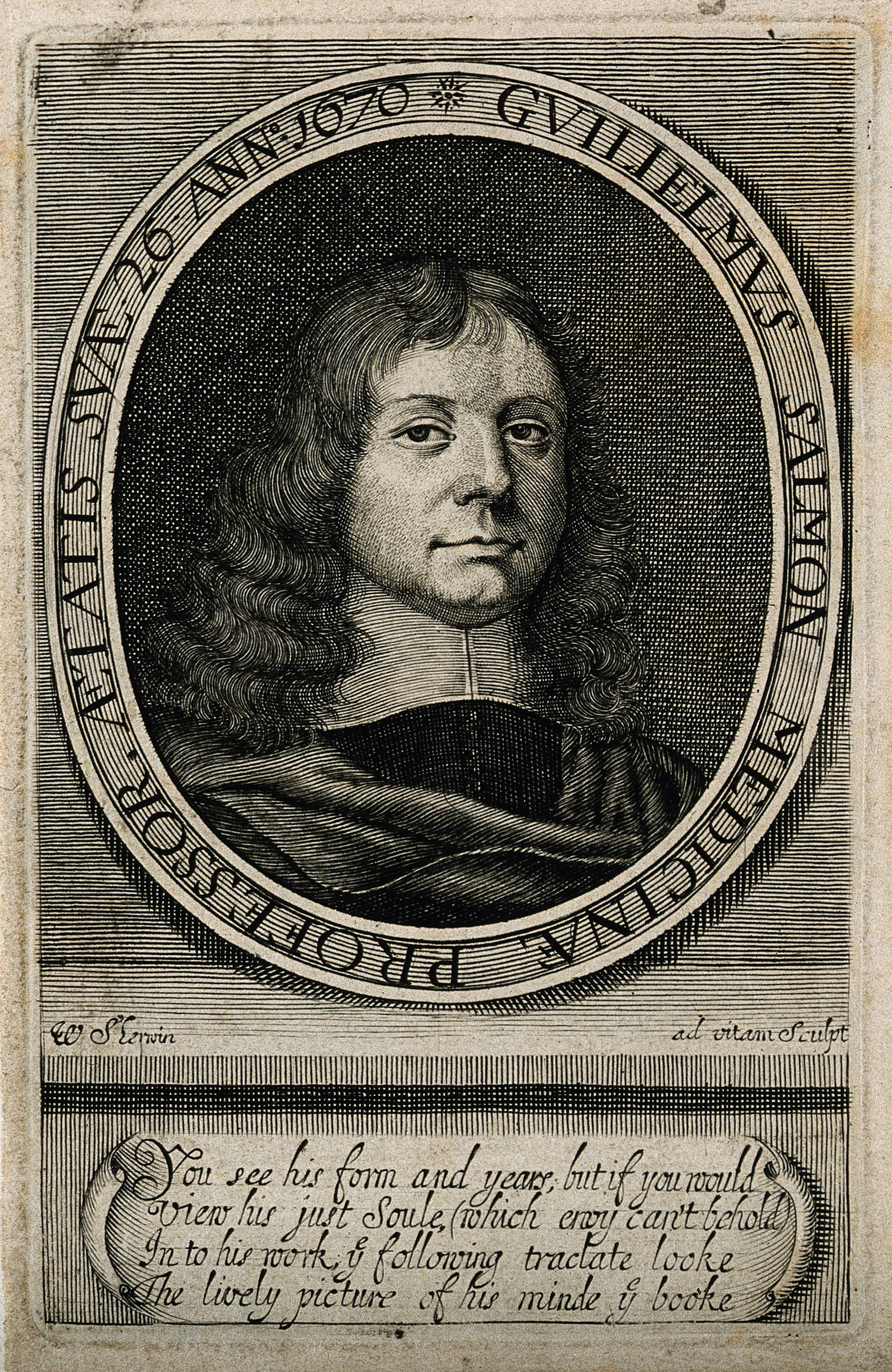
William Salmon by W. Sherwin, 1671

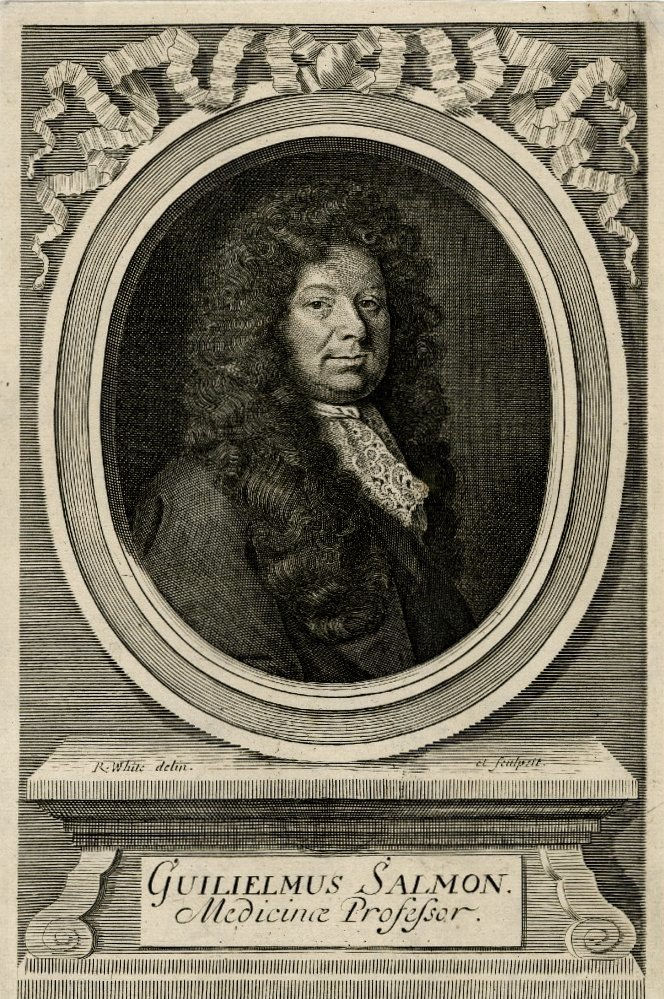
William Salmon by Robert White, 1700

William Salmon (2 June 1644–1713) was an English empiric doctor and a writer of medical texts. He advertised himself as a "Professor of Physick". Salmon held an equivocal place in the medical community. He led apothecaries in opposing attempts by physicians to control the dispensing of medicines, and was derided by physicians as "the King of the Quacks". He has been described as "a brilliant publicist, but not much of a philosopher".

Salmon "copied, translated, abridged, enlarged and compiled from the texts of others" to create popular books emphasizing practice over theory, and often marketing his own medications. A prolific author on a broad range of medical topics, Salmon's works were widely read in his time. His books were owned by respected men including Isaac Newton, Daniel Defoe, William Congreve and Samuel Johnson.

== Life ==
According to an inscription under his portrait in Ars Anatomica (1714), William Salmon was born on 2 June 1644. Almost nothing is known about his upbringing or his education. He may have travelled in New England or the West Indies. It was rumoured that his earliest teacher was a travelling charlatan from whom he inherited his original stock-in-trade.

Salmon set up in business near the Smithfield gate of St. Bartholomew's Hospital in London, where he could attract patients who did not receive treatment at the hospital. He treated diseases, compounded and sold prescriptions, cast horoscopes, and studied alchemy, all "form[s] of medical practice common at the time". By 1681 he had moved to the Red Balls in Salisbury Court off Fleet Street. He then lived briefly in George Yard, near Broken Wharf. In 1684, Salmon moved to the Blue Balcony by the ditch side, near Holborn Bridge, living there until 1692. By 1698, when he published Ars chirurgica, he indicated that his residence was the Great House by Black Friars' Stairs.

William Salmon fills his medical works with observations about cases, but the extent to which he draws on other authors makes it difficult to characterize his personal practice. Nonetheless, from the focus of his books, it is clear that he emphasized Medicina practica, or, Practical physick. He recommended herbal preparations such as the "spirituous tincture" of dried lavender to cure "hysterick fits" and as a poultice for bites. His descriptions of senile dementia suggest careful observation: he described a patient as "not mad, or distracted like a man in Bedlam", but rather "decayed in his wits". He identified depression and hypochondriasis as symptomatic of senility's early stages.

Salmon produced proprietary medicinal products that included pills, powders, elixirs and lozenges, sometimes with accompanying instructions e.g. The Vertues and Use of Dr. William Salmon Family Pills. His products were heavily promoted in his published books.

William Salmon's (1644-1713) method of advertising exhibits nothing that is antiquated even in the eyes of this shop-window age. The writing of elaborate treatises with a profound air, in a learned style, and to sell the same at substantial prices, with the purpose of keeping oneself in the publick eye, cannot be excelled by modern medical pundits. – Kronos, 1905

Critics differ in their opinions on Salmon's writing style. In his books Salmon uses a mixture of the language of 'modern' chemistry and philosophy and the language of older Galenic medicine. It has been argued that such a mixture of terms would have been acceptable at the time and provided "good advertising copy". Salmon has been described as "modern, traditionally learned, and commercially minded". Others have described Salmon's style less charitably as "absurd rhetoric".

He actively challenged attempts by others to use his name and mark to advertise their own products. He successfully allied with other apothecaries in blocking an attempt by the Royal College of Physicians to "Monopolize all the practise of Physick into their own hands" in the 1690s. This controversy was part of a longer and broader contention between physicians and apothecaries over the control of medical education and practice. In this context, Salmon and Nicholas Culpepper have been classed as reformers.

Partly as a result of such tensions, Salmon became a target of satire and "collegiate obloquy." Surgeon James Yonge published the pamphlet Medicaster medicatus, or, A remedy for the itch of scribbling (1685) criticizing the writings of John Browne and of William Salmon. In 1699 Yonge's Sidrophel Vapulans: or, The Quack-Astrologer tossed in a blanket was directed at Salmon, and he was satirized in physician Sir Samuel Garth's mock-heroic poem, "The Dispensary". Salmon is also referred to in the satirical poem "Hermetick Raptures", as a "little Salmon trout" who industriously plys his "Fam'ly Pills".

Between his medical practice, the sale of medicines, and the sales of his books, Salmon is presumed to have had a considerable income. He accumulated an extensive library, and owned scientific and mathematical instruments including two microscopes and a calculating device called Napier's bones. "If one may judge by his library, Salmon must have been a man of erudition, and of wide and liberal tastes; he must also have been a thorough-going bibliophile and possessed of means sufficient to gratify his acquisitiveness." In addition to his collection of books, he owned curiosities from the West Indies, and paintings from the Netherlands, again indicating well-off status.

He attended the meetings of a religious sect at the Leathersellers' Hall in London. It is possible that it was related to the Society of Friends, as he published An apology for the innocency and justice of the Quakers cause. And a short elucidation of their principles in 1674. From 1687 to 1690, a period of religious and political tension in the reign of James II of England, Salmon is said to have left England and travelled in New England and the Caribbean. After his return, he wrote books on baptism and transubstantiation which are listed in A Descriptive Catalogue of Friends' Books. A Discourse against Transubstantiation (1690) was written in the form of a dialogue between a Protestant and a Catholic. A Discourse on Water Baptism appeared in 1700.

Salmon's works frequently included portraits, with surrounding details that vary between editions. George Vertue lists several portraits of Salmon in A catalogue of engravers (1782). Robert White is credited with a portrait of "William Salmon, M.D." in 1700, while a painter named Burnford "is known only by a print of William Salmon, chymist, 1681." A third portrait by William Sherwin, dating to 1670, is included in Portraits of doctors & scientists in the Wellcome Institute of the History of Medicine. Other engravings include one by Michael Vandergucht after White.

== Works ==
Salmon's published works covered an incredibly wide range of topics, including pharmacology, medicine, surgery, alchemy, chiromancy, astrology, almanacs, botany, cooking, and art. In part, he was able to publish so prolifically because large sections of his texts were "copied, translated, abridged, enlarged and compiled from the texts of others". Salmon openly acknowledged that much of his work was derivative, stating "we have scrutinized the best Authors, to many of which we have been very much beholden", with an extensive list of members of the Mathematical, Medical, and Chyrurick Tribes, as well as Anatomists, chymists, and a multitude of others. Even by the standards of his time, he was criticized for failing to individually credit the sources from which specific materials were taken. In addition, instead of taking a specific philosophical position and siding with one of the competing schools of medical thought, Salmon created "a compendium of everything". The publication history of his books is complicated, as subsequent editions of a title often added more and more material. For example, the 1701 edition of Polygraphice was almost three times the length of the first edition.

In 1671 Salmon published Synopsis Medicinæ, or a Compendium of Astrological, Galenical, and Chymical Physick, in three books. Although he dedicated the volumes to Dr. Peter Salmon and Thomas Salmon of Hackney, there is no evidence to indicate that they were in any way related. The work also included laudatory verses by Henry Coley and others. The publisher of Synopsis Medicinæ was Richard Jones of the Golden Lion in Little Britain. A second edition appeared in 1681, a reissue in 1685, and a fourth edition in 1699.

In 1672 the same publisher, Richard Jones, brought out Salmon's Polygraphice, the Art of Drawing, Engraving, Etching, Limning, Painting, Washing, Varnishing, Colouring, and Dyeing. The first edition was dedicated to Peter Stanley of Alderley. Like Salmon's medical books, it emphasized techniques, meeting "a thirst for practical production skills". In subsequent editions, lavish illustrations were added and the range of topics was extended to include cosmetics, chiromancy, alchemy, hermetic philosophy, and medicine. Considerable scientific information was included, e.g. fifty experiments published by Robert Boyle in his Experiments touching colour.

Polygraphice was probably Salmon's most successful book. It went through eight editions and sold 15,000 copies by 1701, and held sustained popularity as an art manual. It was one of the earliest and most successful "printed academies", with wide geographical impact. Such works supported the transfer or visual knowledge and helped to create a broad taste for art. Expanding far beyond their initially intended audience of amateur and profession artists and craftsmen, they found a dominant audience among middle and upper-class women.

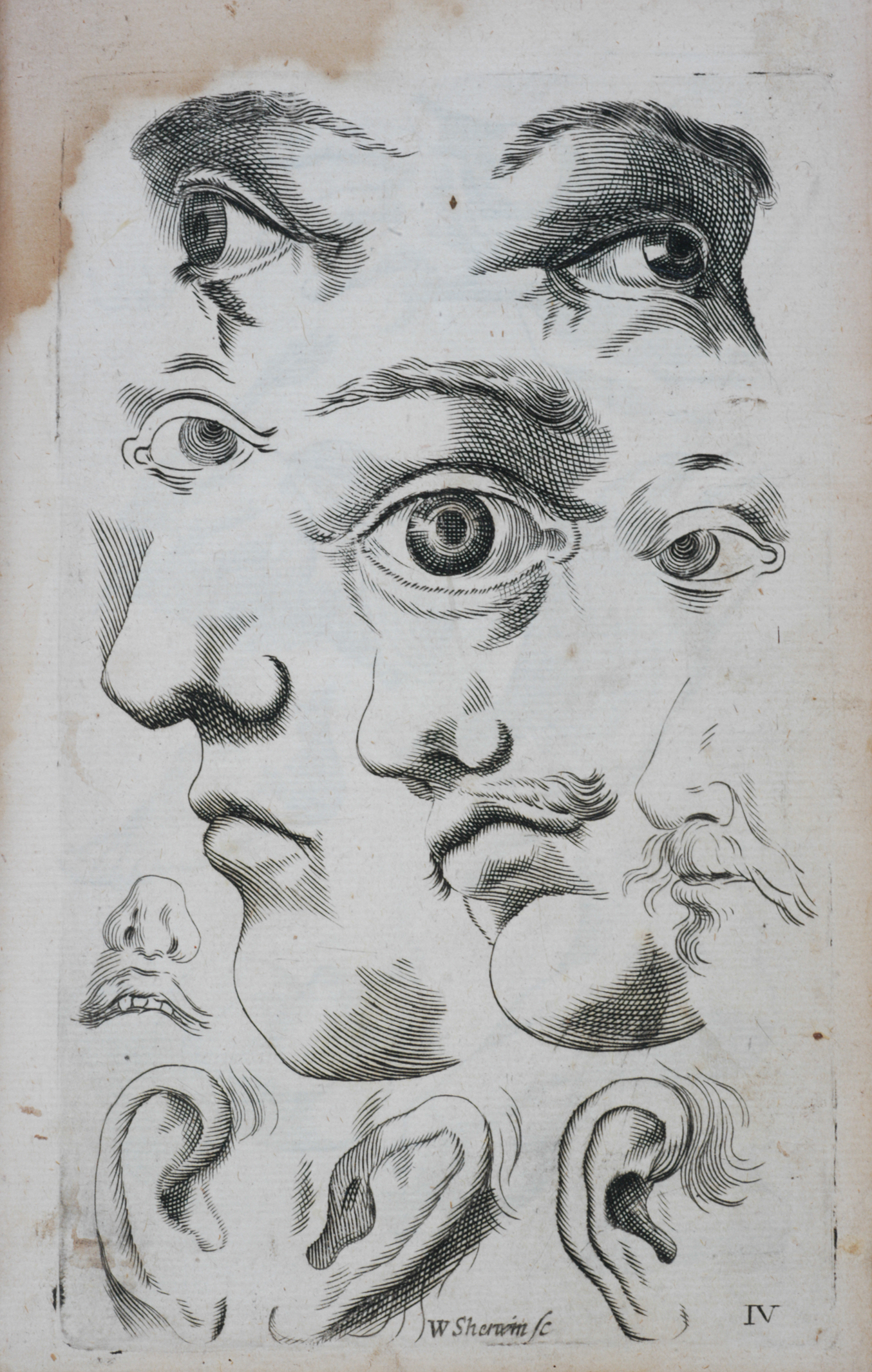
Polygraphice, Plate IV (facial features)

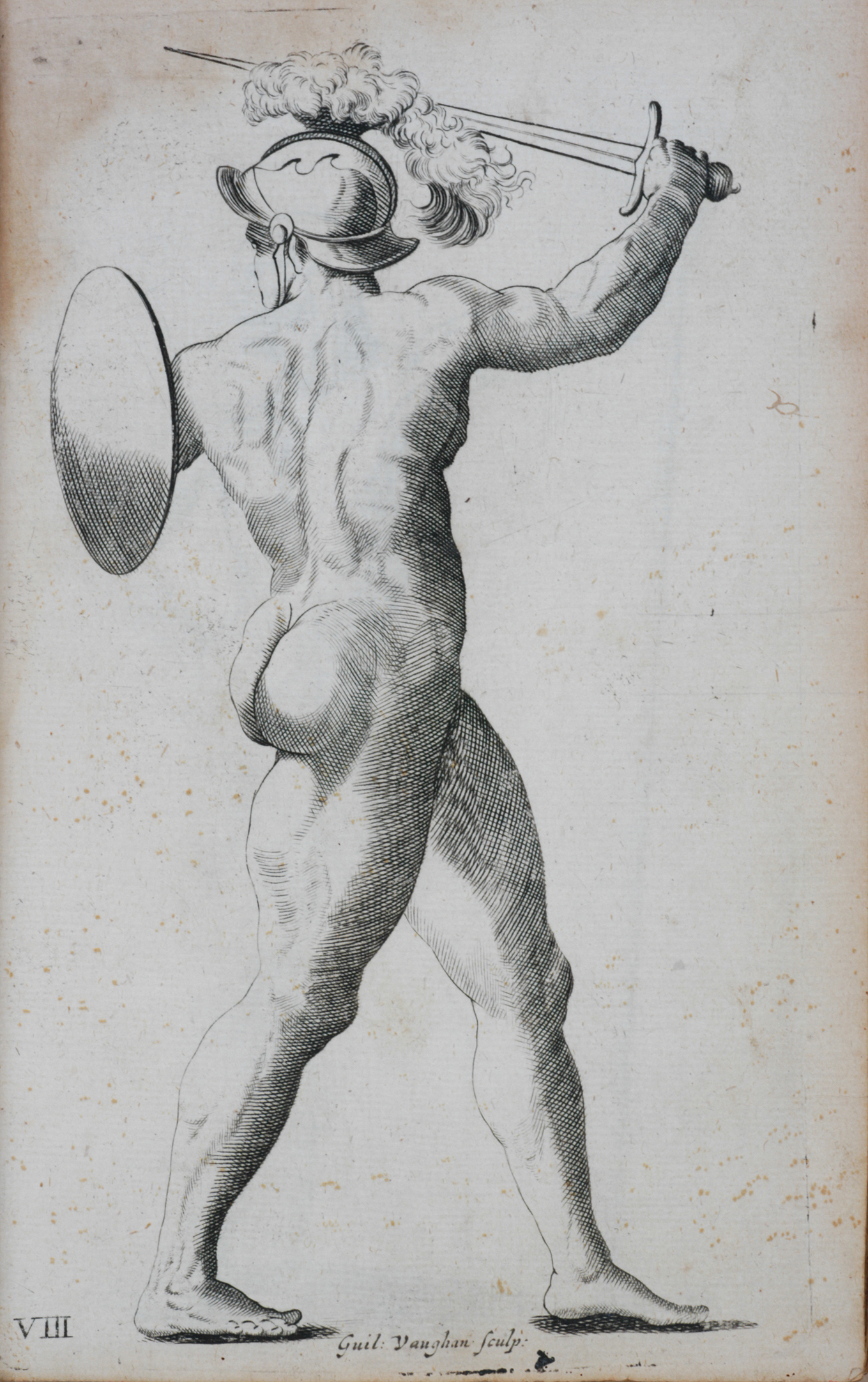
Polygraphice, Plate VIII (soldier)

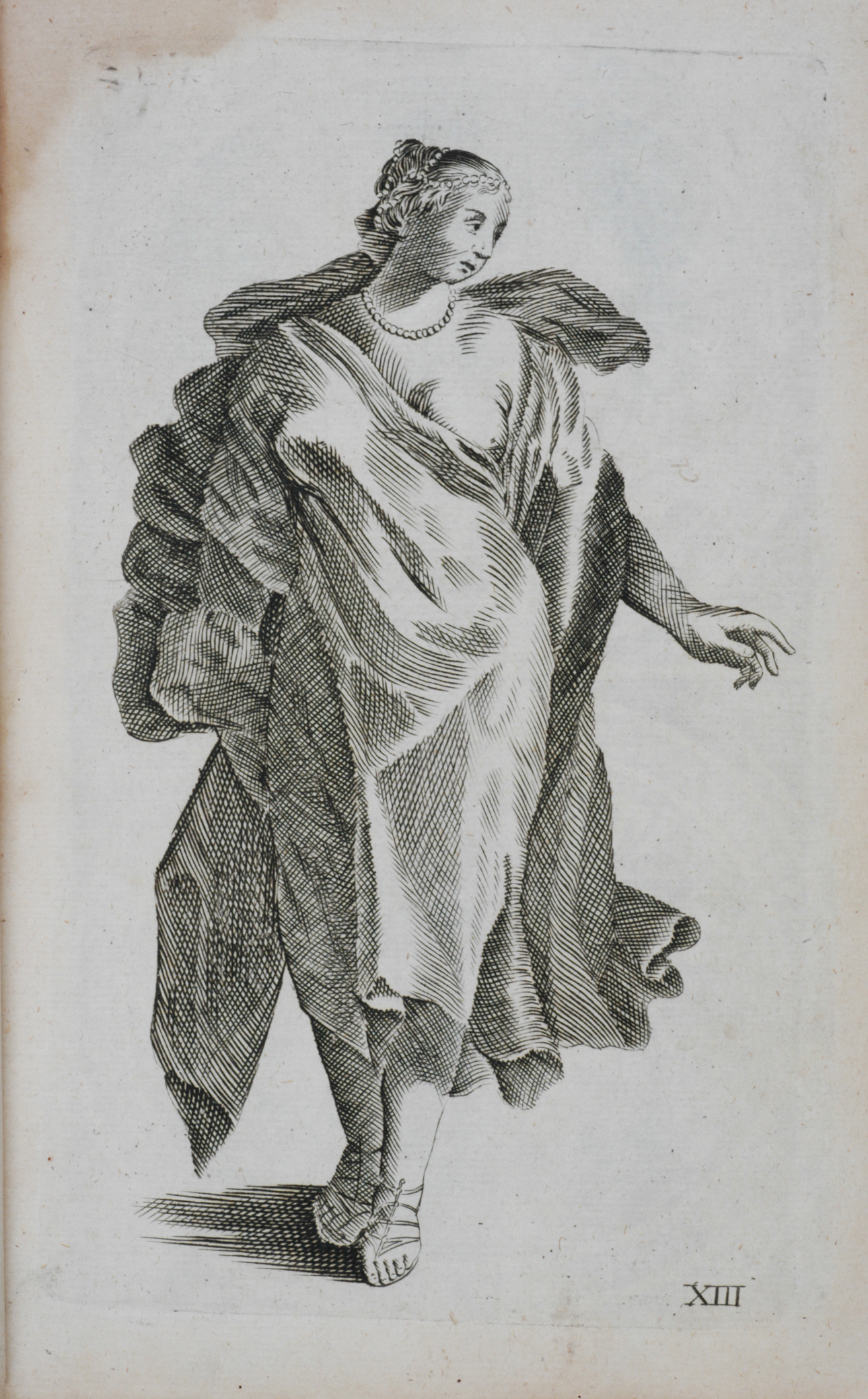
Polygraphice, Plate XIII (woman)

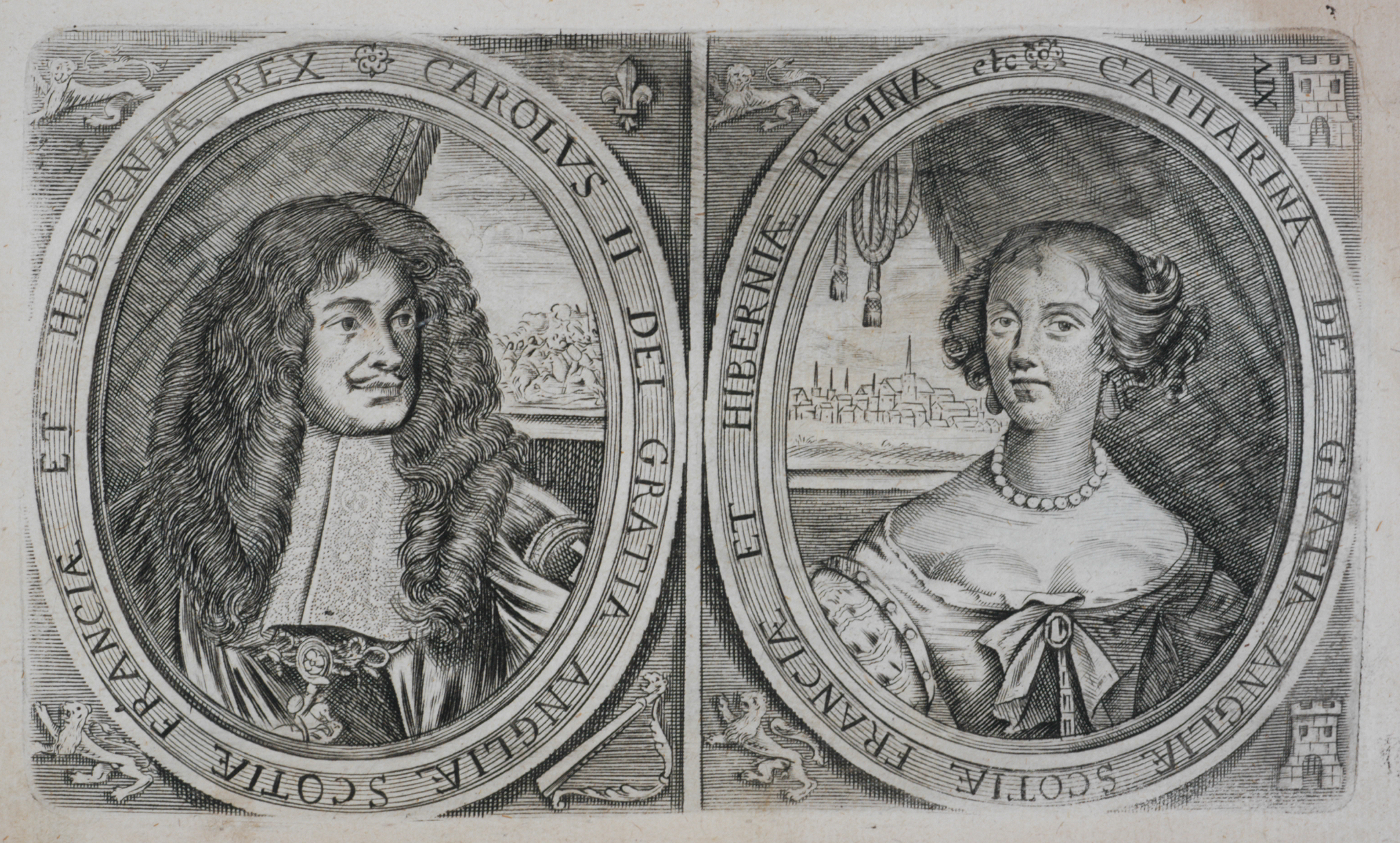
Polygraphice, Plate XIV, portraits of Charles II of England and Catherine of Braganza

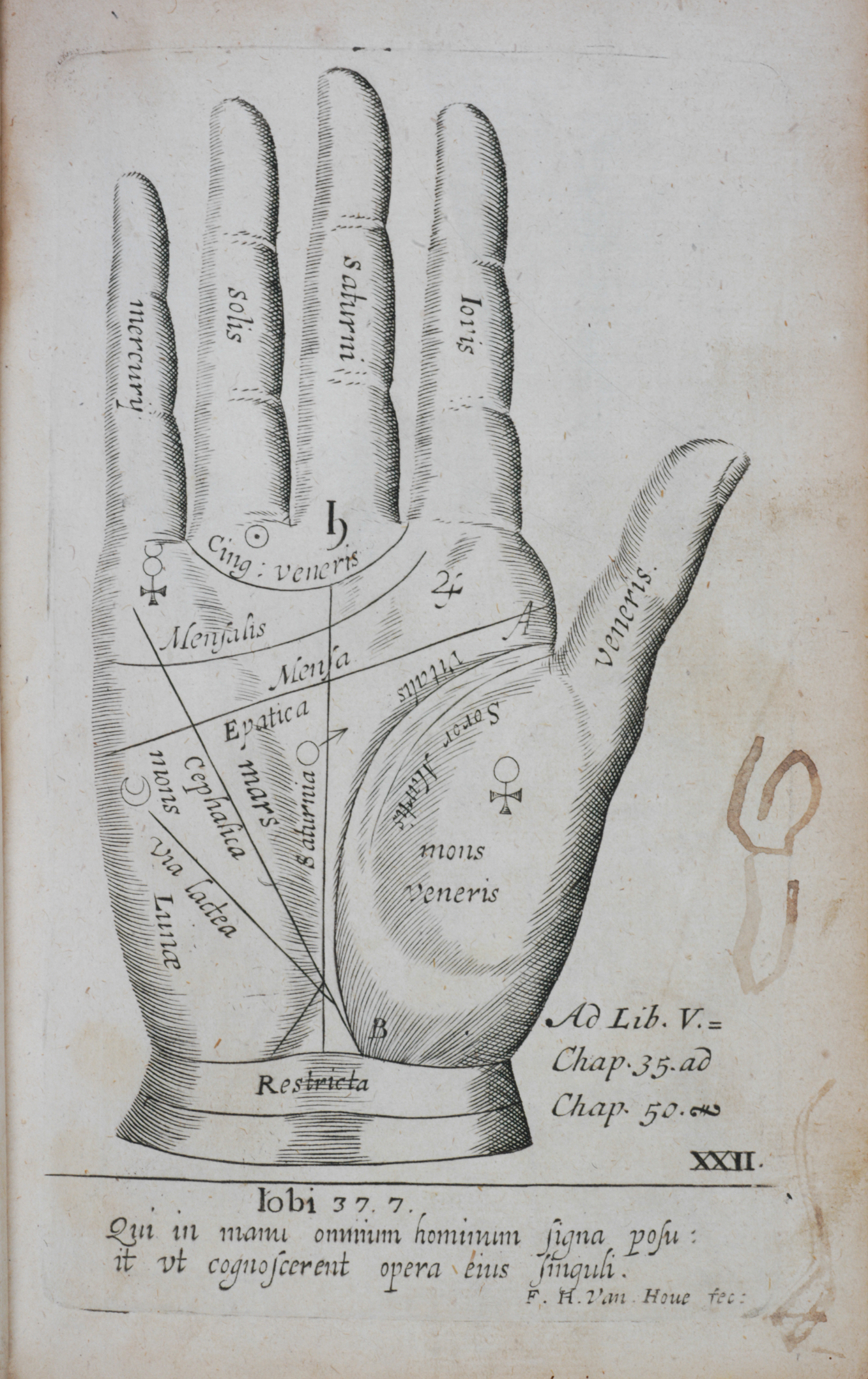
Polygraphice, Plate XXII (chiromantic right hand)

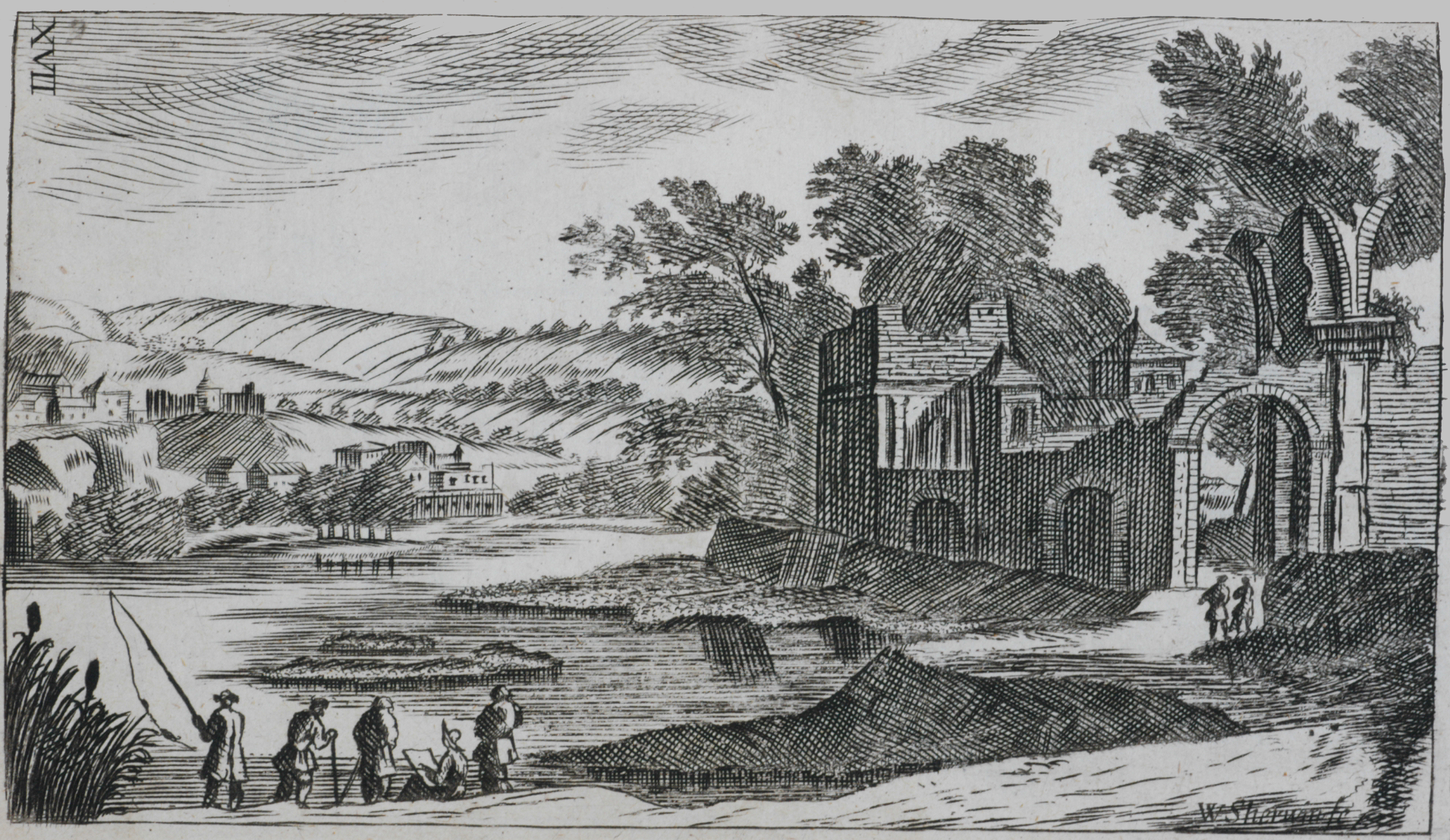
Plate XVII (landscape)

In 1678, publisher Thomas Dawks released the first edition of Salmon's Pharmacopœia Londinensis. Or, the New London Dispensatory. In six volumes, it purported to cover "the whole Art of Healing", giving practical advice "translated into English for the publick Good".

In 1679 Dawks released Salmon's Horæ Mathematicæ seu Urania – The Soul of Astrology. Dawks also reissued Sytema Medicinale (1681) and published Salmon's Iatrica, seu, Praxis medendi, The practice of curing being a medicinal history of above three thousand famous observations in the cure of diseases (1681, reissued 1684). In 1683, Dawks published Doron Medicon: Or a supplement to the New London Dispensatory.

In 1684, Salmon published the first in a series of prophetic almanacs which appeared regularly between 1691 and 1706. Among other materials, his London Almanack featured an ailment of the month with suggested "physical recipes" for its treatment, advertisements for his medicines, and complaints about competitors like astrologer Joseph Blagrave.

In 1687 Salmon published Paraieremata, or Select Physical and Chirurgical Observations. In 1689 he published The anatomy of human bodies, a translation of Isbrand van Diemerbroeck of Utrecht. It was reprinted in 1694.

His Medicina Practica, with the Claris Alcymiae (3 vols. London, 1692), a vademecum combining medicine with alchemy, reveals its scope in its subtitle:

Practical Physick. Shewing the Method of Curing the most Usual Diseases Happening to Humane bodies. As all Sorts of Aches and Pains, Apoplexies, Agues, Bleeding, Fluxes, Gripings, Wind, Shortness of breath, Diseases of the Breast and Lungs, Abortion, Want of Appetite, Loss of the use of Limbs, Cholick, or Belly-ache, Appositions, Thrushes, Quinsies, Deafness, Bubo's, Cachexis, Stone in the Reins, and Stone in the Bladder... To which is added, The philosophick Works of Hermes Trismegistus, Kalid Persicus, Geber Arabs, Artesius Longævus, Nicholas Flammel, Roger Bacon, and George Ripley. All Translated out of The best Latin Editions, into English...

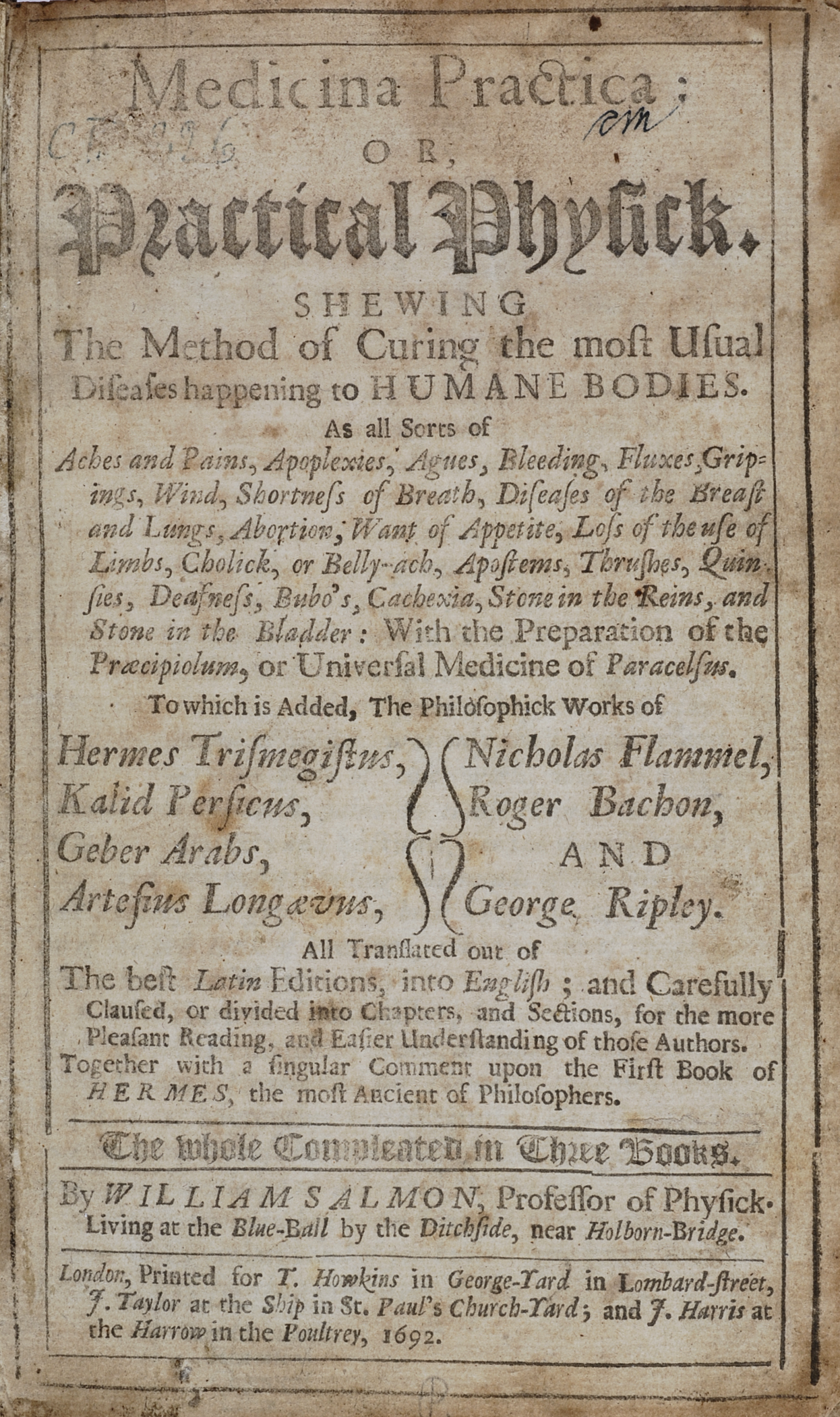
Medicina Practica, Main title page, 1692

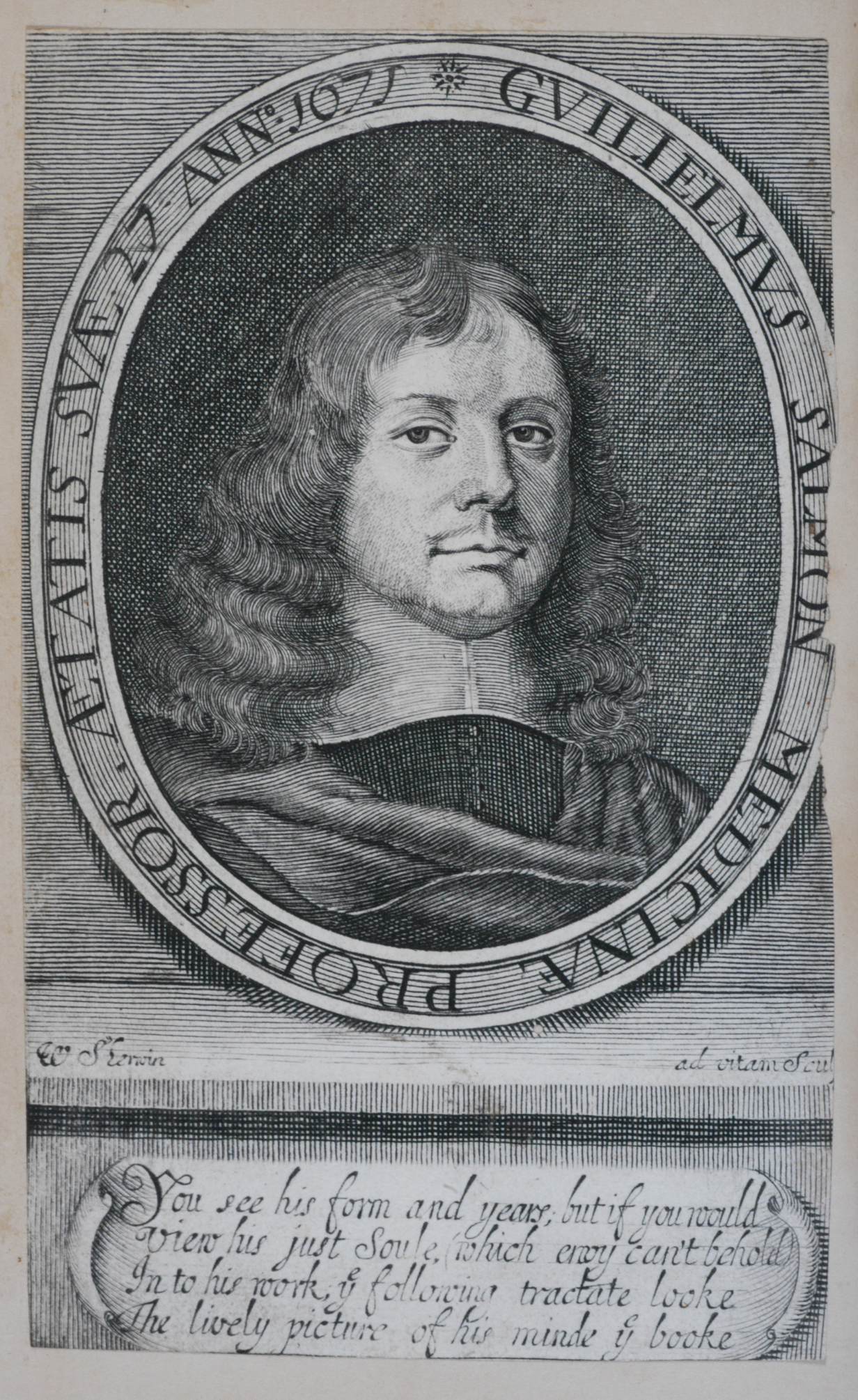
Frontispiece, William Salmon by William Sherwin, 1671

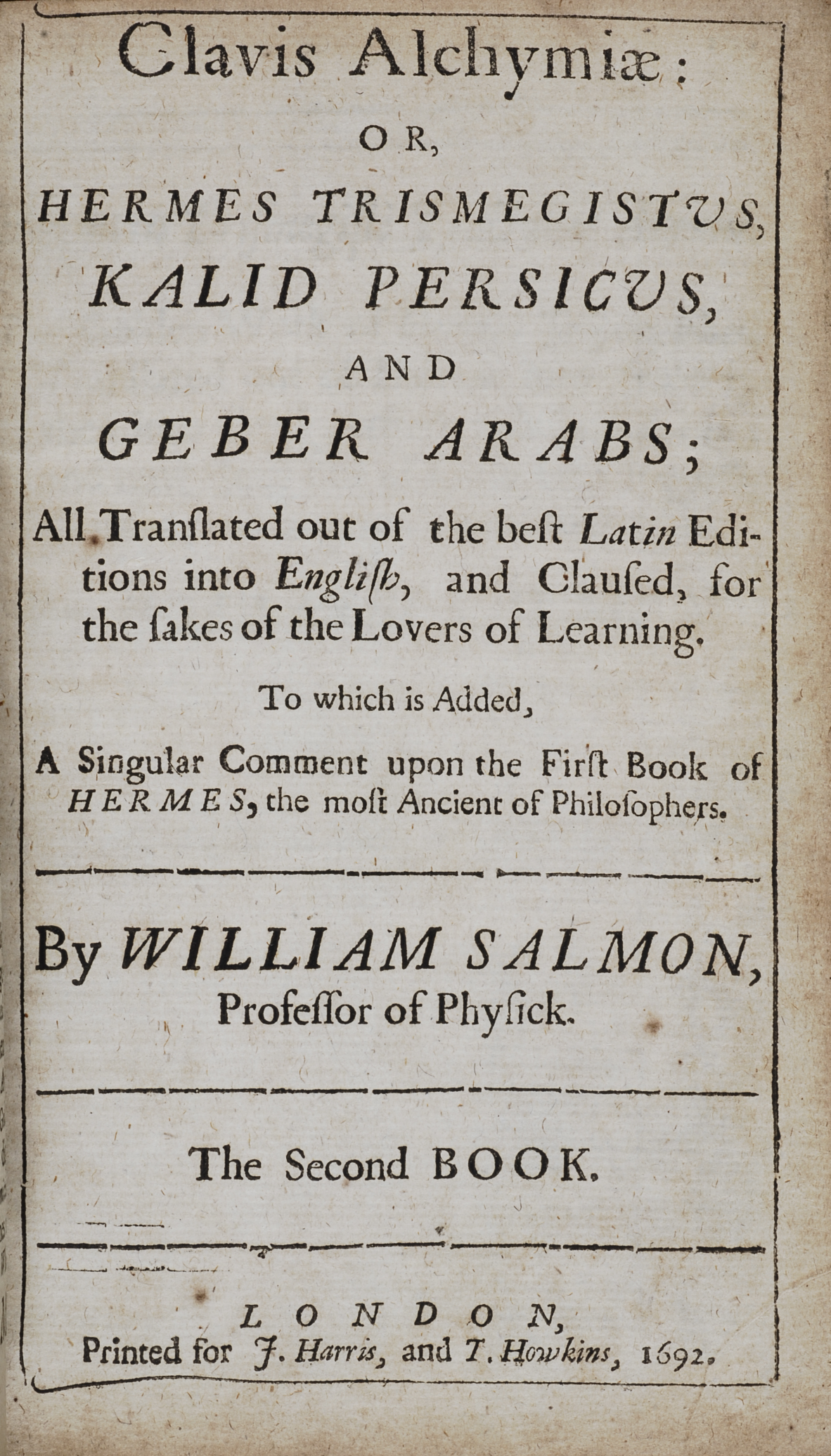
Book II title page

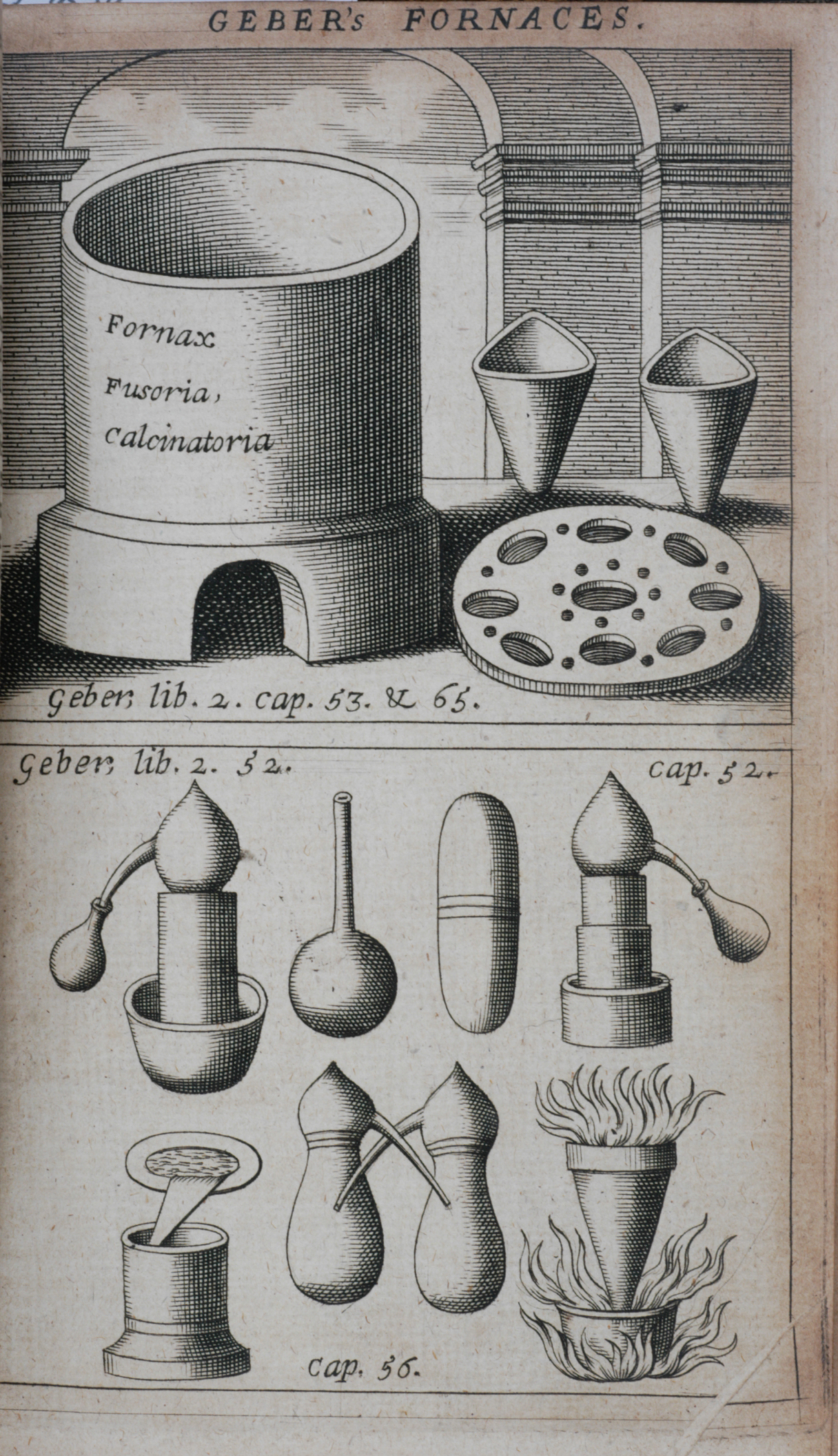
Book II, Plate I, Geber's furnaces

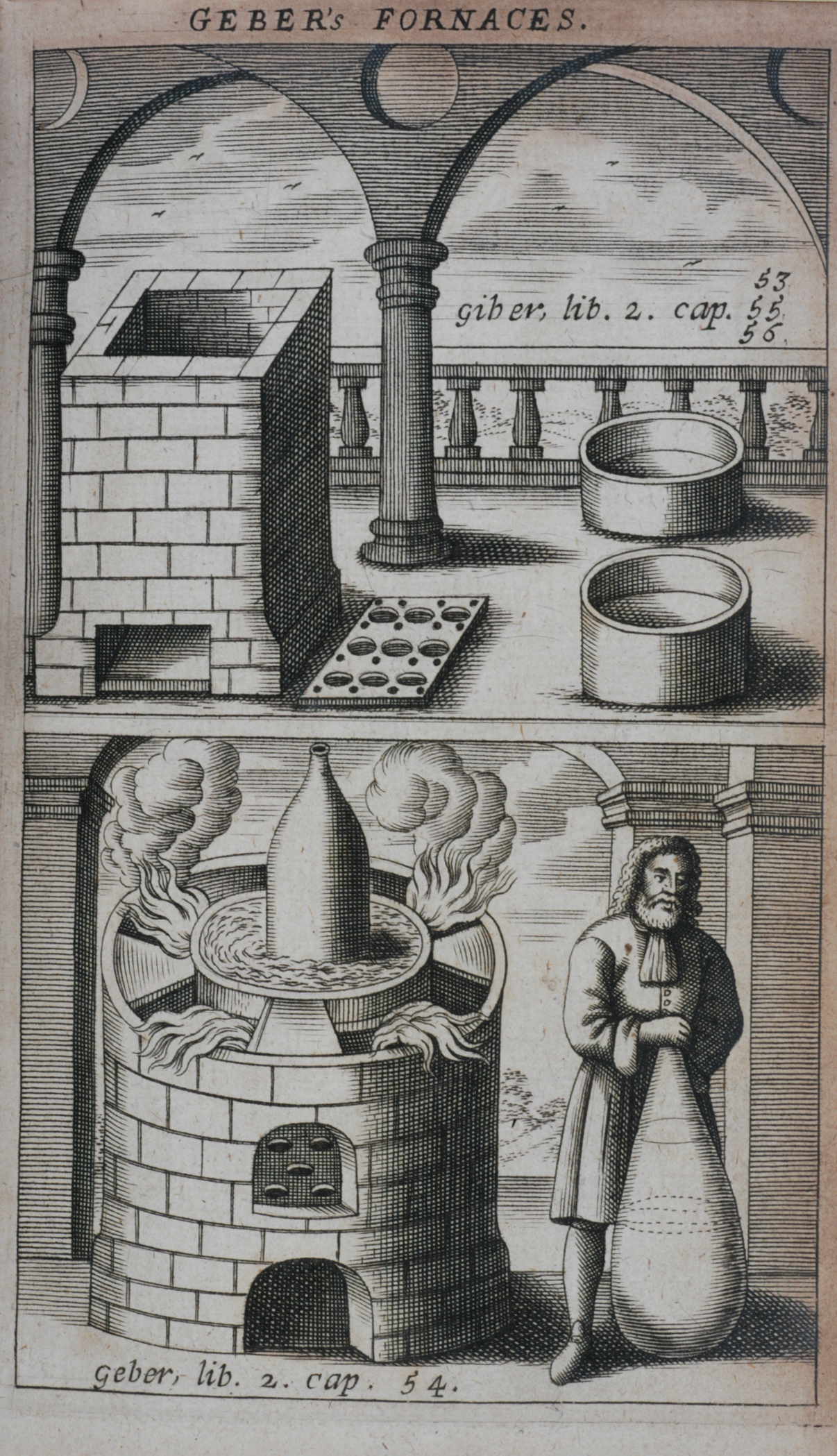
Book II, Plate III, Geber's furnaces

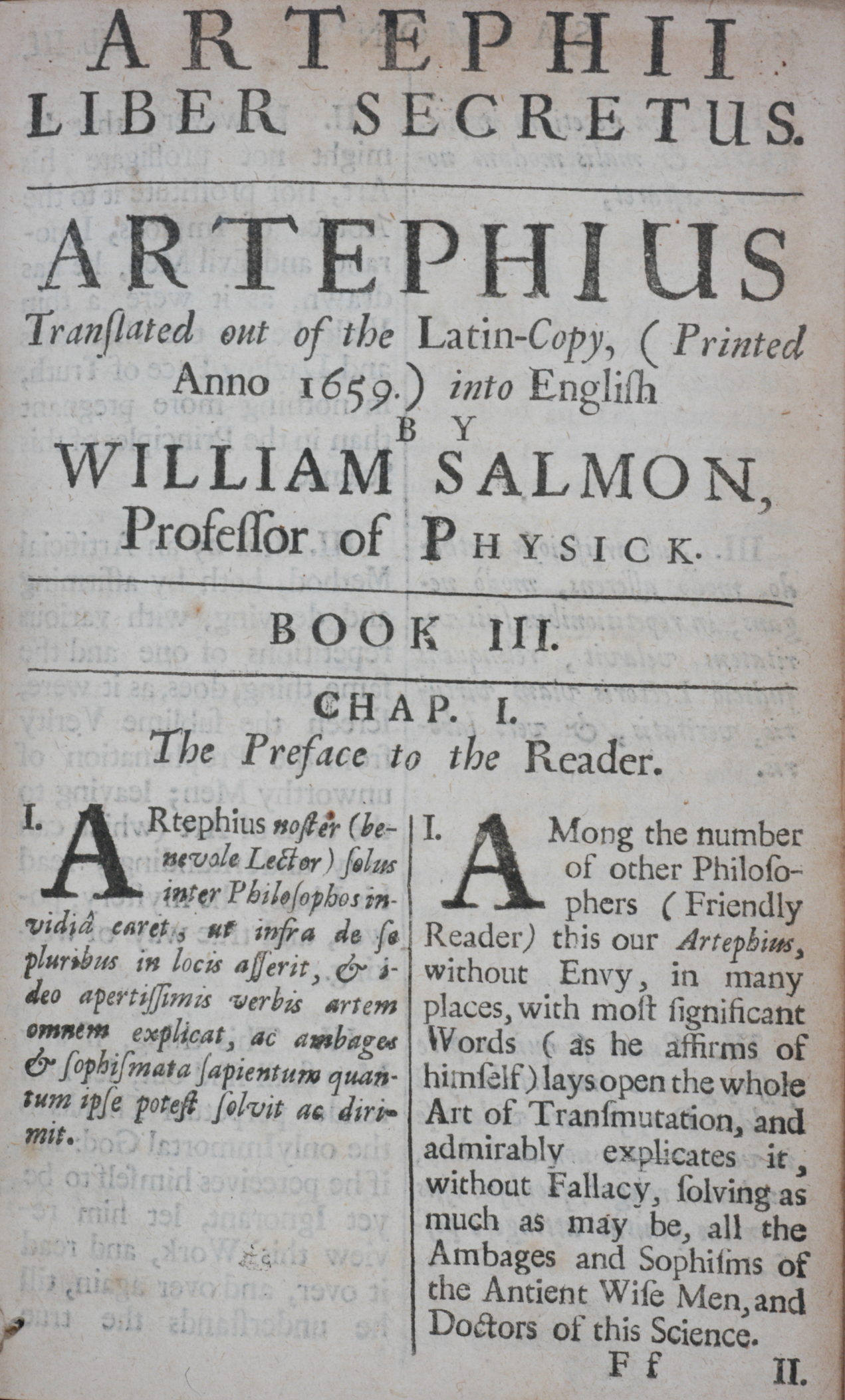
Book III, Artephius

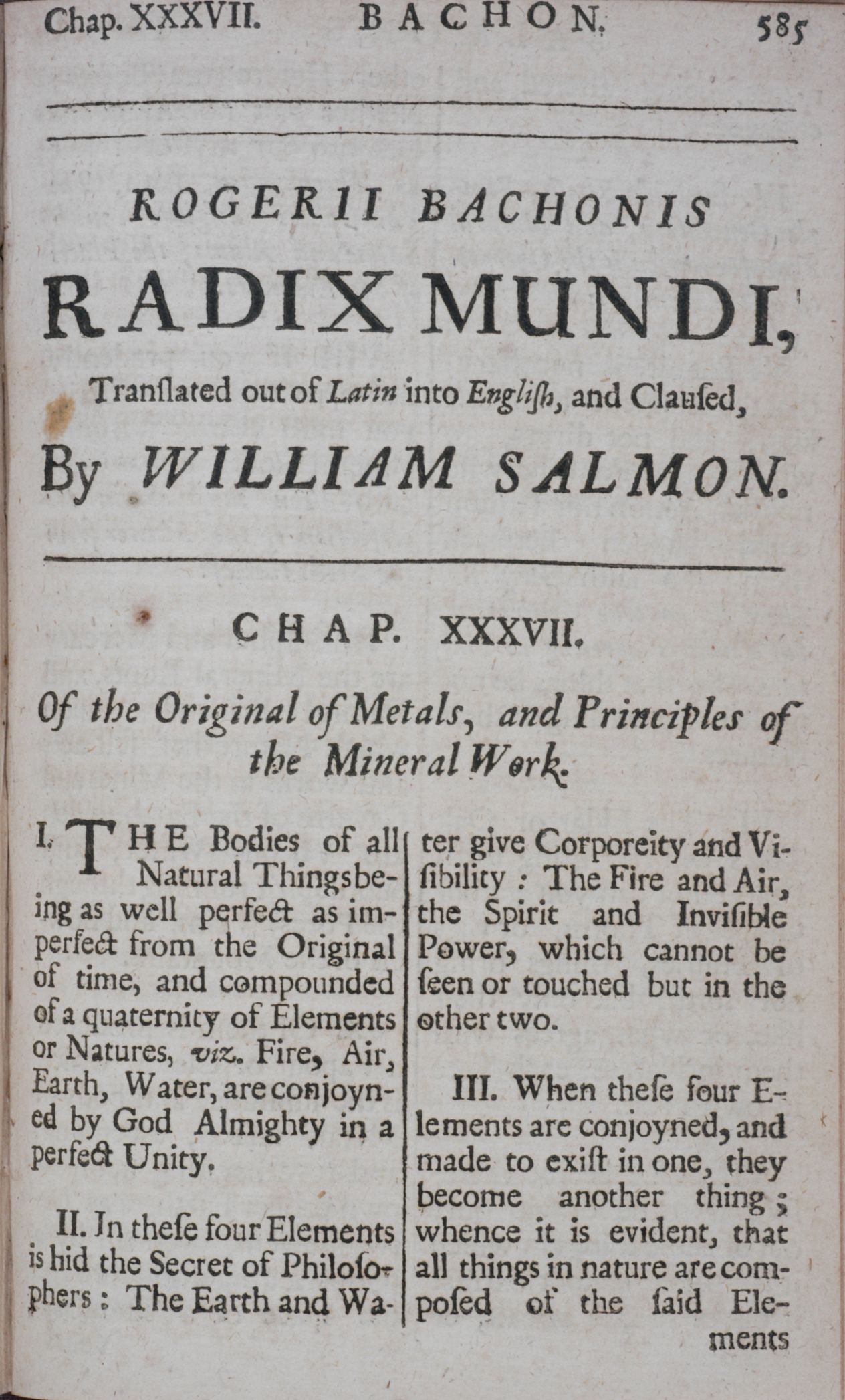
Book III, Rogerii Bachonis Radix Mundi

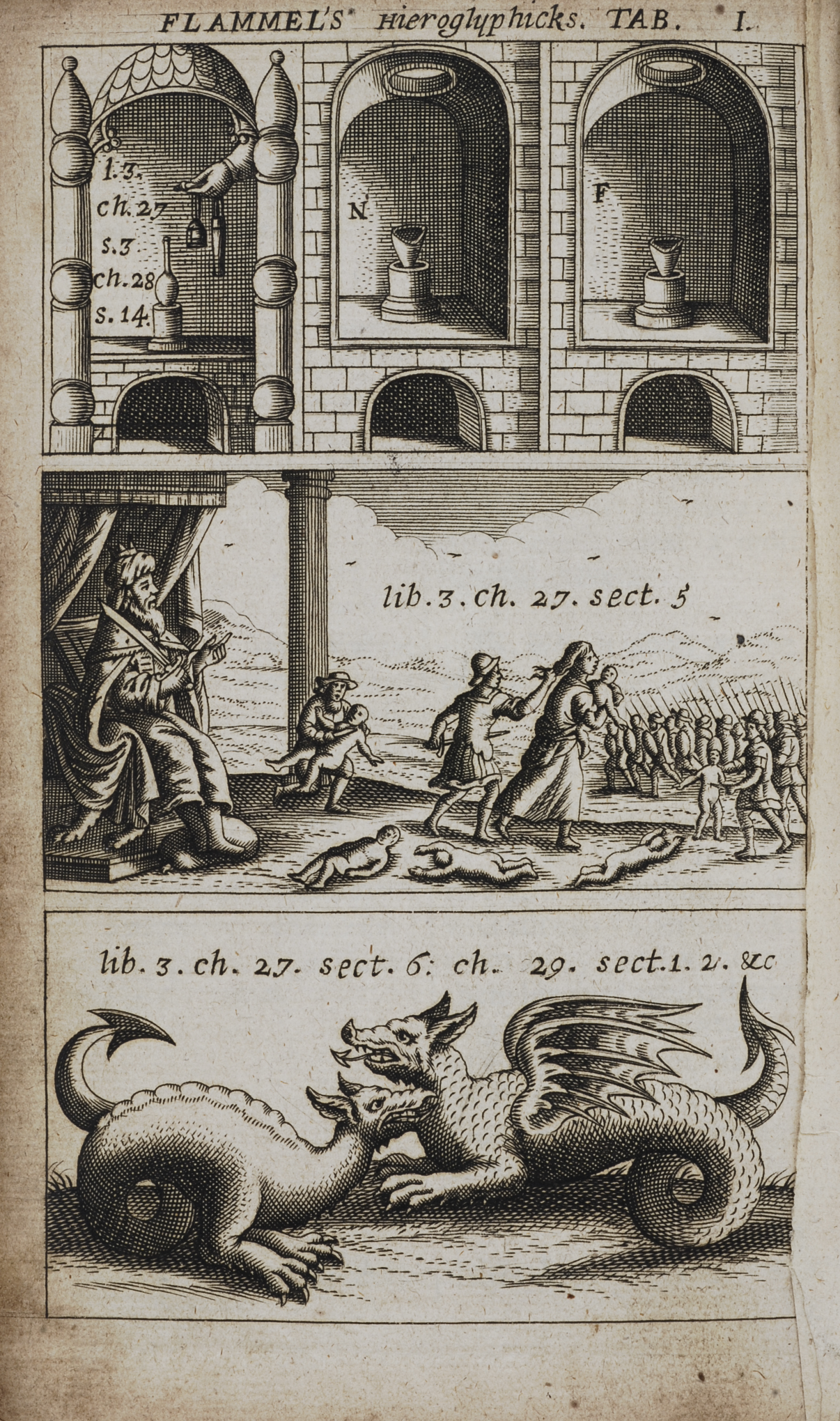
Book III, Plate I, Flammel's Hieroglyphicks

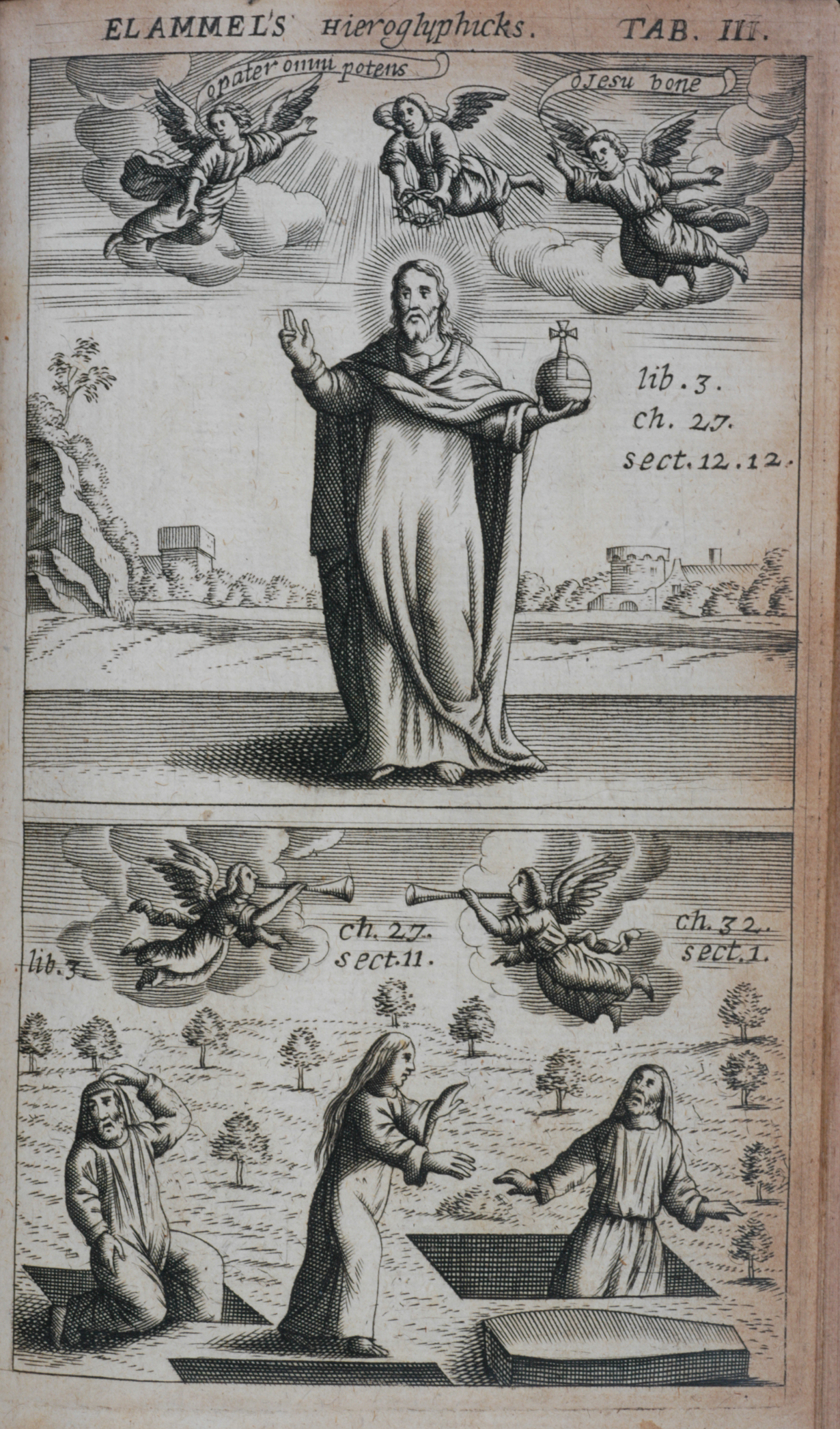
Book III, Plate III, Flammel's Hieroglyphicks

In 1693, Salmon published Seplasium. The compleat English physician : or, The druggist's shop opened.

In 1694, he published a translation of the work of court physician George Bate under the title Pharmacopoeia Bateana: Or Bate's Dispensatory. Editions appeared in 1694, 1700, 1706, and 1713.

In 1696 Salmon published The family-dictionary, or, Household companion, a work on cookery and domestic medicine. Containing recipes such as snail broth for consumption, and spiced spirits to protect the lungs, the book had been first published the year previously by "J.H." It was commended to "the use of Ladies, Gentlewomen, and other such Persons whose Station requires their taking care of a House".

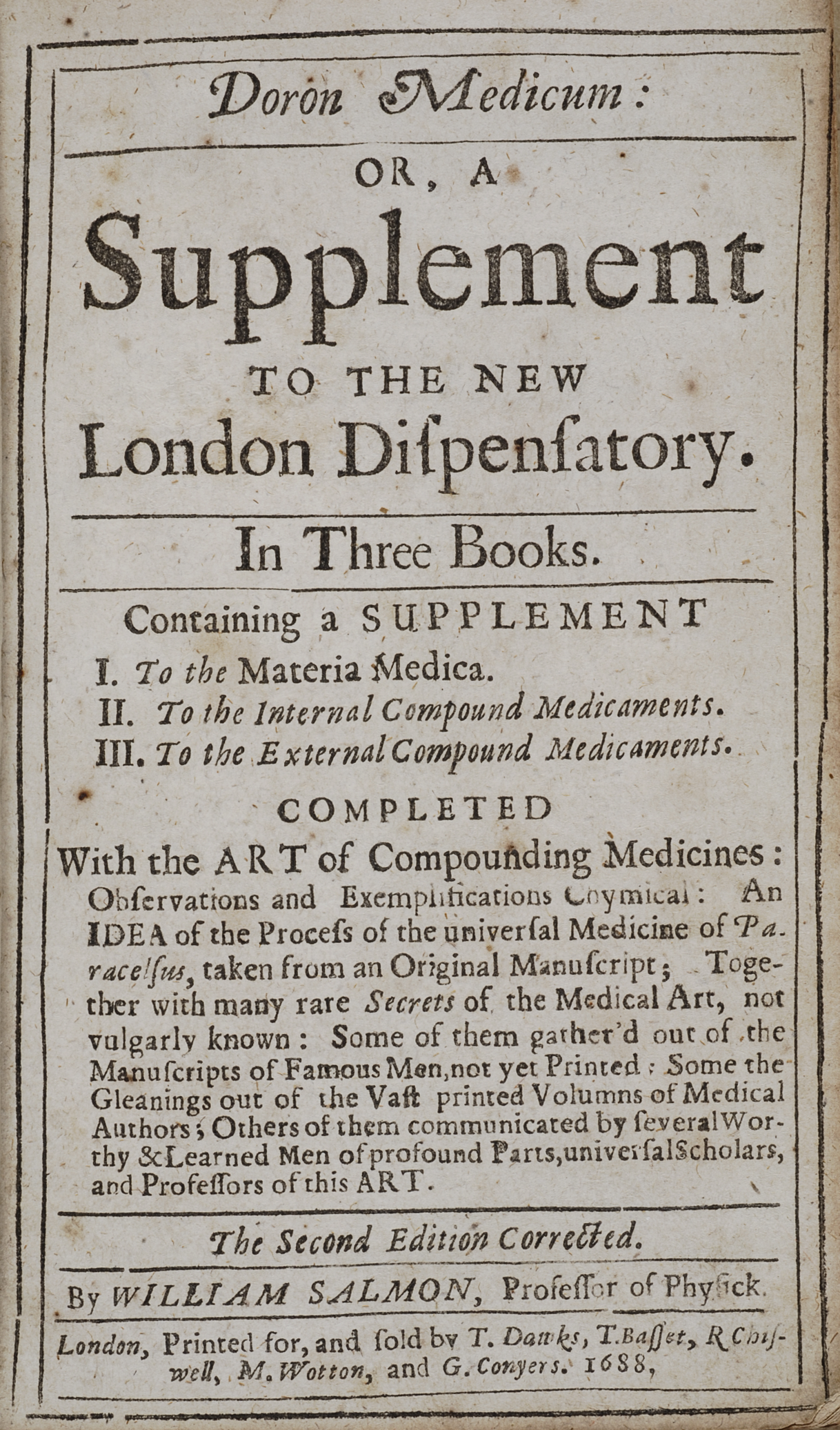
Doron medicum : or, A supplement to the New London dispensatory, 1688

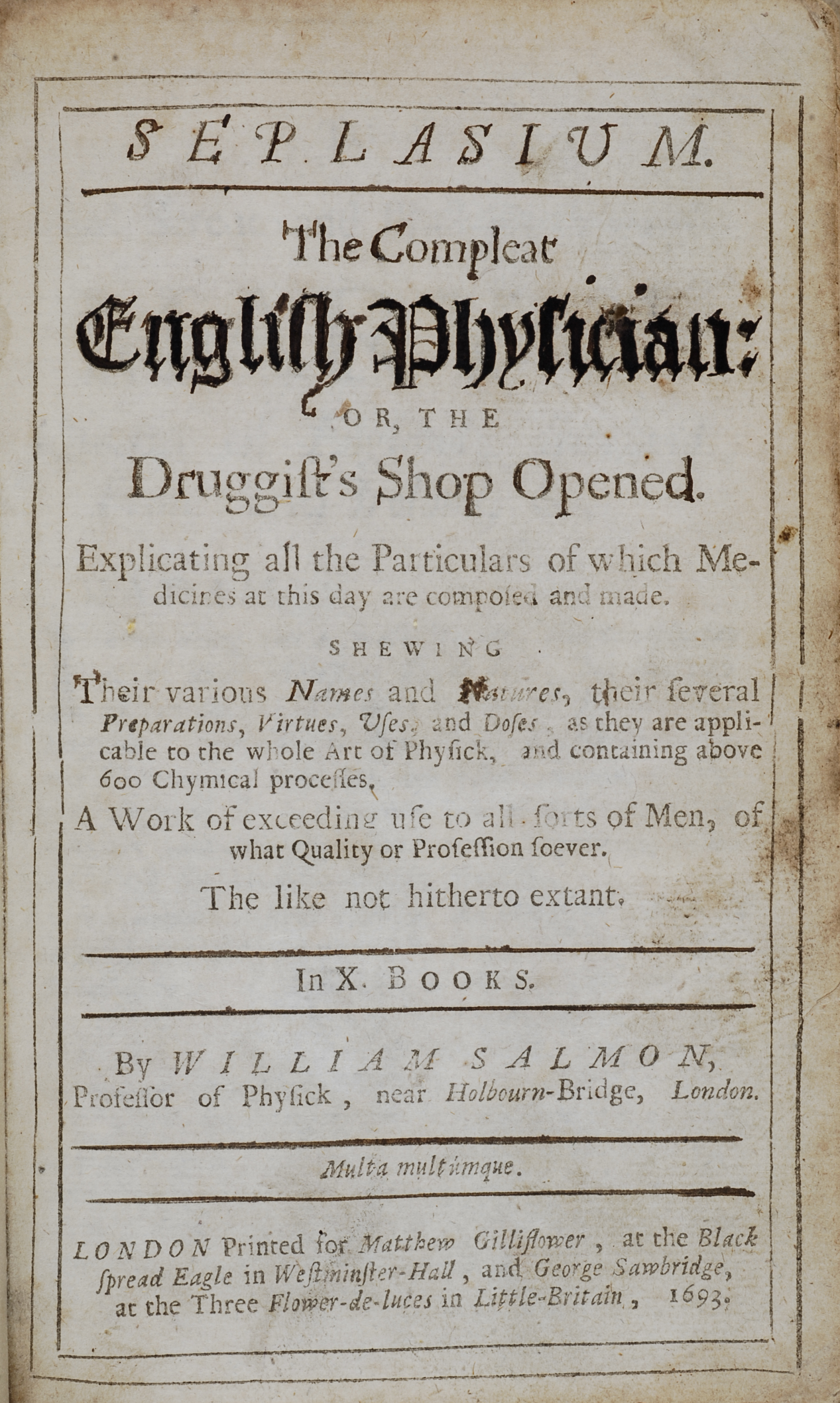
Seplasium. The compleat English physician : or, The druggist's shop opened, 1693

The family-dictionary : or, Household companion, 1705

In 1698 Salmon published a general surgical treatise, Ars chirurgica: a Compendium of the Theory and Practice of Chirurgery, and became involved in the Dispensary controversy. In the Harveian Oration of 1697, Sir Samuel Garth promoted the idea that the Royal College of Physicians should build and staff a dispensary offering free treatment to paupers. In the spring of 1698, the first of several such dispensaries was opened at Warwick Lane. This was seen as a direct challenge to the apothecaries.

Salmon published A rebuke to the authors of a blew-book call'd, The state of physick in London ... written in behalf of the apothecaries and chirurgians of the city of London (1698). James Yonge published Sidrophel Vapulans: or, The Quack-Astrologer tossed in a blanket (1699) specifically attacking Salmon. Garth himself weighed in with a mock-heroick poem, "The Dispensary" (1699), in which physicians were "on the side of charity against the intrigues of interest, and of regular learning against licentious usurpation of medical authority". Salmon is mentioned in "The Dispensary" when an apothecary is trying to get to sleep. "Cowslips and poppies o'er his eyes he spread, and S[almon]'s works he laid beneath his head."

In the preface to Collectanea Medica: The Country Physician: Or, a Choice Collection of Physick: Fitted for Vulgar Use (1703), Salmon defended himself against critical physicians:

I deem it a very great Honour done me, to be thought worthy of their Envy and Malice... I have unfolded the whole Medical Art in our English Tongue, and improved and advanced the same in all its Parts of Anatomy, Pharmacy, Chymistry, Chirurgery and Physick, beyond not only what these Warwick-Lane Fellows have done, ever since they have been a fraternity, to this day, but beyond all what ever was done before in the World by any one Man or Body of Men; As also because I have withal laid myself out in the Service of the Publick

In 1707 he published a translation from Latin into English of Dr. Thomas Sydenham's Processus Integri in Morbis Fere Omnibus Curandis under the title Praxis Medica: The Practice of Physick, crediting the original author and expanding the text.

In 1710–1711 Salmon published Botanologia; or the English Herbal (2 vols.), dedicated to Anne, Queen of Great Britain. He mentions his travels in the British colonies of North America, making the first known reference to the tomato's cultivation there, in what is now the Carolinas. He also extols the virtues of the Virginian potato. Preparations of cannabis root are suggested for the treatment of gout, arthritis, and painful joints.

Other titles by Salmon include Officina Chymica, Systema Medicinale (1686), and Phylaxa Medicinæ (1688). He has also been credited with parts of the Bibliothèque des Philosophes (1672) and the Dictionnaire Hermetique (1695).
