= Richard Boulton =

English physician and author

- Education: Brasenose College
- Years active: 1697–1724
- Medical career
- Profession: Physician

Richard Boulton (fl. 1697–1724), was a physician and author from England.

Boulton was educated at Brasenose College, Oxford, and for some time settled at Chester, was the author of a number of works on the medical and kindred sciences, including:

Reason of Muscular Motion, 1697.
Treatise concerning the Heat of the Blood, 1698.
An Examination of Mr. John Colbatche's Books, 1699. For this work on John Colbatch, Boulton was helped by Charles Goodall.
Letter to Dr. Goodal occasioned by his Letter to Dr. Leigh, 1699. The appendix to the previous work had attacked Charles Leigh of Manchester.
System of Rational and Practical Chirurgery, 1699; 2nd edition, 1713.
The Works of the Hon. Robert Boyle epitomised, 3 vols. 1699–1700.
Physico-Chirurgical Treatises of the Gout, the King's Evil, and the Lues Venerea, 1714.
Essay on External Remedies, 1715.
Essay on the Plague, 1721.
Vindication of the Compleat History of Magic, 1722. This was a defence of an earlier pot-boiler, containing a reply to the sceptical work Historical Essay Concerning Witchcraft of Francis Hutchinson on witchcraft.
Thoughts concerning the Unusual Qualities of the Air, 1724.

Boulton fell out with Goodall after the Colbatch pamphlet. Goodall attacked Boulton in a pamphlet, under his footman's name, and asked James Yonge to attack Boulton's ally William Salmon.

In a letter to Sir Hans Sloane, Boulton states that he undertook to write an abridgment of Robert Boyle's works on account of "misfortunes still attending him"; and in another letter he asks Sloane for help. In the preface to the Vindication of the History of Magic he states that he had been for some time out of England.
