= Richard Bolton =

Richard Bolton may refer to:

- Richard Bolton (lawyer) (1570–1648), English lawyer in Ireland
- Richard Bolton (rugby league) (1943–2024), New Zealand rugby league footballer

== See also ==
- Richard Scrope, 1st Baron Scrope of Bolton (c.1327–1403), English soldier and courtier
- Richard Boulton (fl.1697–1724), English medical and science writer
