= William Cole (physician) =

English physician (1635–1716)

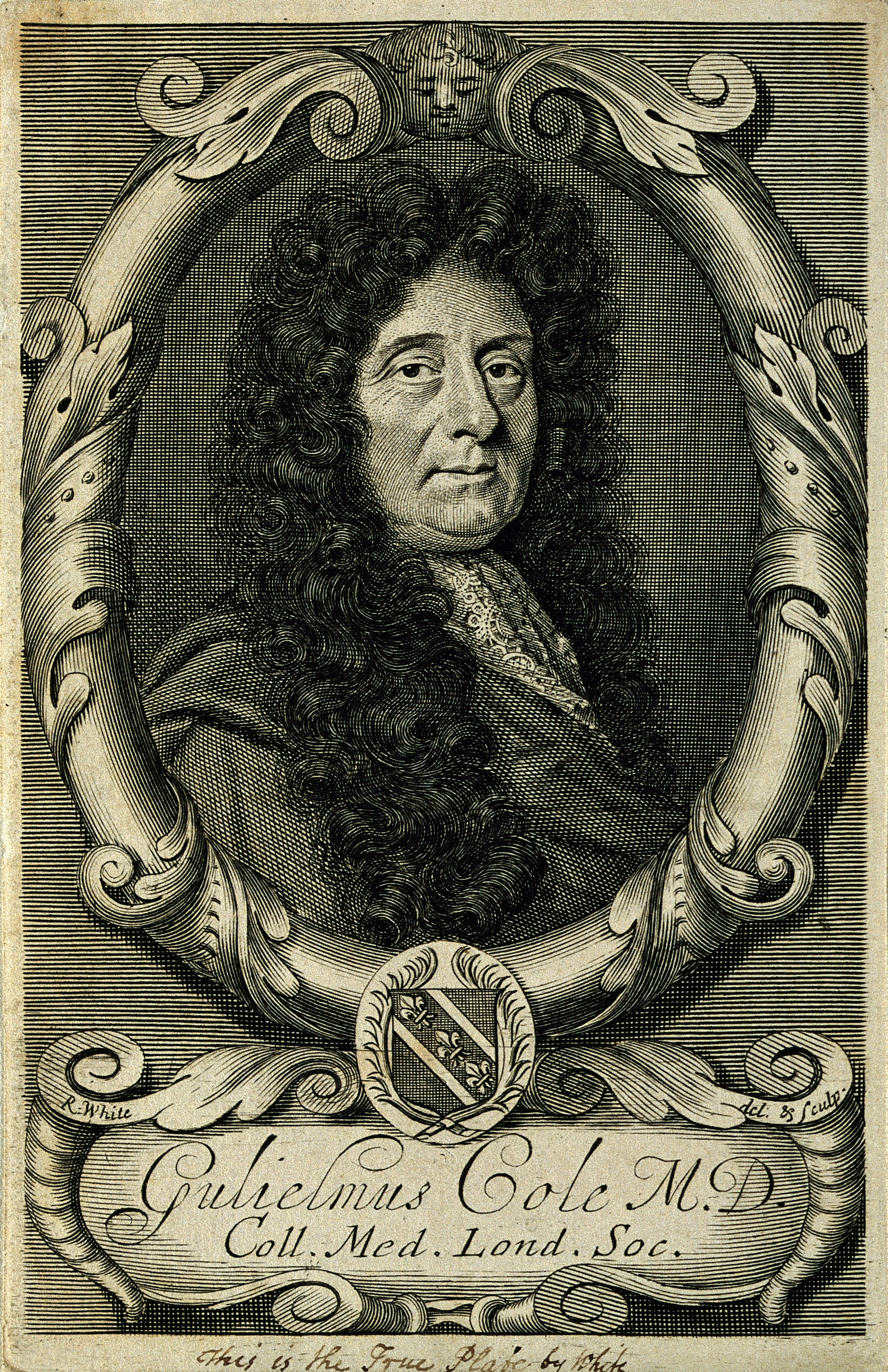
Line engraving by Robert White (c. 1690)

William Cole, FRCP (1635 – 1716) was an English physician and medical writer.

== Life ==
William Cole, born in 1635, was educated at Gloucester Hall, Oxford, as a member of which society he graduated MB on 7 August 1660, and MD on 9 July 1666. He practised first at Worcester, where, as appears from his writings, he was consulted by persons of distinction, and was probably successful. From Worcester he wrote in 1681 to Sydenham (though personally unknown to him) the letter which called forth the latter's well-known Dissertatio Epistolaris. The personal reference to Cole in this work shows that he was already well known by his medical writings. About 1692 he removed to London, and was admitted 26 June 1693 a candidate, and 25 June 1694 a fellow of the College of Physicians. Some time before his death he appears to have retired to the country. He died on 12 June 1716, and was buried at Allesley, near Coventry, where his grave with memorial inscription still exists. His portrait, drawn and engraved by Robert White, adorns some of his books.

== Legacy ==
Cole enjoyed in his day great repute as a medical writer, his works being several times reprinted on the continent. Sydenham speaks of him with respect. Haller calls him iatromathematicus et hypothesium inventor, and by his writings Cole belongs unmistakably to the mechanical school of medicine, though he did not meddle with mathematics. But he early recognised the practical superiority of Sydenham's more natural method, and readily adopted that great physician's treatment for the small-pox. His first work, De Secretione Animali, is chiefly physiological, giving an explanation of secretion on mechanical principles, but it is entirely deductive or conjectural, not experimental. His New Hypothesis of Fevers is very wild in the theoretical part, but in the practical advocates the use of Peruvian bark. In his work on apoplexies he attributes much to the effect of cold, and dates the supposed frequency of such attacks from the severe winter of 1683. This is the only work Cole wrote in English, and among other excuses for using the vernacular he modestly pleads his deficiency in the learned languages, as shown in his former works. His last tract on a case of epilepsy was written in answer to Dr. Thomas Hobart of Cambridge, who, after the fashion of the day, asked his advice in a Latin letter.

== Works ==
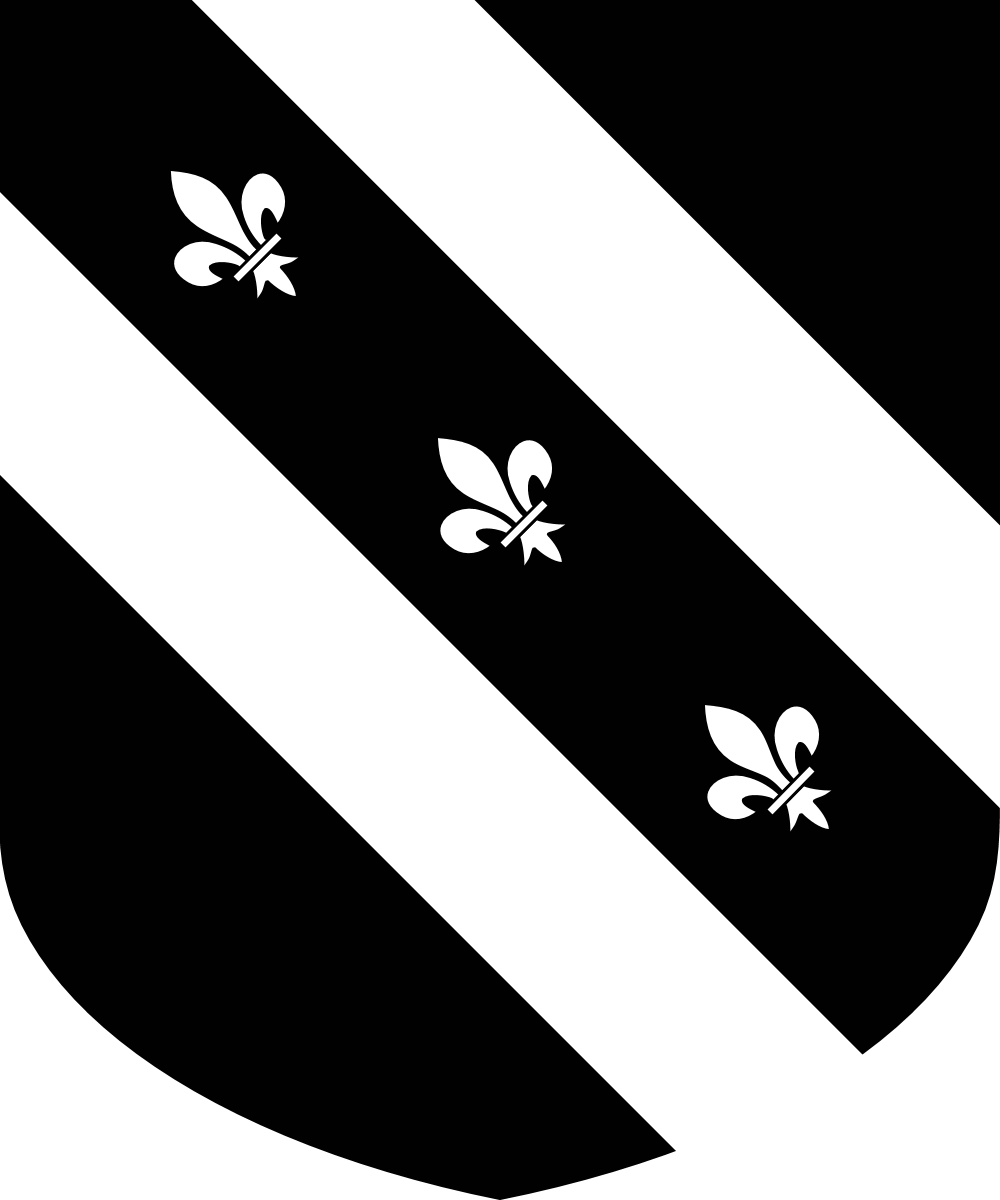
1. Coat of arms shown in the engraving above
  De Secretione Animali cogitata, Oxford, 1674, 12mo; The Hague, 1681, 12mo (Haller); (with Richard Morton's works), Geneva, 1696 and 1727, 4to; Lyons, 1737, 4to.
2. Novæ Hypotheseos ad explicanda Febrium Intermittentium Symptomata Hypotyposis, London, 1694, 8vo; Amsterdam, 1698, 8vo; (with Morton's works), Geneva, 1696 and 1727, 4to; Lyons, 1737, 4to.
3. Physico-medical Essay concerning the late Frequency of Apoplexies, Oxford, 1689.
4. Consilium Ætiologicum de Casu quodam Epileptico; annexâ Disquisitione de Perspiratione Insensibili, London, 1702, 8vo (portrait).
5. Medical cases in Philosophical Transactions of the Royal Society, vol. xv. 1685: De falsa graviditate, p. 1045; De prænobili femina apoplexia perempta (Lady Pakington), p. 1068; Historiæ convulsionum, pp. 1113–15; Letter on stones voided per penem, p. 1162.

== Sources ==
- Payne, Joseph Frank (1887). "Cole, William (1635-1716)" . In Stephen, Leslie (ed.). Dictionary of National Biography. Vol. 11. London: Smith, Elder & Co. pp. 277–278.
