= John Browne (anatomist) =

English anatomist, surgeon, and author

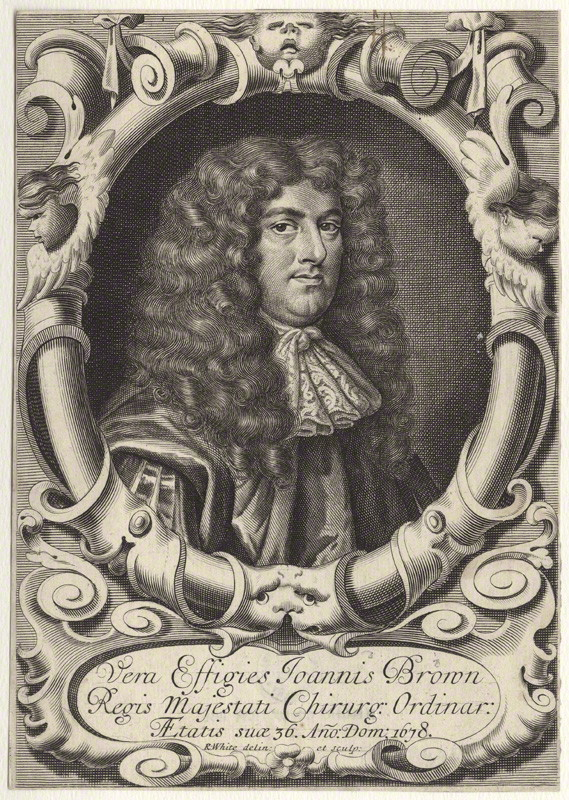
- John Browne
- Born: 1642; Norwich
- Died: 1702 (aged 59–60)
- Known for: Scientific misconduct
- Scientific career
- Fields: anatomy
- Workplaces: St Thomas Hospital

John Browne (1642–1702) was an English anatomist, surgeon and writer. He published the first description of cirrhosis of the liver in 1685 and the first description of necrotising pancreatitis in 1684. He was also known for publishing the work of others under his name.

== Life ==
Browne was brought up in Norwich, in a surgical family, being related to William Crop, a surgeon in Norfolk, but not closely related to Sir Thomas Browne whom he knew. He studied at St. Thomas's Hospital, London, under Thomas Hollyer, served as a naval surgeon, and then practised in Norwich.

In 1678 Browne moved to London, and about the same time was made surgeon in ordinary to King Charles II. With the king's recommendation he became surgeon at St. Thomas's Hospital, on 21 June 1683, chosen over Edward Rice who had taken charge of the hospital during the Great Plague of 1665, when other surgeons deserted their posts.

In 1691 complaints arose that the surgeons did not obey the regulations of the hospital, and claimed that being appointed by royal mandamus they were not responsible to the governors. The Whig Sir Robert Clayton was then President, the governors were determined to maintain their authority, and on 7 July 1691 they dismissed the whole of their surgical staff, including Browne, and appointed others. Browne appealed to the lords commissioners of the great seal, and the governors were called upon to defend their proceedings.

Browne was also surgeon to William III. In 1698 he petitioned the governors to be reinstated, though without success.

== Works ==
Browne wrote:

- A Treatise of Preternatural Tumours, London, 1678 (with plates).
- A Complete Discourse of Wounds, London, 1678 (with plates).
- Adeno-Choiradelogia, or an Anatomick-Chirurgical Treatise, London, 1684, in three parts:
1. Adenographia, or an Anatomical Treatise of the Glandules;
2. Chreradelogia, or an exact Discourse of Strumaes or King's Evil Swellings;
3. Charisma Basilicon, or the Royal Gift of Healing Strumaes, &c., by Contact or Imposition of the Sacred Hands of our Kings of England and of France. It describes the method pursued by Charles II in touching for the "king's evil", with which as the king's surgeon Browne was officially concerned. It gives statistics for the numbers of persons touched (between 1660 and 1682, reckoned as 92,107).
- Myographia Nova, or a graphical description of all the Muscles in the Human Body; with one and forty copper-plates, London, 1684; 2nd ed. Lugd. Batavorum, 1687; 3rd ed. London, 1697; 4th ed. London, 1698. This treatise on the muscles consists of six lectures, illustrated by copper-plates. It was, however, plagiarised, as was pointed out by James Yonge: it put together text from the Muskotomia of William Molins with illustrations from the Tabula anatomicae of Giulio Casserius. Nevertheless, Browne's book was popular, and appeared in ten editions.
- The Surgeon's Assistant, London, 1703.

== Notes ==
Attribution

This article incorporates text from a publication now in the public domain: Stephen, Leslie, ed. (1886). "Browne, John (1642-1700?)". Dictionary of National Biography. Vol. 7. London: Smith, Elder & Co.
