= Thomas Emes =

Thomas Emes (died 1707), known as "the prophet", was a quack doctor and millenarian who practiced as a surgeon among the poorer classes of England.

In the hope of obtaining notoriety he allied himself with the Camisards. He died at Old Street Square, London, 22 December 1707, and was buried on Christmas Day in Bunhill Fields.

== Resurrection prophesy ==
"Under the operation of the Spirit" his brethren were enabled to prophesy that he would rise from his grave between twelve at noon and six in the evening of 25 May 1708. No clothing was to be provided, for rising "pure and innocent", it would not, they declared, "be esteem'd indecency for him to walk naked unto his habitation".

Three days before the pretended resurrection the government, fearing disturbances, and to prevent any tricks being played, placed guards at the grave and about the cemetery.

== Works ==
- A Dialogue between Alkali and Acid … wherein a late pretended new hypothesis, asserting Alkali the cause, and Acid the cure of all diseases, is proved groundless and dangerous. Being a specimen of the immodest self-applause, shameful contempt, and abuse of all physicians, gross mistakes and great ignorance of the pretender John Colbatch.
- A Letter to a Gentleman concerning Alkali and Acid. Being an answer to a late piece, intituled A Letter to a Physician concerning Acid and Alkali. To which is added, a Specimen of a new Hypothesis, for the sake of Lovers of Medicine, 1700
- The Atheist turn'd Deist, and the Deist turn'd Christian: or, the Reasonableness and Union of Natural and the True Christian Religion, London, 1698.
