= Charles Leigh (physician) =

English physician and naturalist

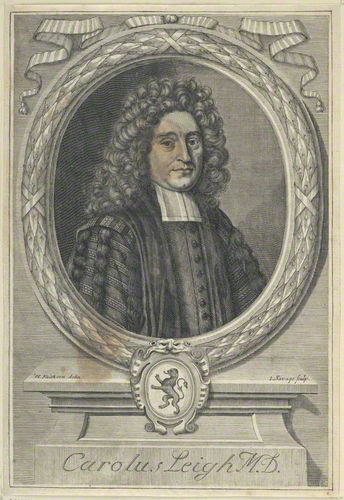
- Charles Leigh, 1700 engraving by John Savage.
- Born: 1662; Singleton Grange
- Died: 1701?
- Occupation: Naturalist
- Known for: Fellow of the Royal Society

Charles Leigh (1662–1701?) was an English physician and naturalist.

== Life ==
The son of William Leigh of Singleton-in-the-Fylde, Lancashire, and great-grandson of William Leigh, was born at Singleton Grange in 1662. On 7 July 1679 he became a commoner of Brasenose College, Oxford, where he graduated B.A. on 24 May 1683. Anthony Wood recorded that he left Oxford in debt; he went to Jesus College, Cambridge, and graduated M.A. and M.D. (1689) there.

Leigh was on 13 May 1685 elected a Fellow of the Royal Society. When Wood wrote his Athenæ Oxonienses, Leigh was practising in London; but he lived at Manchester at a later date, and had an extensive practice in Lancashire. He is said to have died in 1701, but there is some doubt on this point.

== Works ==
Some of Leigh's papers read before the Royal Society are printed in the Philosophical Transactions, and he published the following separate works:

- Phthisologia Lancastriensis, cui accessit Tentamen Philosophicum de Mineralibus Aquis in eodem comitatu observatis, 1694; reprinted at Geneva, 1736.
- Exercitationes quinque, de Aquis Mineralibus; Thermis Calidis; Morbis Acutis; Morbis Intermittentib.; Hydrope, 1697.
- The Natural History of Lancashire, Cheshire, and the Peak in Derbyshire; with an account of the British, Phœnic, Armenian, Gr. and Rom. Antiquities found in those parts, Oxford, 1700. This has a portrait after Faithorne as frontispiece.

He also wrote three pamphlets in 1698 in answer to Richard Boulton on the Heat of the Blood, and one in reply to John Colebatch on curing the bite of a viper. His Natural History is little more than a translation of his earlier Latin treatises. Thomas Dunham Whitaker later wrote slightingly of Leigh's "want of literature".

== Family ==
Leigh married Dorothy, daughter of Edward Shuttleworth of Larbrick, Lancashire, with whom he received a moiety of the manor of Larbrick, afterwards surrendered in payment of a debt owing by Leigh to Serjeant Reginald Bretland. He left no issue. His widow died before 1717.
