= John Colbatch (apothecary) =

English apothecary and physician

Sir John Colbatch
- Born: 1 August 1666; Worcester, England
- Died: 15 January 1729 (aged 62)
- Education: Royal College of Physicians
- Medical career
- Field: Apothecary and physician
- Institutions: Charitable Society for relieving the Sick, Poor and Needy (later Westminster Hospital)
- Sub-specialties: Metabolic acidosis and alkalosis
- Research: "Vulnerary Powder"

Sir John Colbatch (baptised 1 August 1666 – 1729) was an English apothecary and physician. Beginning as an apprentice, rising through freeman to master apothecary in the Worcester Mercer's Company, he went to London in the early 1690s.

== Life ==
Bringing proof of his disfranchisement, dated 23 May 1696, he was examined, and admitted as a licentiate of the Royal College of Physicians on 22 December 1696. He was knighted by George I on 5 June 1716, and died at an advanced age 15 January 1729, leaving his estate to his wife, Elizabeth.

Colbatch offered his services to the "Charitable Society for relieving the Sick, Poor and Needy" in early 1716, which went on to found Westminster Hospital.

Colbatch became famous in London for his medicines: a "Vulnerary Powder", with the power to stop bleeding without application of a tourniquet, and "Tincture of the Sulphur of Venus", which speeded healing. While apparently initially successful on a trial involving a dog, the powder caused severe burns without slowing the bleeding when applied to humans. Colbatch's detractors claimed this was due to the powder's caustic nature, while Colbatch claimed it was due to improper application of the medicine to the wounds.

Colbatch resisted the common view that medicines were so-called "alkalies" which countered "acidic" diseases, instead claiming that disease was "alkaline", best treated by "acids". This became a vicious "pamphlet war" between Colbatch and his supporters (Edward Baynard and William Cole) against William Coward, Thomas Emes and others over the acidity or alkalinity of his cures, and over whether the diseases themselves were acid or alkaline. This public disagreement in turn spawned a spate of satires concerning the so-called "Acidists and Alkalists".

Colbatch was a voluminous writer, but his works were not always considered to be of the highest class, as evidenced by the following verse, which compares Colbatch to Thomas Saffold, who was mocked by literary enthusiasts for his short, rhyming advertisements.

When the enervate aim
Beyond their force, they still contend for shame;
Had Colbatch printed nothing of his own
He had not been the Saffold o' the town;
Asses and owls, unseen, their kind betray
If these attempt to hoot, or those to bray.

— Samuel Garth, The Dispensary, Canto I.

== Works ==
- The Doctrine of Acids in the Cure of Diseases. 12mo. Lond. 1689.
- The New Light of Chirurgery. 12mo. Lond. 1695.
- Physico-Medical Essays concerning Alkali and Acid in the case of Distempers. 8vo. Lond. 1696.
- On the Causes, Nature, and Cure of Gout. 8vo. Lond. 1697.
- Extraordinary Cure of the Bite of a Viper by Acids. 8vo. Lond. 1698.
- A Collection of Tracts Chirurgical and Medical. 8vo. Lond. 1700.
- A Scheme for Proper Methods to be taken should it please God to visit us with the Plague. 8vo. Lond. 1721.
- Observations on the Scheme lately published. 8vo. Lond. 1721.
- A Dissertation concerning Mistletoe, a remedy in Convulsive Distempers. 8vo. Lond. 3rd Edition, 1723.
- Colbatch’s Legacy; or, the Family Physician. 8vo. Lond. 1733.
