= Basilicon =

Various ointments

Basilicon, or basilicum, is the name given to various ointments that were believed to have 'sovereign' virtues. One such example was an unguent composed of rosin, wax, pitch, and oil, which pre-modern surgeons used as a suppurative.

The German physician Wilhelm Fabry described the use of basilicon ointments in the treatment of burns. English physicians in the early nineteenth century reported their use in the prevention of gangrene.

== See also ==
- Balm
- Bezoar
