= Carlo Ruini =

Italian anatomist (1530–1598)

From Carlo Ruini's Anatomia del Cavallo (Venice, 1618)

Carlo Ruini (1530–1598) was one of the most noted anatomists of the horse of the 16th century.

He was born into a wealthy family in Bologna, Italy, and was privately educated in the style of most upper class children. He did not receive special training as a physician or attend the famous university in Bologna. It is unknown if he received special training in art. He appears to have been an avid collector of horses and a rider. His noted work, Anatomia del Cavallo, appeared two months after his death in 1598 and was a milestone in equine veterinary publishing. It is especially known for its well drafted woodcut images of horse anatomy which were heavily influenced by human anatomical works published in the decades before, especially Andreas Vesalius' De Fabrica Corporis Humani (Basel, 1543). It was also the first (comprehensive) work or "monograph", as it is known, on the anatomy of any animal. Numerous editions of the work were published, and its images and text were often plagiarized, including the many errors found in the first edition.

Ruini was married to Vittoria Pepoli. In 1598, he was assassinated due to his involvement in politics.

== Sources ==
- Adapted from public domain text at Carlo Ruini Biography. Historical Anatomies on the Web. US National Library of Medicine.
