= Giulio Cesare Casseri =

Italian anatomist (1552–1616)

Doctor Giulio Cesare Casseri
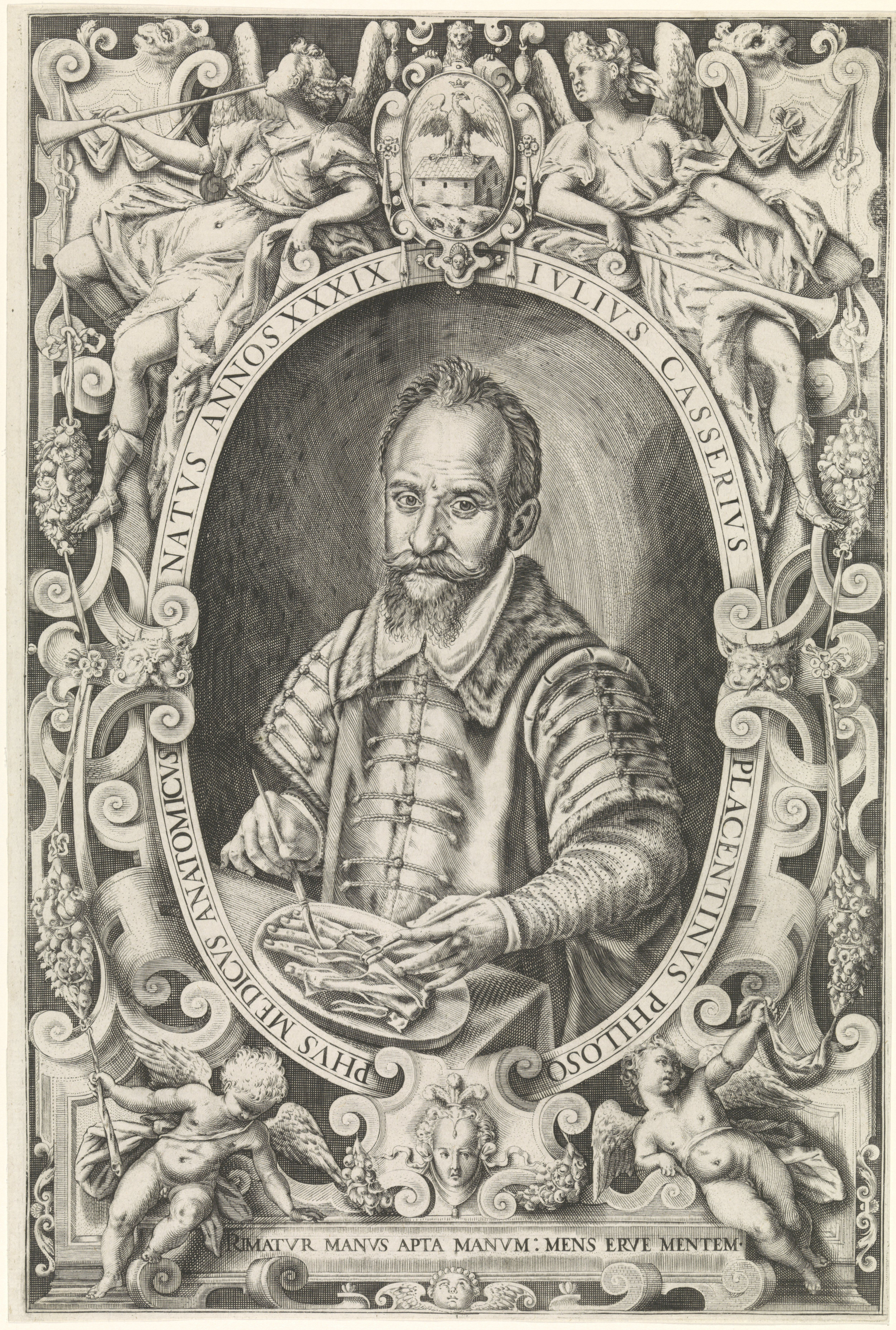
- Casseri in 1591
- Born: 1552; Piacenza, Duchy of Parma and Piacenza
- Died: 8 March 1616 (aged 63–64); Padua, Republic of Venice
- Resting place: Church of the Eremitani
- Education: University of Padua
- Known for: Tabulae anatomicae, probably the most important anatomical treatise in the seventeenth century
- Scientific career
- Fields: Anatomy; Neurology; Comparative anatomy
- Workplaces: University of Padua

Giulio Cesare Casseri (1552 – 8 March 1616), also written as Giulio Casser, Giulio Casserio of Piacenza or Latinized as Iulius Casserius Placentinus, Giulio Casserio, was an Italian anatomist. He is best known for the books Tabulae anatomicae (1627) and De Vocis Auditusque Organis (c. 1600). He was the first to describe the Circle of Willis.

== Biography ==
Born in Piacenza, Casseri moved to Padua as a young man, where he became an assistant to anatomist Hieronymus Fabricius. He studied at the School of Medicine of the University, where his teachers included Girolamo Mercuriale, who was Chair of Clinical Medicine in Padua from 1580-87. Casseri fell out with Fabricius, initially it seems as Fabricius resented the enthusiasm of the students for Casseri's teaching when Fabricius was ill.

He wrote Tabulae anatomicae, probably the most important anatomical treatise in the seventeenth century, published in Venice, in 1627. The book contained 97 copper-engraved pictures, by Francesco Valesio, inspired by Odoardo Fialetti, Italian painter and former student at Titian's school. The pictures in this book were copied in the works of his successor at Padua, Adriaan van den Spiegel (1578–1625). His De vocis auditusque organis historia anatomica was published in 1600-1 in Ferrara. In this work, he was the first to illustrate the use of tymbals in the production of sound by cicadas. He died in Padua.

The historian of comparative anatomy, F. J. Cole considered Casserius as one of the oldest exponents of comparative anatomy by examining and illustrating anatomical analogues of man in other animals. He described the arterial circle of the brain 37 years before the work of Thomas Willis after whom is named the Circle of Willis.

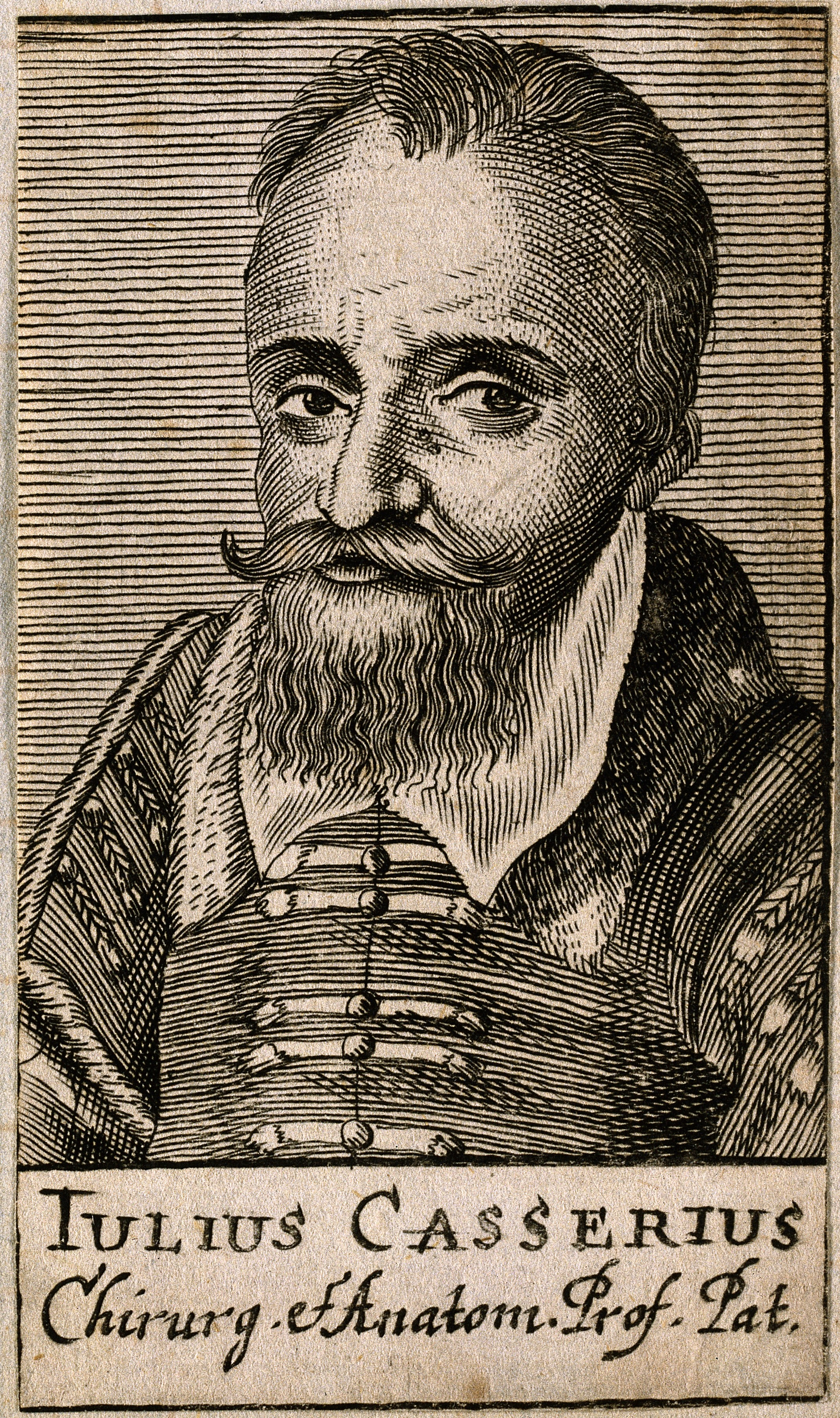
Casserius

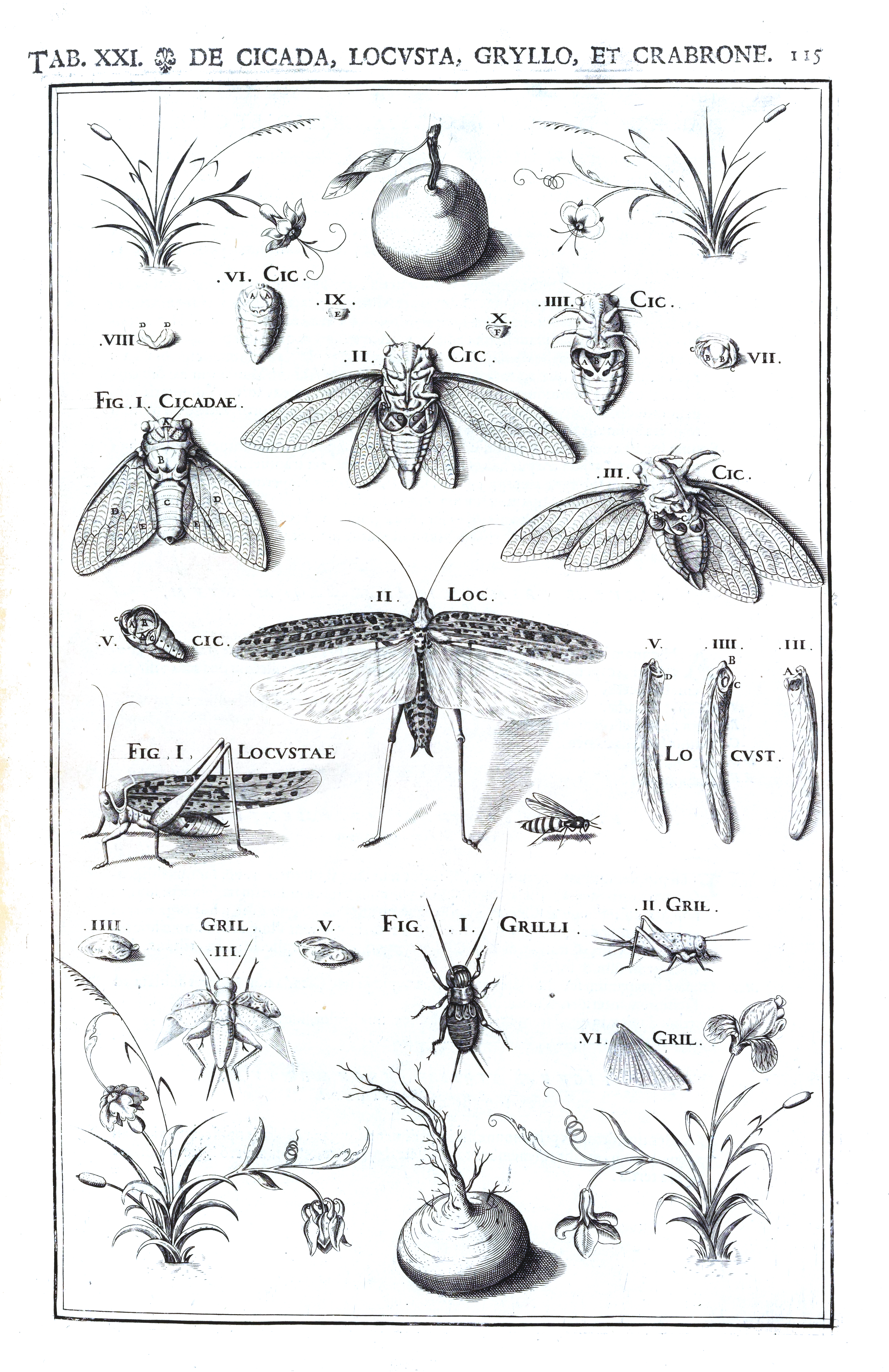
Casseri's illustration of insect sound production

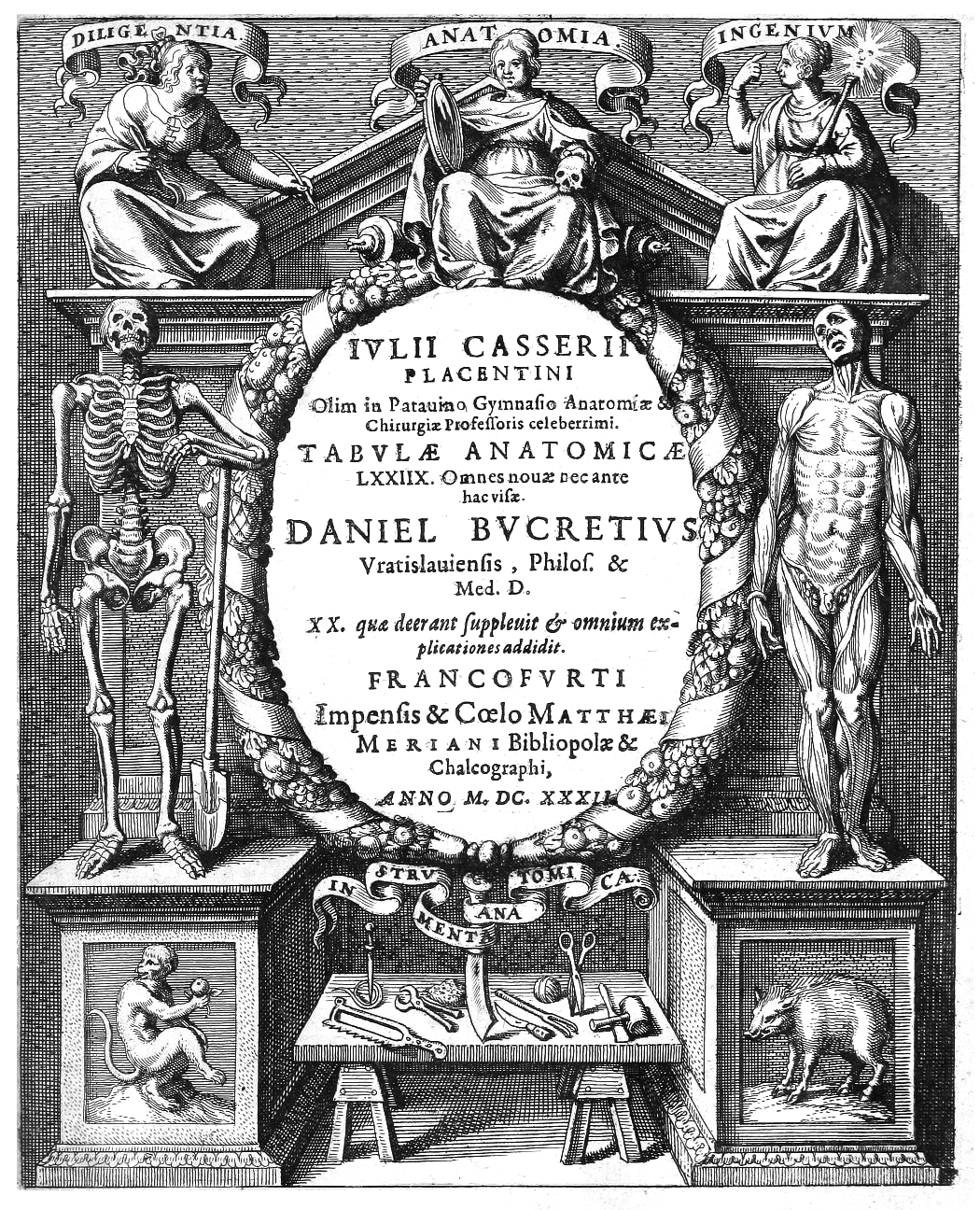
Title page of Tabulae anatomicae (1632)

== Related eponyms ==
- Casser fontanelle (mastoid fontanelle)
- Casser perforated muscle (coracobrachialis muscle)

== Other sources ==
- Riva, A.; Orrù, B.; Pirino, A.; Riva, F. T. (2001). "Iulius Casserius (1552–1616): The self-made anatomist of Padua's golden age". The Anatomical Record. 265 (4): 168–175. doi:10.1002/ar.1151. PMID 11519018. S2CID 33699726.
- Bourgery, J. M. & Jacob, N. H.: Atlas of Human Anatomy and Surgery; Paris, 2005
- Housman, Brian, Bellary, Sharath, Hansra, Simrat, Mortazavi, Martin, Tubbs, R. Shane & Marios Loukas Giulio Cesare Casseri (c. 1552–1616): The servant who became an anatomist. Clinical Anatomy, 2014, Vol.27(5), pp. 675–680
- Weir, Neil, Otolaryngology : an illustrated history. Butterworths, London, 1990.
- De Ferrari, Augusto (1978). "CASSERI, Giulio Cesare". Dizionario Biografico degli Italiani (in Italian). Vol. 21: Caruso–Castelnuovo. Rome: Istituto dell'Enciclopedia Italiana. ISBN 978-88-12-00032-6.
