= Pressed Steel Company =

British car body manufacturer active since 2021

Pressed Steel Company Limited
- Logo from 1965
- Industry: Car body manufacturing
- Founded: 1926; 100 years ago in Cowley, Oxfordshire, England
- Founder: William Morris, Budd Corporation
- Fate: Merged into Pressed Steel Fisher in 1965

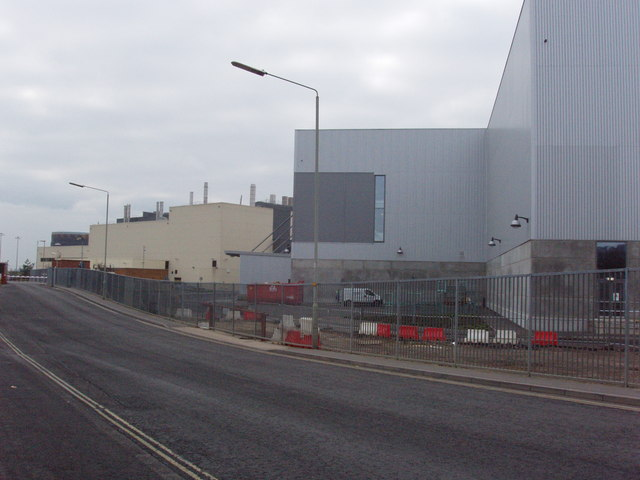
South-east facing side of Pressed Steel's Cowley site in January 2007 now home of MINI Plant Oxford

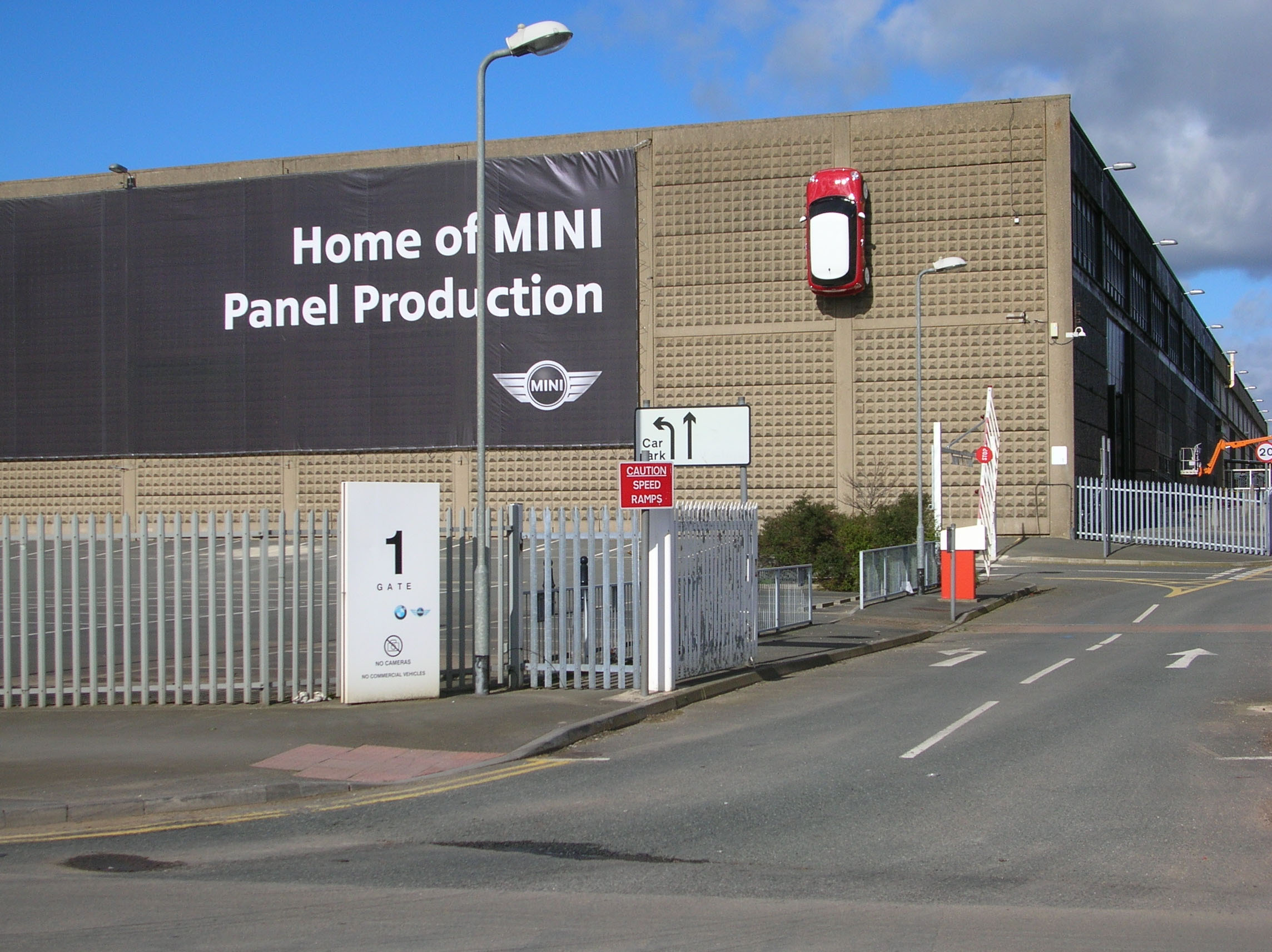
Swindon Pressings plant, Swindon

Pressed Steel Company Limited was a British car body manufacturing business founded in Cowley near Oxford in 1926 as a joint venture between William Morris, Budd Corporation of Philadelphia USA, which held the controlling interest, and a British / American bank J. Henry Schroder & Co. At that time the company was named The Pressed Steel Company of Great Britain Limited. It acquired Budd's patent rights and processes for use in the United Kingdom. Morris transferred his interest to his company, Morris Motors Limited.

Pressed Steel was acquired in 1965 by the British Motor Corporation and this led to BMC's acquisition of Jaguar later in 1965 and merged its Fisher company into the new Pressed Steel Fisher Company. At the end of 1966 BMC changed its name to British Motor Holdings (BMH). BMH merged with Leyland Motors in 1968 to create British Leyland and Pressed Steel's businesses were absorbed into the new conglomerate and by 1969, it was known as the Pressed Steel Fisher Division of British Leyland.

Many components of the former Pressed Steel business were gradually divested following British Leyland's bankruptcy, nationalisation and subsequent restructuring. Today three major Pressed Steel factories are still in operation. The Cowley plant is now where BMW's Mini is assembled, known as Plant Oxford. At the old Swindon plant the BMW subsidiary Swindon Pressings Limited, or Plant Swindon, produces parts for the new Mini. Lastly, Pressed Steel's former factory in Castle Bromwich now forms part of Jaguar's main assembly plant.

== Morris and Budd ==
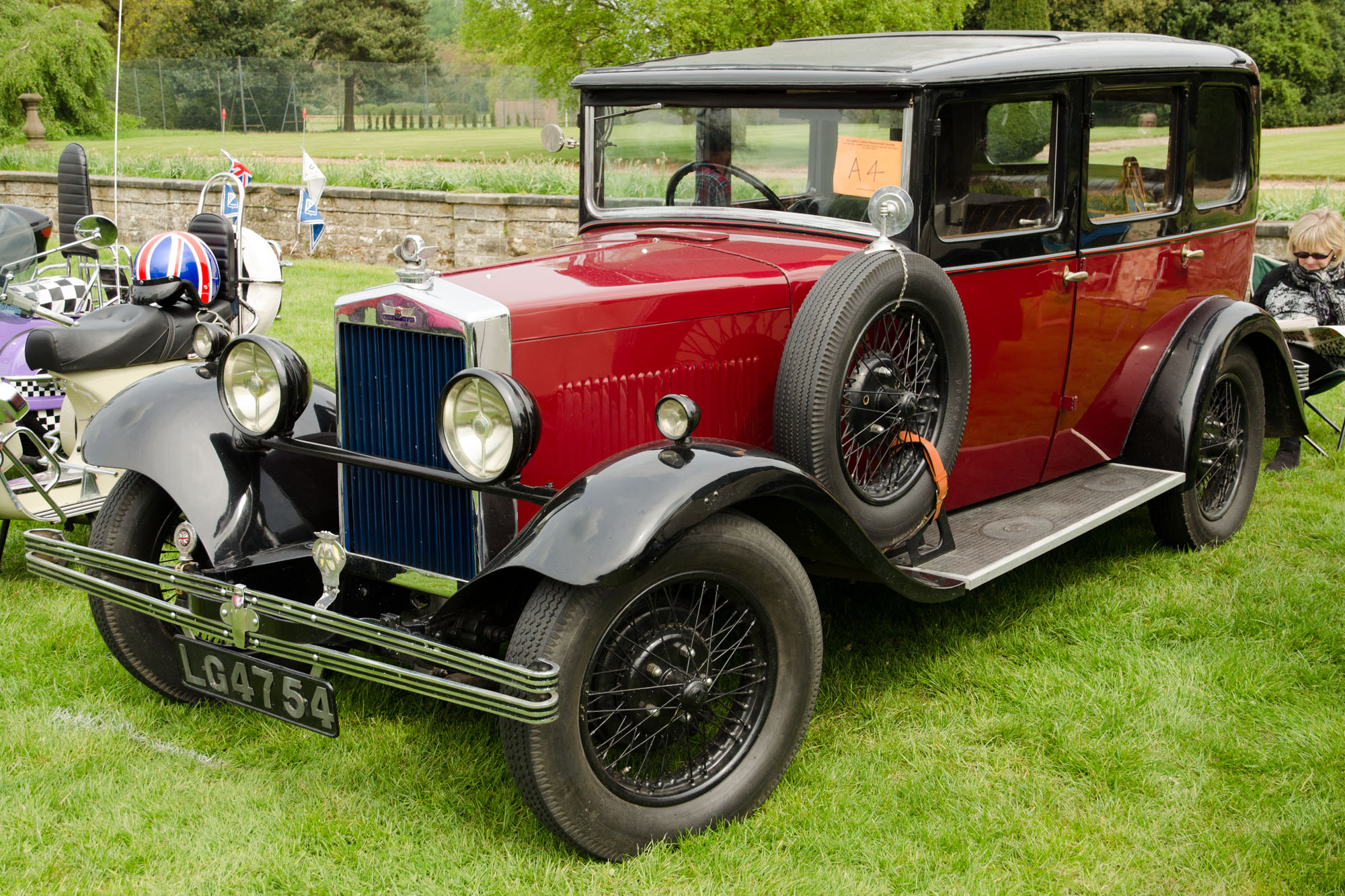
William Morris's all-steel Fifteen-Six saloon with Budd / Pressed Steel body

William Morris had recognised the potential of pressed steel car bodies being developed by Budd Corporation in U.S.A.and wanted them for his own cars. The new joint venture initially supplied car bodies to Morris's Morris Motors, with its plant located alongside the new Pressed Steel plant with what became the A4142 spanned by a special bridge between plants.

This was several years after André Citroën was co-operating with Budd in France for building Citroen car bodies.

The venture was not a success. In May 1930 it was announced that arrangements had been concluded to place the Pressed Steel plant under British control. Operations had not gathered pace as expected. Many difficulties (Note: It took some considerable time to gain the confidence of customers and to accustom workmen to a class of work that they had never done before. Steel sheets used: 1926 720 tons 1930 13,300 1935 30,900 and in 1937 they were running at the rate of 50,000 sheets per annum. Employees at Cowley works (annual average) 1926 873 1930 1,300 1935 2,950 on 28 April 1937 there were 4,322 employees Address of the chairman to shareholders. Pressed Steel Company. The Times, Saturday, 22 May 1937; pg. 19; Issue 47691) had been encountered. The British steel industry was unable to provide steel sheets large enough for the Budd machines and, once they came available, in any case American supplies were still 25% cheaper than local supplies. Tycoons William R. Morris and Edward G. Budd were unable to settle their differences.

Budd took his troubles with Morris to the High Court, which decided in Budd's favour and in June 1930, by a resolution of the shareholders supported by an order of the High Court, the directors of Morris Motors Limited were obliged to retire from the Pressed Steel board, with the share interests of Morris Motors either taken over by other interests or surrendered to the company. This was followed by the announcement of a reduction of Pressed Steel's capital from £1.6 million to £1.2 million. Morris lost the capital he had invested and the right to appoint directors, Pressed Steel was now free to supply other customers.

In the coachwork exhibition at the 1931 Olympia Motor Show alongside the products of Salmons, Thrupp and Maberly, Windovers etc. Pressed Steel Company displayed bodies of a Twelve-six Harley de luxe Austin saloon, a Hillman Wizard 75 de luxe saloon and a 12-horsepower six-cylinder Rover Pilot. Readers of The Times were told the bodies were made in four pieces, the back, two sides and the front. The doors were also stamped in one. These all-steel bodies were said to give the cars lightness with great strength, more room inside and better visibility.

== Independence ==
=== Cowley, Theale, Linwood I ===
At the very end of 1935 Budd agreed to sell their controlling interest to British interests and then Pressed Steel was fully independent having from mid-1930 also produced car bodies for Morris's competitors. (Note: Olympia Motor Show, October 1932. Pressed Steel, stand 172. All-steel bodies are well represented by the display of three production models: Hillman Wizard 65 saloon, Austin light twelve-six Harley saloon, 12 hp 4-cylinder Humber. They are made in four main parts, each part being stamped by a giant press into the required shape from sheet metal. The Olympia Show. The Times, Thursday, 20 October 1932; pg. 9; Issue 46269.)

The degree of completion of Pressed Steel's finished product varied widely. In some cases unpainted stampings were shipped to the customer's plant for finishing and assembly. In other cases, customers were sent their bodies fully assembled, painted, trimmed and glazed.

In 1944 W. A. Robotham saw that there would be limited postwar demand for Rolls-Royce or Bentley chassis with a body from a specialist coachbuilder, and negotiated with the company a contract for a general-purpose body to carry four people in comfort on their postwar chassis behind a Rolls-Royce or Bentley radiator. Though he stretched the demand to 2,000 per year, Pressed Steel were "nonplussed" by their small demand. The body was used for the Bentley Mark VI and Rolls-Royce Silver Dawn. They were assembled at Roll-Royce's Crewe works previously used for the Merlin aero engine, on a new body production line.

==== Industry consolidation 1953 ====
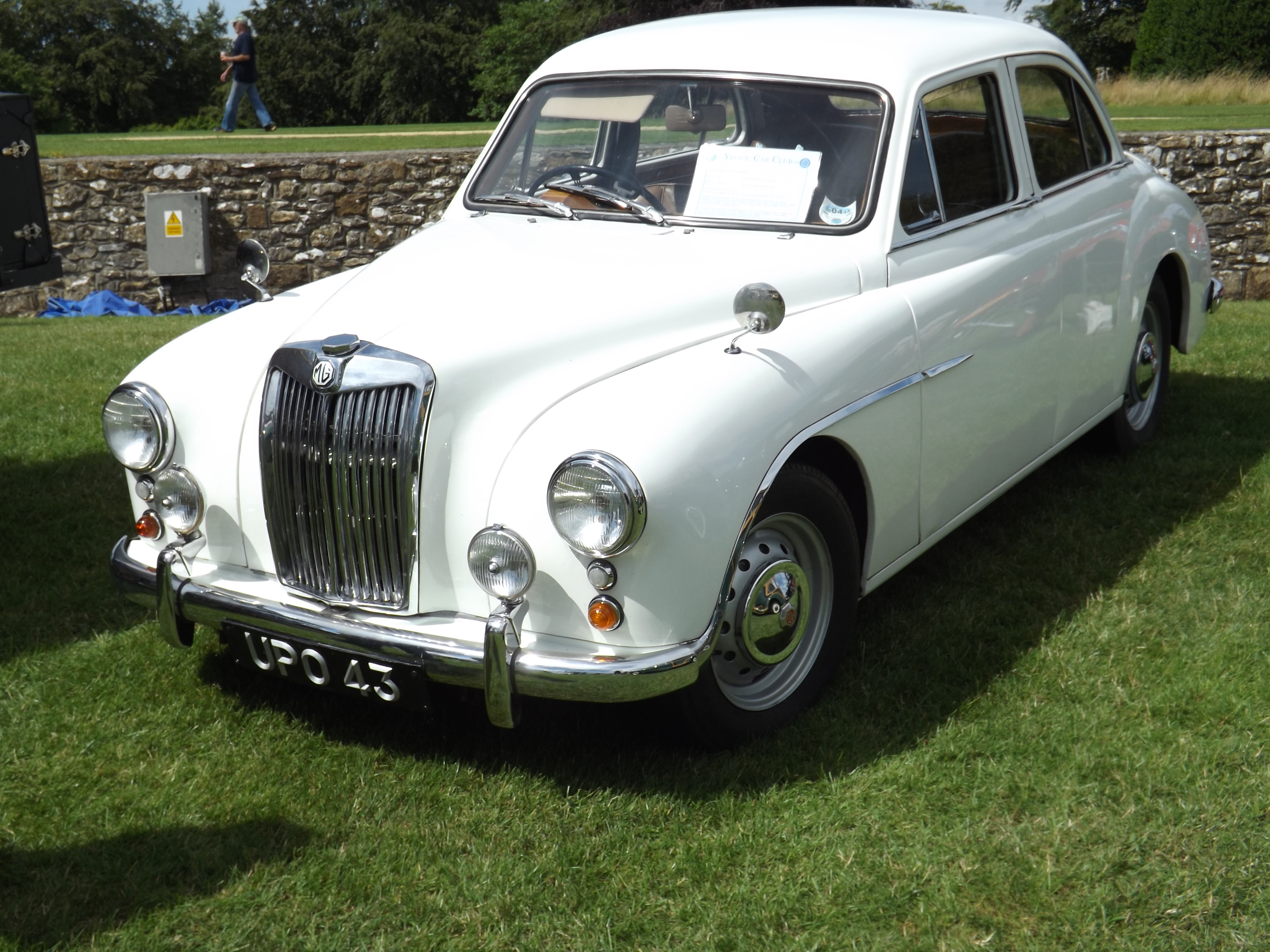
MG Magnette ZA

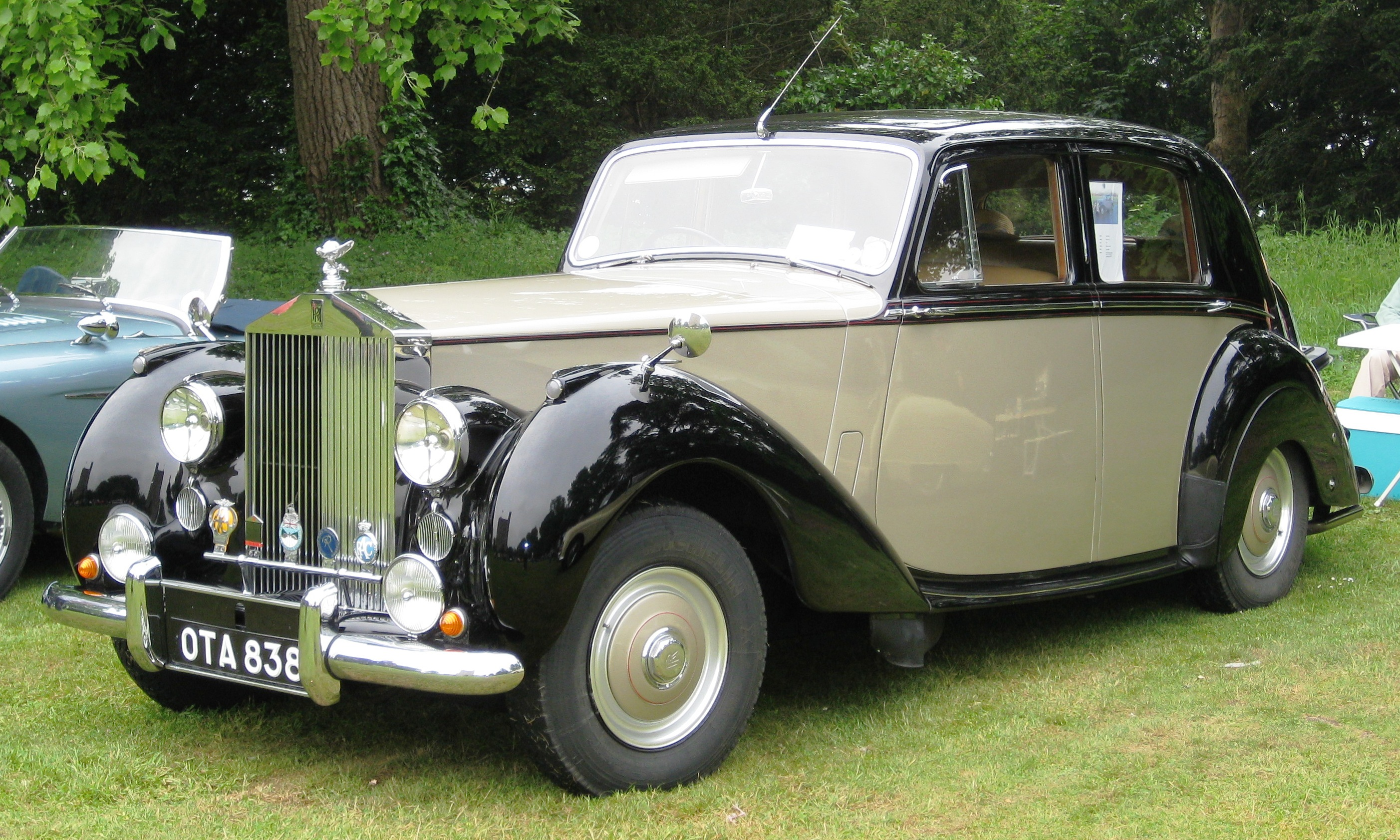
Standard Steel Rolls-Royce Silver Dawn with Pressed Steel pressings 1953

When compared with USA and France the British automotive industry then had little vertical integration. Britain's "Big Five" (Note: BMC, Ford, GM, Rootes, and Standard-Triumph) looked to their body suppliers. In the spring of 1953 Briggs Motor Bodies, American like Budd, had the bulk of its British operation swallowed by Ford. The following autumn The British Motor Corporation acquired Fisher & Ludlow. Fisher & Ludlow supplied Standard-Triumph who were then obliged to take control of the relatively small Mulliners but that took a few more years to develop and Mulliners was to close at the end of 1960. Pressed Steel stood alone as the only remaining independent supplier of mass-produced car bodies in Britain.

In December 1953 Pressed Steel Company Limited was able to advertise: "The largest press shops in Europe with over 350 power presses working with pressures up to 1000 tons . . . a factory area at Cowley alone more than half the size of Hyde Park . . . Here, indeed, with its 12,000 and more workers, is one of Britain's greatest industrial enterprises."

Factories: Cowley, Oxford. Theale, Berkshire. Linwood, Scotland.
Head Office: Cowley
London Office: Sceptre House, 169 Regent Street W1.
Manufacturers of bodywork and pressings for many of the most famous names in the British motor-car industry, including Austin, Daimler, Hillman, Humber, Jaguar, Lanchester, Morris, Morris Commercial, MG, Riley, Rover, Singer, Wolseley. (Note: BMC and Rootes Group with Singer. Jaguar and Rover)
The largest body manufacturers in Britain and pioneers in Britain of pressed steel bodywork and unitary construction in quantity.
Manufacturer of Prestcold refrigerators, steel railway wagons, agricultural implements and pressings of all types.
Names to which pressings were supplied not included in the above list include Rolls-Royce and Bentley, Alfa Romeo, Volvo, Vauxhall.

=== Swindon, Linwood II ===
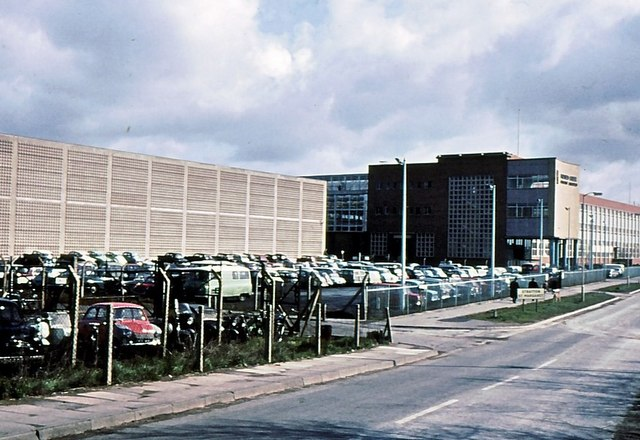
The Swindon pressing plant in 1967

In 1956 they opened a new plant in Swindon to provide extra capacity, and in 1961 they opened their Linwood, Scotland plant alongside the new Rootes Linwood plant to provide bodies for the new Hillman Imp being produced there. By the end of the 20th century the Linwood site had been completely cleared. It is now partly occupied by a cinema complex.

=== Tooling ===
Pressed Steel was a major manufacturer of press tooling for Morris, Hillman, Rover and Rolls-Royce and car companies across the world including Vauxhall, Alfa Romeo etc.

=== Research and development ===
The R&D function, which was set up at the Cowley site in the early 1960s, and later transferred to their development site at Gaydon [1980], was a centre of excellence for the industry with many new processes including the development of electrophoretic painting (electrocoat), full mould casting, robotic welding and assembly, robotic adhesive and sealant application and robotic painting amongst many other firsts in the industry.

In the late 1960s, and the early 1970s, the R&D function pioneered the use of Finite Element Analysis for the body structure, and developed computerised crash simulation techniques for the complete vehicle, the occupants and the pedestrian.

In 1969, the British Leyland Zanda was displayed at the British International Motor Show as a showcase for Pressed Steel Fisher's new CAD capabilities, and was claimed to be the first use of CAD in Europe.

Between 1973 & 1980 the R & D function also developed plastic fuel tanks that proved superior to the only other current ones of the time produced by Volkswagen.

== British Leyland and BMW ==
By 1965 Pressed Steel employed 26,000 people. Its sales to the British motor industry - over 90% of turnover - were by value 40% to BMC and a similar share to Rootes. However BMC's bodies were relatively unfinished, whereas Rootes' bodies were painted and trimmed, so 61% of unit volume went to BMC and 27% to Rootes.

BMC purchased only a quarter to a third of its requirements from Pressed Steel, obtaining the rest from subsidiaries Fisher & Ludlow, Nuffield Metal Products, Austin, Morris Commercial Cars and Morris Motor Bodies. Rootes Group was almost entirely dependent on Pressed Steel for its car bodies. Jaguar and Rover were wholly or very largely dependent on Pressed Steel for their car bodies.

A factor covered in the Monopolies Commission report was Chrysler's association with Rootes Group, so that there was the possibility of a take-over from the United States putting Jaguar's and Rover's body supplies at risk if BMC's proposal was vetoed. It was also noted by the commission that an internal document drawn up while negotiations between BMC and Pressed Steel were in progress set out the terms and assurances to be offered to customers, including that the continuance of supply of bodies or tools to customers other than BMC would be subject to BMC's own requirements. The commission subsequently obtained assurances that allocations will be made to all customers on a pro rata basis.

In 1965 Pressed Steel was acquired by the British Motor Corporation and BMC set about combining Pressed Steel with its existing body-making subsidiary Fisher and Ludlow, acquired by BMC some twelve years earlier, thereby creating Pressed Steel-Fisher (PS-F). At the time of the merger Pressed Steel was the largest independent manufacturer of car bodies and car body tooling in the world.

In the third quarter of 1966 BMC completed its takeover of Jaguar Cars On 14 December 1966 BMC shareholders approved the change of its name to British Motor Holdings (BMH) and it took effect from that moment.

Early in 1968 BMH merged with the Leyland Motor Corporation (LMC) to form the British Leyland Motor Corporation (BLMC), By this time PS-F had become the world's largest independent car body and car body tool manufacturer, and supplied bodies and tools not only for the British motor industry but also for Volvo, Alfa Romeo and Hindustan Motors. Under BLMC the Pressed Steel-Fisher business became the Pressed Steel Fisher division.

In 1975 BLMC was nationalised and became British Leyland Limited.

=== Cowley ===
Logo of Pressed Steel Fisher in 1979

Following the formation of British Leyland Motor Corporation (BLMC) in 1968, Cowley became part of the Pressed Steel Fisher (PS-F) division. The plant continued as a major supplier of pressed steel bodies and sub-assemblies for BLMC marques including Austin, Morris, Rover, and Triumph, reflecting the group’s rationalisation of platforms and body tooling across its product range.

During the 1970s, Cowley remained a core high-volume body production site, though it operated under increasing financial pressure and industrial unrest affecting BLMC. Production was focused increasingly on mass-market models, particularly those assembled in the adjacent Oxford facilities.

After the formation of British Leyland Limited in 1975, Cowley continued as part of the group’s principal manufacturing base. In 1994 it passed to BMW following the acquisition of Rover Group, and later became Plant Oxford. BMW retained the site after the 2000 divestment of Rover assets, and it was subsequently redeveloped for production of the BMW Mini, supplied in part by Swindon Pressings.

=== Swindon ===
The Swindon plant was developed as a major pressing facility for the Rover Group and its predecessors, supplying body panels and sub-assemblies across a wide range of production vehicles. By the late 20th century it had become one of the UK’s key automotive stamping plants.

Following BMW’s acquisition of Rover Group in 1994, Swindon became BMW-owned. After most Rover assets were sold in 2000, BMW retained the plant and established Swindon Pressings Limited (SPL), which continues to supply body components for the BMW Mini produced at Plant Oxford.

=== Linwood ===
The Linwood site in Scotland was established in the early 1960s as part of government-backed industrial expansion linked to Chrysler’s UK operations. It was intended for high-volume vehicle production but suffered from logistical and productivity challenges.

Following the formation of British Leyland, Linwood became part of the group but remained underperforming. The plant was closed in 1981 as part of wider rationalisation within BLMC.

=== Theale ===
Theale was a smaller Pressed Steel facility focused on supporting pressing, tooling, and component supply within the wider British Leyland network. It played a supplementary role rather than acting as a major production site.

Over time, its functions were reduced as production was consolidated into larger facilities, and it was eventually wound down during industry restructuring in the late 20th century.

== Diversification ==
=== Domestic Refrigerator Factory ===
Under the Prestcold name Pressed Steel supplied refrigerators for the home, industrial cold rooms and marine installations. The Domestic Refrigeration Factory (DRF)—it was publicly acknowledged the product of the first four years was not reliable—started in 1933 and was located within the Cowley site for many years before transferring to Swansea in a government sponsored regeneration scheme, an ill-fated venture with Rolls washing machines. As a supplier to entrepreneur John Bloom's company when Rolls Razor went into liquidation in July 1964 Pressed Steel was owed $1,200,000. So ended Prestcold domestic appliances.

Industrial refrigeration supplied on a large scale to supermarkets and food retailing groups was to continue for many years operating out of the Theale site nr. Reading.

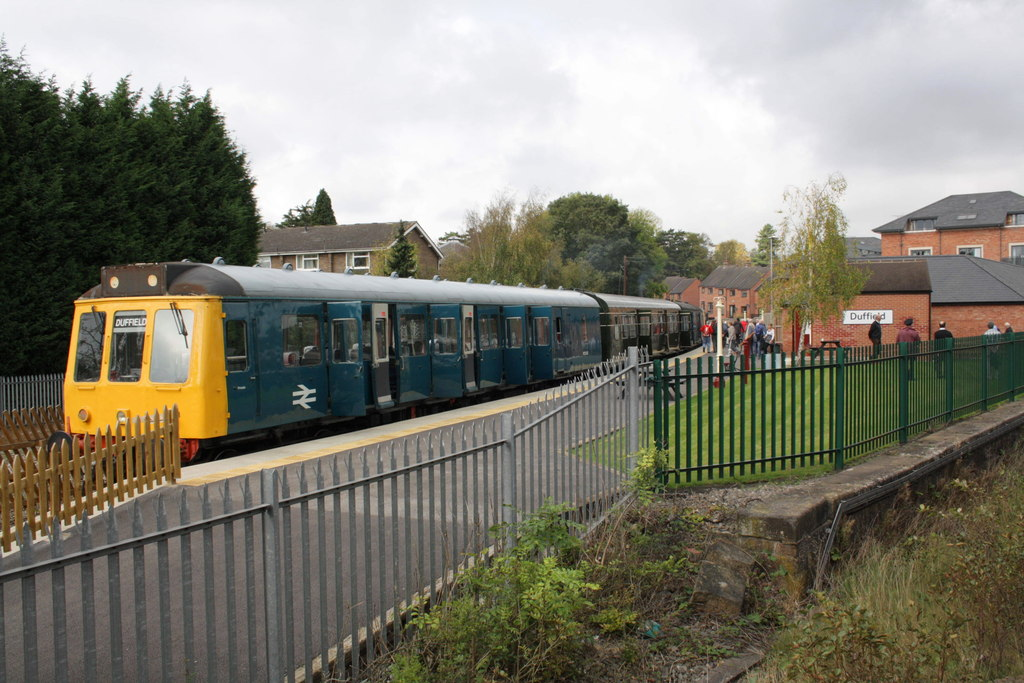
Class 117 Pressed Steel suburban unit no. 51360

=== Railway rolling stock, Linwood ===
An existing engineering factory in Linwood, Scotland, was acquired by Pressed Steel in 1947 where they manufactured railway rolling stock. A peak of production was reached in the late 1950s – early 1960s. The types of rolling stock produced were of standard British Railways design, and included: standard carriages, British Rail Class 117 Diesel Multiple Units, British Rail Class 303 "Blue Train" Electric Multiple Units, and specialist vehicles like restaurant cars. Pressed Steel received few orders after the completion of the changeover to diesel trains and modern carriages.

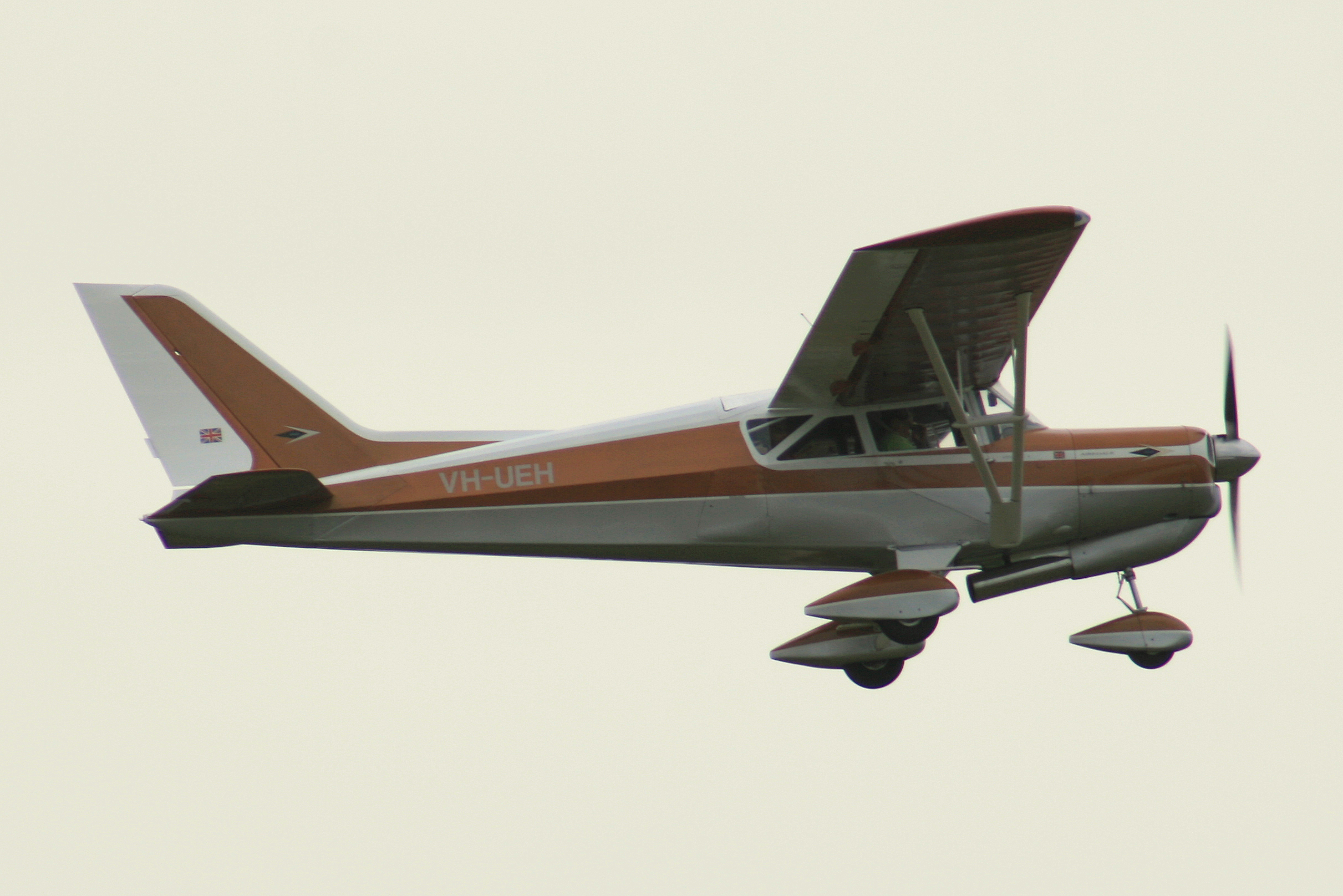
Beagle Airedale 1961

=== Beagle Aircraft ===
British Executive and General Aviation Limited. In 1960 Pressed Steel was persuaded by Sir Peter Masefield to invest in light aircraft through the formation of its Beagle Aircraft division. Beagle was sold to the government in December 1966. This venture lost Pressed Steel about £3M.

Beagle's facilities at Shoreham-by-Sea were purchased with their take-over of Miles Aircraft and those at Rearsby with Auster.
