= Prestcold =

- Prestcold logo, featuring Pressed Steel Company motif
- Industry: Refrigeration
- Founded: 1933; 93 years ago
- Defunct: Approx 1990; 36 years ago
- Fate: Bought by Emerson Electric and brand retired
- Headquarters: Cowley, Oxford
- Key people: William Morris, 1st Viscount Nuffield (co-founder); Edward G. Budd (co-founder)
- Products: Domestic, commercial and industrial cooling systems
- Parent: Morris Motors Limited (1926–1930); Budd Company (1926–1935); Independent (1935–1966); British Leyland (1966–1981); Suter plc (1981–1984); Copeland/Emerson (1984–)

Prestcold was a British refrigerator manufacturer, established by the Pressed Steel Co. Ltd of Oxford in 1934. It manufactured both domestic and commercial refrigeration equipment. Through its history, it was closely related to automotive manufacturing, particularly that of Morris Motors and successor British Leyland. Refrigerators were originally produced alongside car bodies at the Pressed Steel facility built for Morris, adjacent to the Morris factory.

== Formation and early years ==
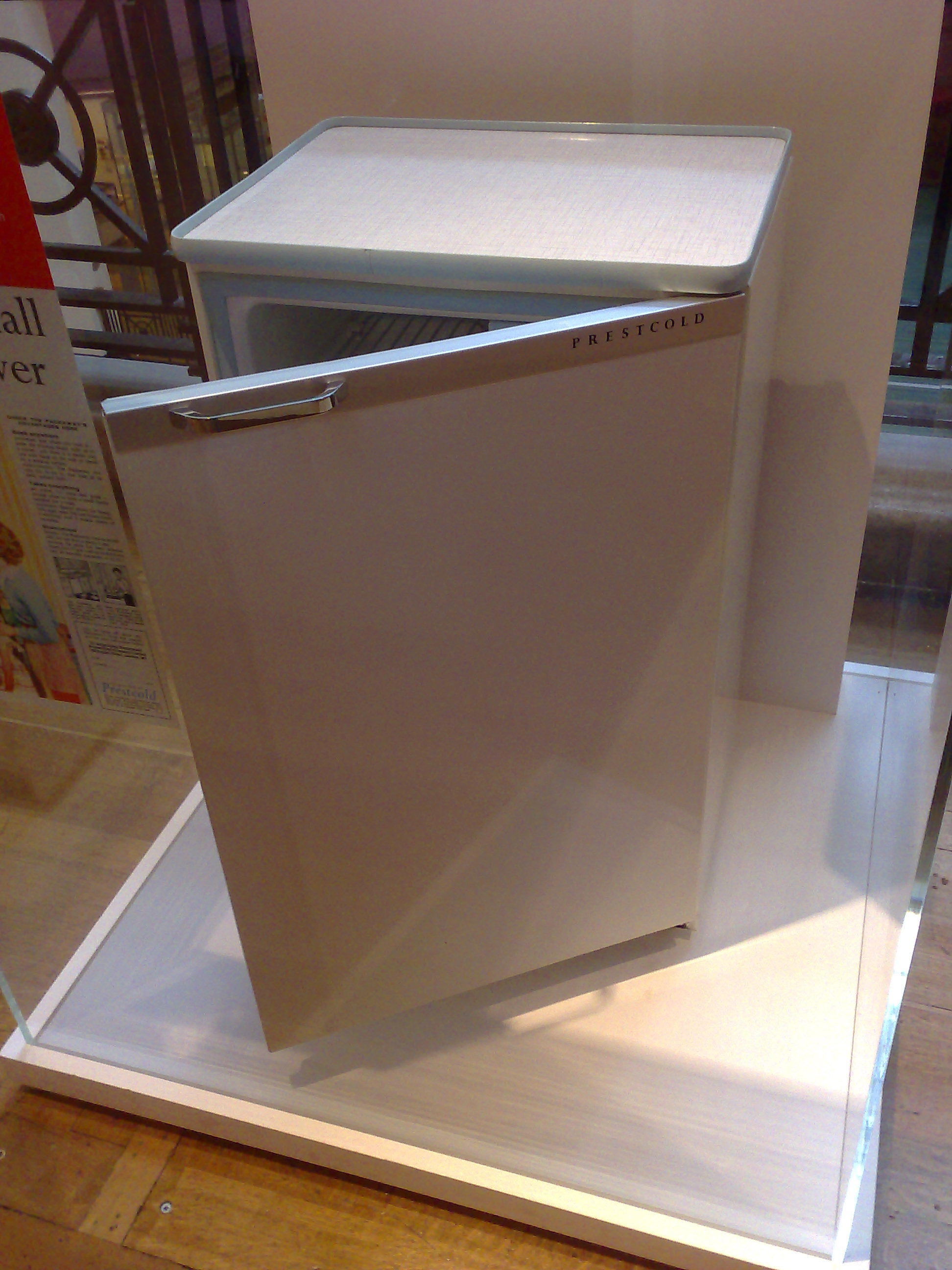
The Prestcold packaway refrigerator, winner of the 1959 Duke of Edinburgh's design award

The Pressed Steel Co. Ltd was a joint venture formed in 1926 between William Morris of Morris Motors, the American Budd Company and J. Henry Schröder & Co. bank. It was formed primarily to make car bodies for Morris' car marques, and the factory was adjacent to the Morris works at Cowley. In 1930, disagreements between Morris and Budd led to court action, and Pressed Steel gained a measure of independence, producing for manufacturers other than Morris. Following this, in 1935, the company became fully independent.

Initial production of refrigerators was conducted in 1933 at the Cowley plant (now the Plant Oxford site, manufacturing Mini cars for BMW).

In 1936, a wholly owned subsidiary, Refrigeration (Birmingham) Ltd was formed to manufacture fridges.

The company engaged in innovative advertising strategies, including the creation of over 100,000 miniature fridge-shaped money boxes to emphasise how their product could save the consumer money.

The Prestcold Packaway refrigerator won the inaugural Duke of Edinburgh's Prize for Elegant Design (later the Prince Philip Designers Prize) in 1959. The model was successful, with a number of design elements including a small exterior dimension compared to its internal capacity, and being sized with both British Standard and European Free Trade Area requirements in mind.

By 1961, the company had over 100 employees, and had opened a brand new £5M factory at Crymlyn Burrows, Swansea, The factory covered 450,000 square feet (42,000 m^{2}) and took just a year to build, with many of the workers being relocated by the company from Cowley.

== Washing machines and leaving the domestic market ==
In the early 1960s, John Bloom’s Rolls Razor company sub-contracted Prestcold to manufacture his low price Rolls Rapide washing machines as part of an extensive deal, which involved Rolls becoming a distributor of Prestcold fridges, and joint branding of Rolls-Prestcold.

This was initially successful, but when Rolls went into administration in 1964, Prestcold was owed $1.2m, and the debt caused Prestcold to withdraw completely from the domestic appliance market, focusing on the commercial market instead.

As a result the Crymlyn Burrows factory was sold to the Ford Motor Company in 1965, and used to manufacture car parts.

== British Leyland ==
Prestcold, along with other parts of Pressed Steel, was absorbed into BMC in 1966 which became part of British Leyland in 1969. Prestcold became part of Leyland Special Products after the Ryder Report of 1975.

This once again put it back in the same ownership as the former Morris Motors sites adjacent to the Cowley factory.

Prestcold was part of the Leyland Special Products division, later SP Industries, along with diverse interests such as Aveling-Barford and Nuffield Press.

Under British Leyland, Prestcold acquired the Glasgow-based industrial refrigeration specialist L. Sterne and Co for £3m in 1968, which doubled the size of the refrigeration business.

Divestments left Prestcold as one of the only non-automotive manufacturing divisions within the British Leyland group, but it was retained due to its research on air conditioning for cars, which was seen as strategically important.

== Later ownership ==
There were a number of acquisitions for the company, including the Gardiner Refrigeration and Air Conditioning company in 1975, and in 1976, Prestcold bought the Searle company from Hall Thermotank, giving the company around half of the UK's capacity for building heat exchangers.

The former L Sterne factory in Glasgow was closed in 1979 with the loss of 900 jobs.

In 1981 Prestcold was acquired by Suter plc, a diverse engineering and chemicals company based in Grantham, Lincolnshire, and headed by David Abell, the former managing director of Leyland Special Products. Abell had to resign his post as then Managing Director of BL Commercial Vehicles because of the potential conflict of interest created.

In 1984, Prestcold was sold by Suter to the American Copeland Corporation (now part of Emerson Electric), with the Prestcold brand disappearing in the 1990s from the UK. The Theale site still manufactures compressor systems for Emerson.

The Prestcold brand name was also used for household refrigerators by McAlpine Prestcold Limited in New Zealand.

== Factories ==
- Cowley, Oxfordshire - 1933-1961
- Theale, near Reading, Berkshire
- Crymlyn Burrows, Swansea - 1961-1965
- Hillington, Glasgow, Scotland - until 1979
