= Templars Square =

- The interior of Templars Square in October 2008
- Location: Cowley, Oxfordshire
- Coordinates: 51.732147°N 1.216974°W
- Address: 129 Pound Way, Oxford OX4 3XH
- Opened: May 1965 (as Cowley Centre)
- Manager: Aaron Bayliss
- Owner: Redevco
- Website: templarssquare.com

Templars Square is a shopping centre located in Between Towns Road, Cowley, Oxford, England. It was opened in 1965 and was known as Cowley Centre until 1989.

== Development and construction ==
A shopping centre in central Cowley was first proposed in the late 1950s. By 1959, the proposal had received strong endorsement from Oxford City Council, and an embargo on new shopping developments along the nearby Cowley Road was enforced. The development was opposed by William Beveridge, who felt that Cowley was the wrong location for the centre.

Construction of the development, by now known as Cowley Centre, began in 1960. Its design was inspired by new town centres and North American shopping malls. The shopping centre was designed by the Oxford City Architects E. G. Chandler and Douglas Murray. Between Towns Road was realigned when Cowley Centre was built.

== Opening and subsequent history ==
Cowley Centre was opened in May 1965 by Richard Crossman, then Minister of Housing and Local Government. The opening ceremony was attended by over 300 people.

In 1970, the Sainsbury's store at the northern end of the centre was extended, requiring the demolition of a local pub, which was rebuilt around twenty yards away. The Sainsbury's store later closed and was replaced by branches of Wilkinson and Iceland.

The centre was renamed to Templars Square in 1989, and celebrated its 20th year under the name with a series of events in August 2009. In January 2014 part of the centre's glass roof was damaged in a storm.

== Facilities ==
As of August 2009, Templars Square has 63 retailers, making it the largest shopping centre in Oxford. This number had decreased from 85 in 2002, partly because of the 2008 financial crisis; one of the largest stores, Woolworths, closed in December 2009. However, overall trade at the centre was largely unaffected by the recession. The Woolworth's site has since been taken over by 99p Stores. As of June 2010, the centre's occupancy rate is 96%.

Templars Square has a six-storey car park. This opened in 1964, a year before the shopping centre. In July 2009 the top deck of the car park was temporarily closed after three people died by falling from it.

The centre is located adjacent to the Templars Retail Park, which was legally restricted to non-food sales to avoid competition with the centre. In December 2010 a proposal was announced to relax the restriction and open a new supermarket at the site, which was opposed by the centre's management. This has since changed with a Sainsbury's superstore opening in this retail park.

== Future development ==
In 2012 New River bought the centre and soon revealed redevelopment plans. Plans for redevelopment of the centre including 200 homes, shops, two restaurants and a hotel received planning permission in July 2017 however, the approved scheme had not been implemented, and Redevco was reviewing options for redevelopment of the site.

In April 2022 NewRiver sold Templars Square to Redevco for £38.8 million.
