= Allen Scythe =

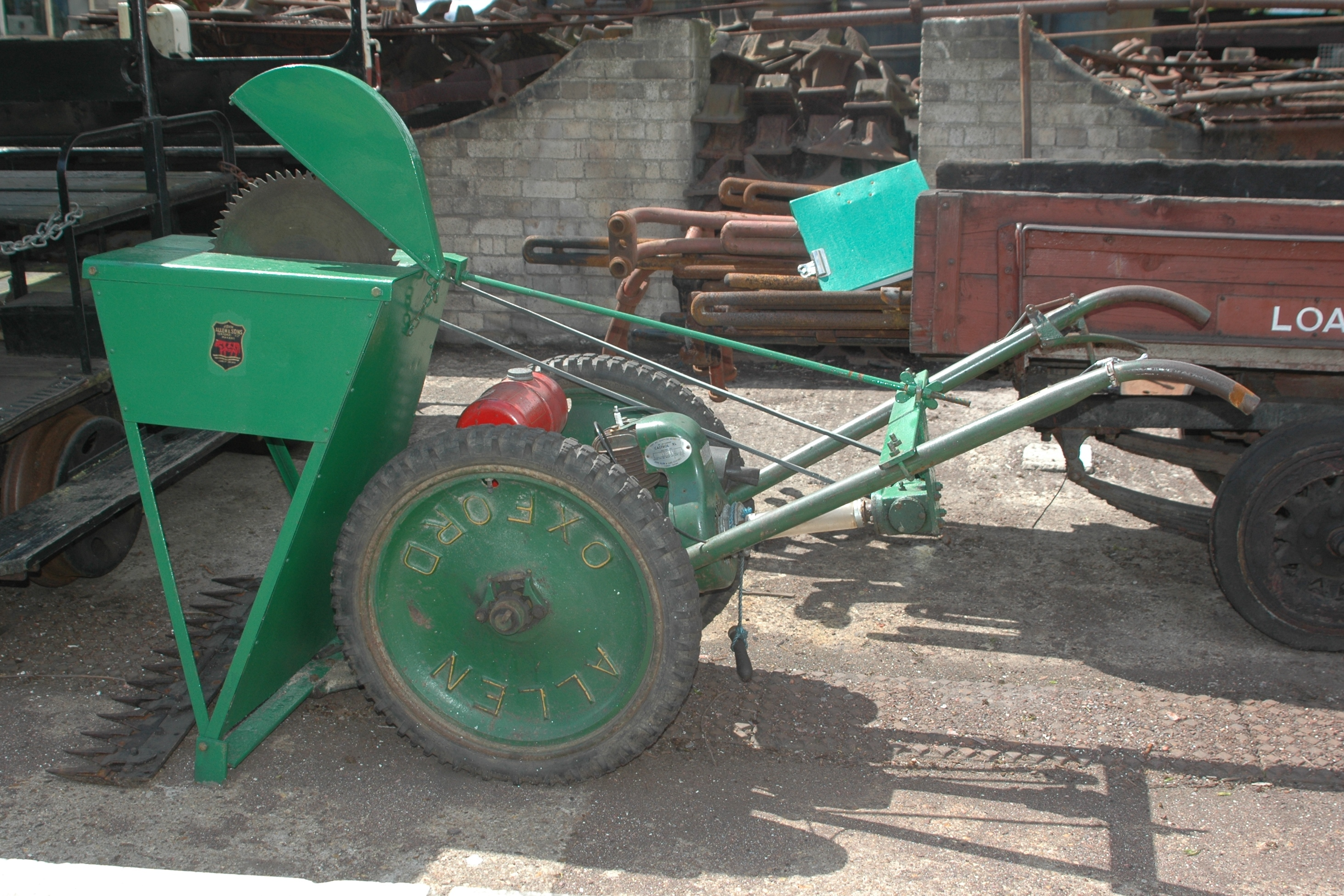
Allen Scythe with rotary saw attachment preserved at Didcot Railway Centre, England

The Allen Scythe, sometimes called the Allen Power Scythe, is a petrol-powered finger-bar mower. It was made from 1933 until 1973 by John Allen and Sons in Cowley, Oxfordshire. The company, formerly the Eddison and Nodding Company, was bought in 1897 by John Allen, who renamed it the Oxford Steam Plough Company, and then renamed it to John Allen and Sons.

== Description ==
The Allen Scythe does not resemble a hand scythe but serves the same purpose. The engine drives a 2-foot-wide (0.6 m) or 3-foot-wide (0.9 m) or 4ft wide toothed blade sliding back and forth horizontally across stationary teeth to produce a scissor action, and also drives two large wheels for forward travel. There are handles to allow the machine to be controlled by an operator walking behind it, controls comprise throttle and clutch. The wheels are driven through ratchets which allow either wheel to free-wheel when steering the machine (the wheel on the outside of the turn will be able to rotate faster than the inside wheel). This system is simpler than a differential axle and, unlike a differential, means that when one wheel slips the other keeps turning and driving the machine forwards. It has the disadvantage that the machine can run away from the operator downhill and for this reason the ratchet mechanisms can be locked. The machines are extremely robust and many from the 1950s are still in regular use. They can be dangerous, as the clutch system only disengages the wheel drive from the engine: the blades cut all the time the engine runs.

Later models were available with different attachments, including rotating brushes that replaced the cutting head, air or water pumps and saws or hedge trimmers that drove from the starting pulley side of the engine.

== Engine ==
John Allen and Sons used a number of engine types, the most common being a Villiers two-stroke with magneto ignition and rope start. The engines may fail to start because of ignition problems. The spark should occur when the piston is 3/16 of an inch before top dead centre (TDC) on all Villiers engines except for the Villiers Mk. 11C & 25C which should spark 5/32 of an inch before TDC.

== Popular culture ==
Episode 6 of the BBC Two reality television series Wartime Farm featured an Allen Scythe. Cast members Alex Langlands and Peter Ginn used it to harvest hay in a churchyard.
