= Oxford Mutual Aid =

Oxford-based food poverty non-profit

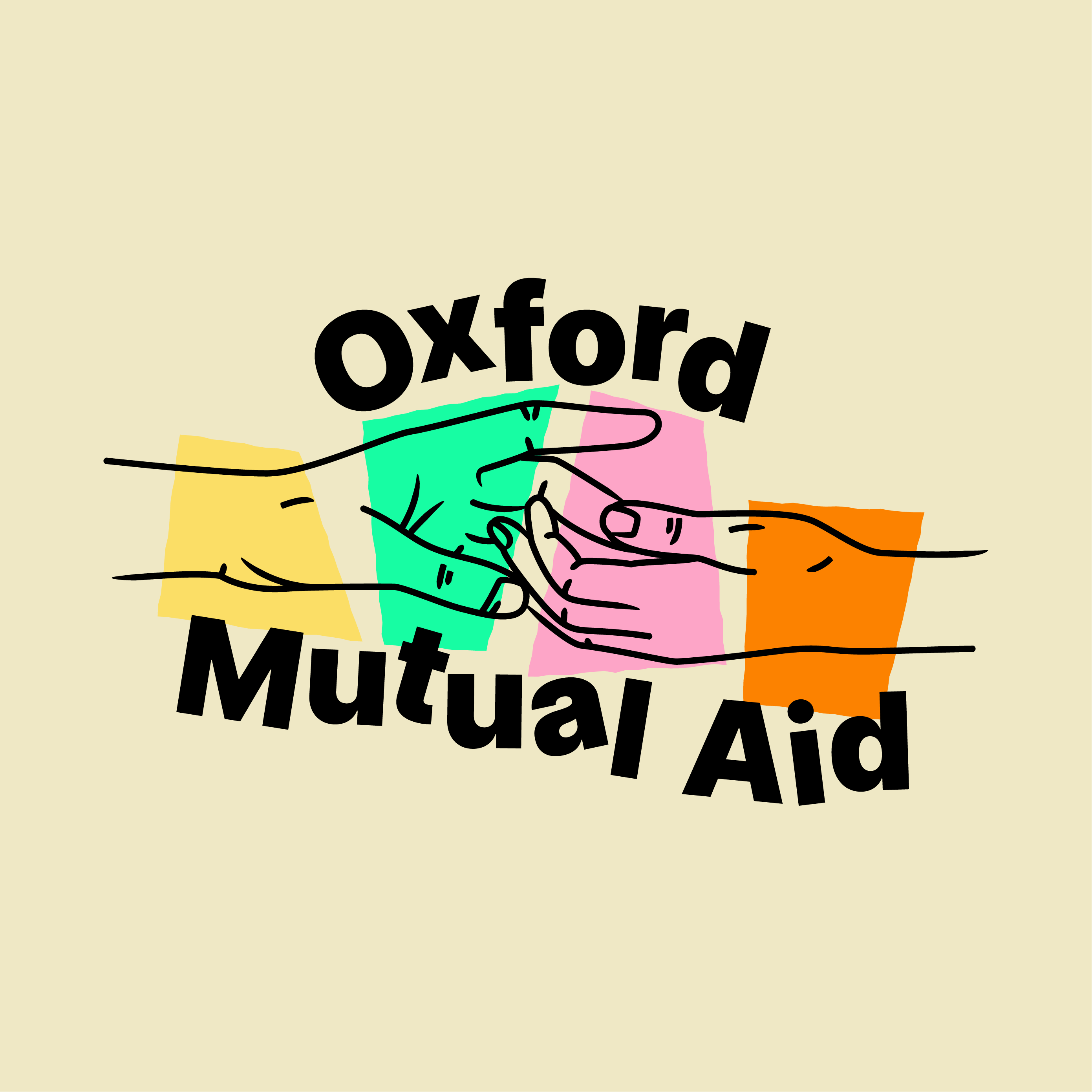
Oxford Mutual Aid's Logo

Oxford Mutual Aid is an Oxford based mutual aid organisation, founded in 2020 as a response to the COVID-19 pandemic.

Initially founded as a Facebook group to make and trade masks and supplies, the organisation has since grown into one of the biggest food poverty organisations in the city, claiming to have over 1000 volunteers.

Whilst originally providing food parcels to those self-isolating, the organisation now provides support in the form of weekly and emergency food parcels, and claims to feed over 1000 people every month. Based in the Cowley Road area of Oxford, the organisation delivers parcels direct-to-door across the entirety of Oxford City.

The organisation does not means test, unlike many food poverty organisations, but follows a similar model otherwise to many food banks.

Oxford Mutual Aid is a part of the OX4 Food Crew, an alliance of 9 East Oxford based food poverty organisations.

== History ==
The group has consistently campaigned on issues of local food poverty, inequality and cost of living in the City of Oxford.

In early 2024, the organisation was threatened with closure, as funding related to the cost-of-living crisis was reduced

In 2024, the group partnered with Velocity Cycle Couriers, part-funded by Oxford City Council, to assist with 'awkward' deliveries in the cities controversial zero-emission zone.

In November 2024, as a result of winter flooding at suppliers, Oxford Mutual Aid was forced to close for several weeks. The organisation later warned in early 2025 of a steep rise in first-time requests, suggesting that food poverty was on the rise as a result of cuts to benefits

== See also ==
- Oxford Mutual Aid - The organisations website
