= British Leyland Zanda =

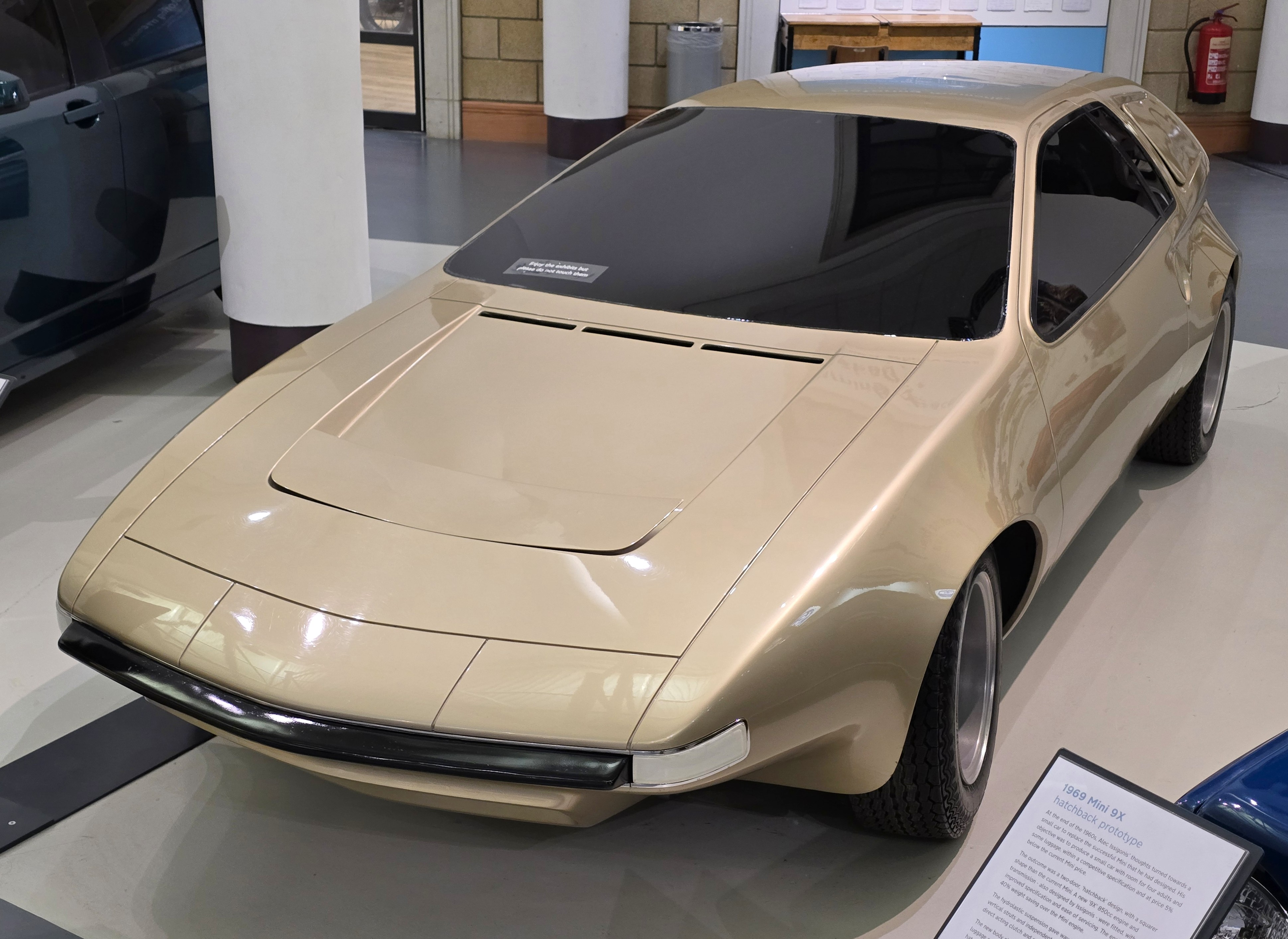
The Zanda on display at the British Motor Museum in 2024

The British Leyland Zanda Grand Turismo is a concept car first unveiled at the British International Motor Show in 1969 on the Pressed Steel stand. It was not designed as a future model but to showcase the Austin Morris design capability and the technical capability of Pressed Steel.

The car is non-running and is on show at the British Motor Museum in Gaydon. Originally finished in a lime green, it is currently painted in gold metallic.

The design was by Harris Mann and led by Roy Haynes. It features a wedge shape that was to become his trademark in the later Triumph TR7. Mann was said to have been inspired by Bertone’s Alfa Romeo Carabo from the year before.

The design was developed using Computer-aided design and the Zanda was used to promote the advanced capabilities of British Leyland's subsidiary Pressed Steel, and claimed to be the first to use CAD in Europe.

Though sometimes referred to as the Austin Zanda, it was not promoted or badged as an Austin, but was considered to be an Austin Morris design together with the proposed mechanics being from the Austin Maxi.
