= Rolls Razor =

British manufacturer

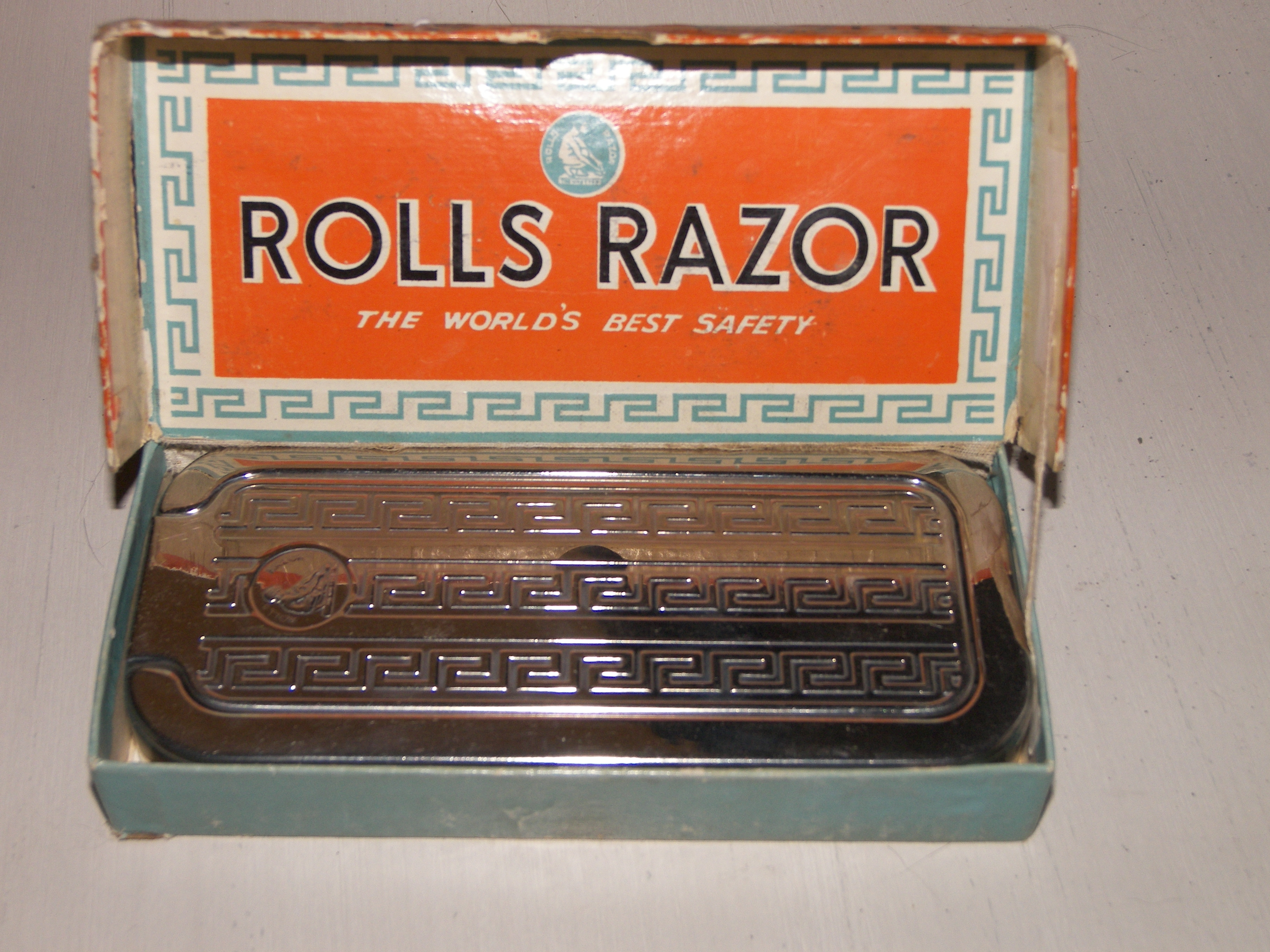
Rolls Razor model: Imperial No. 2 in closed chrome-plated case with the meander decoration

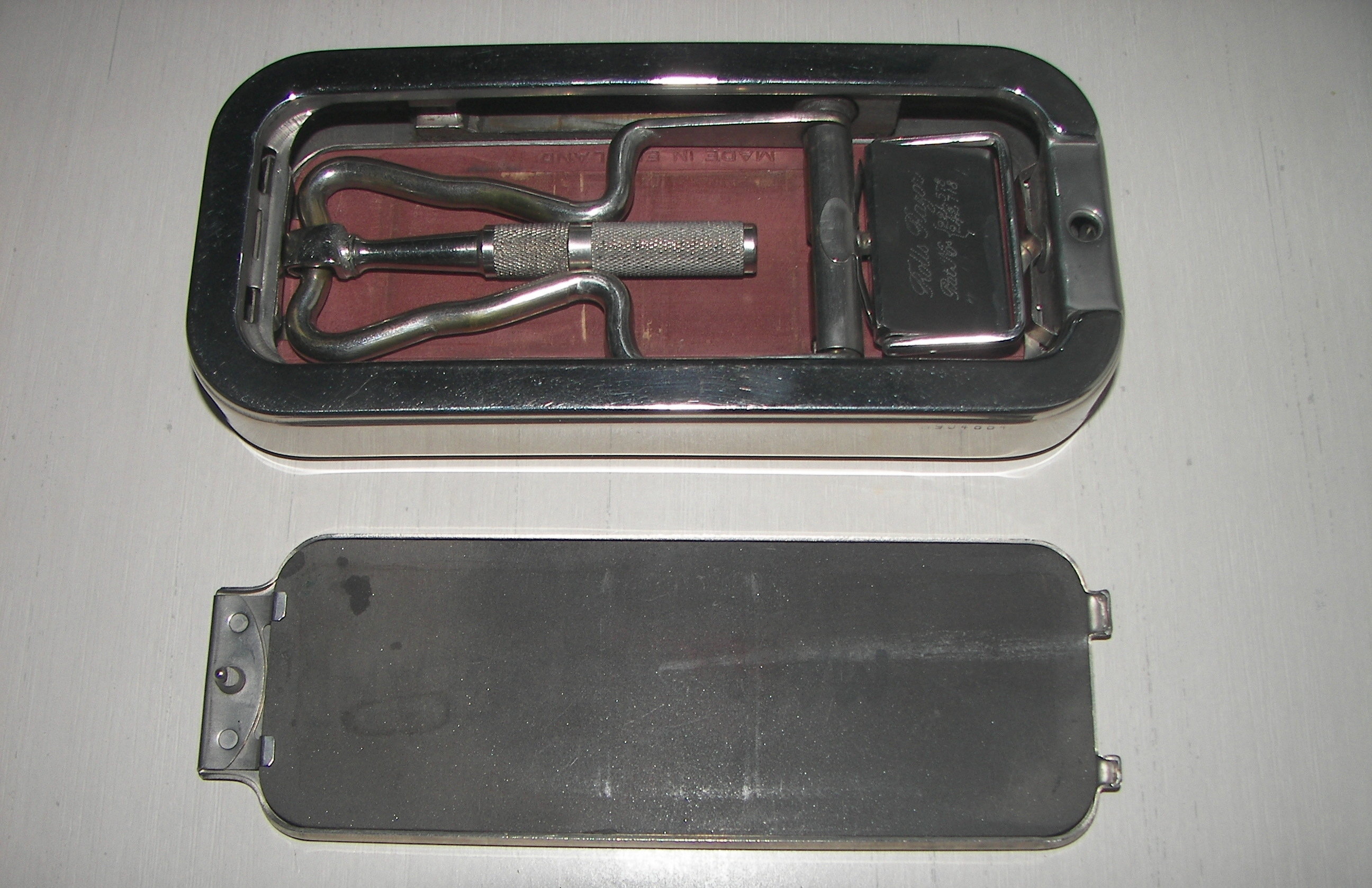
Rolls Razor open case. The blade handle on the left is attached to the honing mechanism lever via a spring-loaded bearing. The nickel plated blade on the right side is attached to the honing bar that slides on the red leather strop. The grey honing stone is part of the closing lid. The leather strop and the hone lids are not interchangeable as the blade needs to push against the hone but pull against the strop. The blade has a safety guard with pivot action that allows it to vary the shaving angle while providing safe operation. The head of the blade handle locks perpendicular to the blade using a slide type of action with the spring-loaded bearing providing additional stability.

Rolls Razor Limited was a British company known first for its manufacture of a sophisticated safety razor and later, under new ownership, an "affordable" twin-tub washing machine.

== Origins: razor ==
The eponymous product was a sophisticated safety razor which was promoted with the slogan "The razor that is stropped and honed in its case".

The case was a rigid rectangular frame enclosed by two detachable lids; one lid carried a stone and the other a leather. The lids could not be interchanged. With a lid removed, oscillating a handle drove a shaft along the frame. In both directions pinions on the shaft engaged with racks on the case to rotate the shaft to either push the blade forward against the stone or drag it against the strop. It was easy to use, fast and safe. Sharpening was noisy as each change of direction rotated the blade to slap against stone or leather.

The blade was about the size of a conventional disposable blade but was solid, hollow ground and not disposable, and it incorporated a safety guard.

The company's principal market was a 21st birthday present for a young man. Sales declined with the rise of electric shaving.

The Rolls trademark, "The Whetter", was registered in the US in 1950; the claimed first use was 1922. The US patent for the method of attaching the blade to the handle was filed in 1925 and issued in 1930. The name "Rolls Razor (1927) Ltd." was used in advertising. The razor was still manufactured and sold until 1958, when the company was purchased by entrepreneur/corporate raider John Bloom, who decided to focus on washing machines rather than the razor.

Although Rolls Razor had no connection to the Rolls-Royce company, the name was chosen to evoke the "Rolls" image of luxury and quality. The factory address was 255 Cricklewood Broadway, London, NW2, with showrooms located at 197a, Regent St., London, W1. A US importer was Lee & Schiffer, East 44th St., New York City. By 1937 the US distributor was Rolls Razor, Inc., 305 East 45th St., New York.

Rolls Razors, Ltd. made several models with variations based solely on casing material, finish and shape. The earliest models have a pebble-finish metal case. The nickel-plated Imperial No. 2 is the most common, along with the silver-plated Imperial which was packaged with a hard leatherette storage box. During World War II, the case was made all aluminium. Older razors, pre-1930, do not have a Greek key pattern on the case. A gold-plated case was made before 1930, but is very rare. The two main shape variations were the "standard" Imperial which had a flat boxy shape with rounded corners and the Viscount which had a softer profile with shaped sides and rounded corners.

The case design evolved to a pattern of parallel zig-zag lines. Later razors have a three-row Greek key design and with "The Whetter" trademark near the end of the case. These cases measure 2 3/4 × 6 inches. The Viscount case design has a single Greek key row. The corners of the case are more rounded (about a 5/8-inch radius) than previous Rolls. The case dimensions are 2 7/8 × 6 1/4 inches.

By 1951, Rolls was also advertising the Viceroy Electric Dry shaver, or, the ad said, if you have "no electricity ... ask for the Viceroy non-electric mechanical dry shaver ... Press the lever and shave!" This was a mechanical version of the dry shaver that was operated by repeatedly squeezing a lever on the handle.

The Rolls Razor was successful enough that it had a similar British competitor, The Darwin, made by Darwins Ltd. (or Darwin, Ltd.; both spellings were used), Fitzwilliam Works, Sheffield, England. US patents were filed in 1933 and issued in 1935. A British patent was issued in 1934. The Darwin case is longer and narrower than the Rolls. Darwin models include "Universal" and "De Luxe".

== Washing machines ==
After launching his washing machine business on the back of newspaper adverts, entrepreneur John Bloom bought the moribund shell of Rolls Razor Limited as a vehicle to grow his business.

Originally the machines were manufactured in the Netherlands, but later an assembly line was set up at the company's factory in Cricklewood, London, where prospective customers could view the process. On the back of a heavy advertising campaign, and prices 50% below those found in shops retailing products by Hoover and Hotpoint, the machines were offered on hire purchase in light of the British Government relaxing many restrictions on this type of finance. By 1962, Rolls had secured 10% of the market and was the third largest manufacturer of washing machines. Keen to further expand the business, it merged with the Colston company, founded by ex-Hoover director Sir Charles Colston, which made compact dishwashers, and concluded a deal to distribute Prestcold refrigerators.

The company listed on the London Stock Exchange in mid-1962, at a price of 20s ($3.50) per share, with the price doubling in weeks. By the end of 1963, the company was selling over 200,000 machines a year. Marketing itself as Rolls-Prestcold, in 1963 it became the first commercial sponsor of the Royal Windsor Horse Show.

But the retailers and UK manufacturers were unhappy, and reduced their prices considerably to create the so-called Washing Machine War, between direct sales and retailers. In response Bloom was forced to increase his advertising costs just as sales began to fall, and was then hit by the 1964 postal strike which resulted in coupon returns drying up. Receipts from Rolls's customer hire purchase agreements were underwritten by banker Sir Isaac Wolfson, who by mid-1964 had bankrolled the company with an £8 million loan. Spotting trouble, Sir Isaac withdrew his support and sped the downfall.

With Bloom suspected of malpractice, the company's shares were suspended at 1s in mid-July 1964, before the company announced it would be placed into voluntary liquidation. The speed of withdrawal caused the company to be mentioned during questions in the House of Commons, UK. Liquidators found thousands of unsold washing machines in warehouses, and after entering to make their report to shareholders to a chorus of Handel's "Dead March" from Saul, reported that the company had assets of $2,100,000, with creditors totalling $11 million, including: Tallent Engineering $2,400,000; Pressed Steel Company $1,200,000, and Hawker Siddeley $151,000, for a DH.125 company plane.

Bloom came in for heavy criticism regarding his direct sales business practice. The London Stock Exchange resultantly asked member companies for more frequent and more thorough financial statements, which it formalised in later legislation. Rolls Razor was subsequently a respondent company in a House of Lords judicial decision called Barclays Bank Ltd v Quistclose Investments Ltd. The case was won by Quistclose Investments. This was a landmark case which created the concept known as a Quistclose trust.

Manufacture continued with machines built by the engineering company Tallent (who built the company's dishwashers), who re-branded them as such briefly, but by 1965 the machines were marketed as Colstons before the appliance division of Tallent was taken over by the Italian firm Ariston in 1979.

== See also ==
- Richard Reader Harris
- Thiers Issard
- Straight razor
- Safety razor
- Timeline of historic inventions
