= Oxfordshire History Centre =

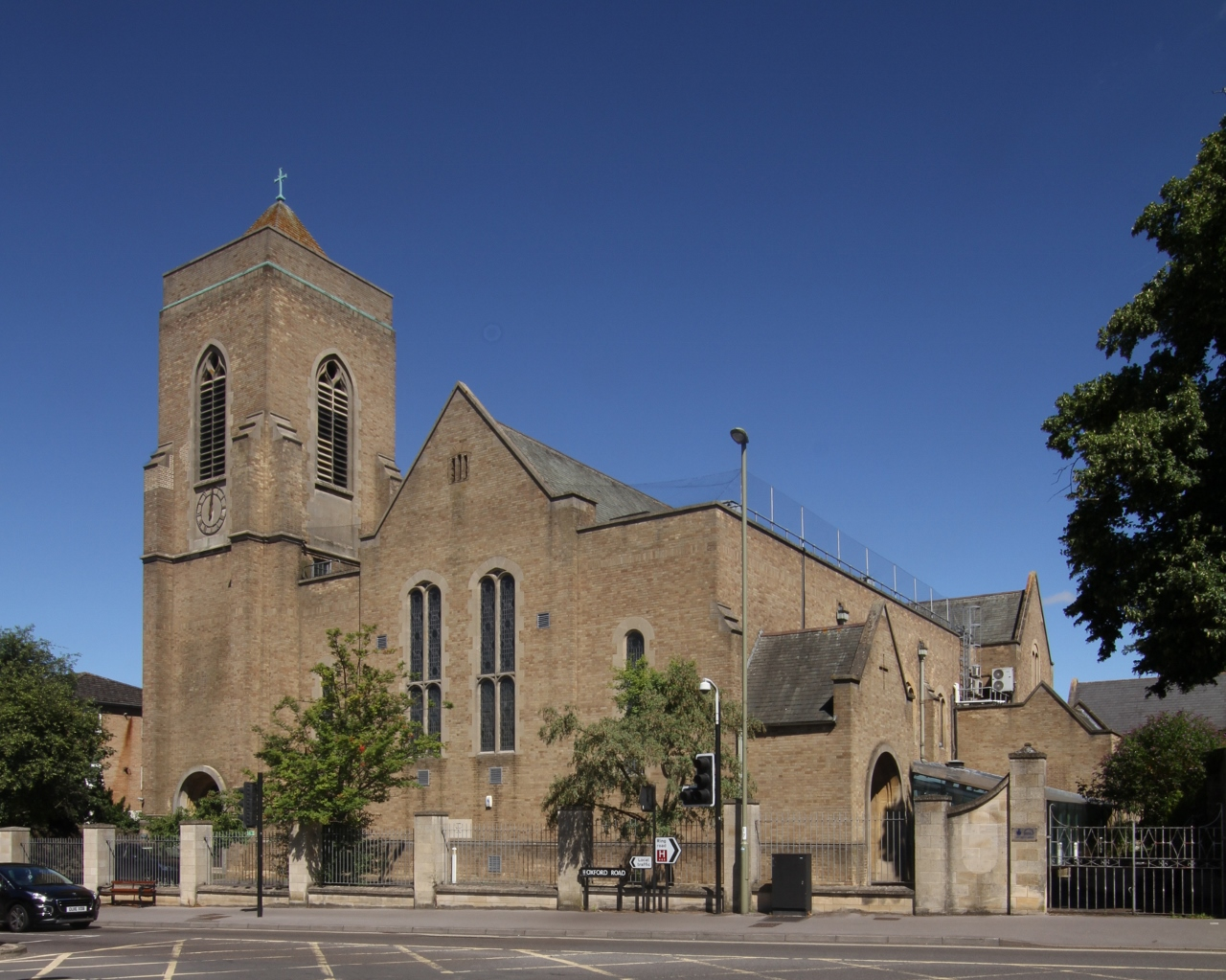
Oxfordshire History Centre in Oxford Road, Cowley, Oxford, seen from the south from Between Towns Road

Oxfordshire History Centre is in the former Church of England parish church of St Luke, Cowley, Oxford, England. It collects, preserves and makes available the records of the historic county of Oxfordshire. It holds original records and printed material from the 12th to 21st century, which are available for all to see free of charge. It is owned and run by Oxfordshire County Council. It is recognised as a place of deposit by The National Archives.

== History ==
An office was established by Oxfordshire County Council in 1935 and was in County Hall in Oxford. Its remit was to collect historic documents related to the history of Oxfordshire as well as the records of Oxfordshire County Council itself. These collections were significantly enlarged when the Bodleian Library transferred responsibility for the diocesan, archdeaconry and parish collections of Oxfordshire to the Oxfordshire Record Office in 1984.

As the collections grew, storage space in County Hall was augmented by a series of remote stores. However, by the 1990s increasing visitor numbers as well as an acute need for more storage space meant that a new building was essential. The Diocese of Oxford offered the County Council the redundant parish church of St Luke in Cowley and this building, built at the behest of Lord Nuffield as a place of worship for the workers in his Cowley factories was converted with the support of the Heritage Lottery Fund, Paul Getty and other donors. The bells, cast by Gillett & Johnston in 1938, were sold to the Keltek Trust and eventually were incorporated into a new ring of bells at Christ Church, Hampstead, Greater London.

The new Office opened to the public in November 2000.

In 2011 the former Oxfordshire Record Office, Centre for Oxfordshire Studies and the Oxfordshire Health Archives were merged into one comprehensive history service and renamed Oxfordshire History Centre.

As of 26 August 2026, the current History Service Manager is Daniel Williams.

== Visitor information ==
Oxfordshire History Centre is open to visitors.

== Holdings ==
Oxfordshire History Centre holds a wide range of records which may be of use in family history, local history or other types of research:

- Local administrative records of the county, including the Quarter Sessions, County Council, District Councils, Parish Councils, Poor Law Union and Borough records.
- Oxford City Archives
- Records of the Church of England including diocesan and archdeaconry records, registers of baptism, marriages and burials. Probate, church court and school records and poor law papers.
- Nonconformist church records
- Business and organisation records
- Solicitors' records
- Estate and family records
- Local newspapers
- Historic and Ordnance Survey mapping
- Local Studies reference collection of books, periodicals, directories and other published materials
- Photographic and oral history collections

The Oxfordshire History Centre encourages organisations and private individuals to deposit relevant records concerning Oxfordshire.

Catalogues can be accessed online on Heritage Search, Picture Oxon, National Archives Discovery, or in the searchroom.

== Information about other records ==
On site, the records are cared for by are professionally qualified archivists, a conservator, and local studies librarians. However, relevant records are also elsewhere:

- Modern Oxfordshire County Council records. These are held by the Information Management Team based in County Hall, Oxford.
- Vale of White Horse Records. This area was originally part of the historic county of Berkshire before the 1974 local government reorganisation. As a result, many of the historic records are kept at Berkshire Record Office.
