= David Abell (businessman) =

British businessman and sharedealer (born 1942)

- Born: December 15, 1942; United Kingdom
- Education: Leeds University (BA Economics); London School of Economics (Diploma in Business Administration)
- Occupations: Businessman, sharedealer
- Known for: Owner and chairman of Suter Plc; Chairman of Jourdan Plc
- Spouse: Juliana (third wife)
- Children: Four sons and one daughter (from previous marriages)
- Parents: Leonard Abell; Irene Abell

John David Abell (born 15 December 1942), known as David Abell, is a British businessman and sharedealer. In the late 1960s and 1970s he was an executive at British Leyland. He was owner and chairman of Suter Plc. from 1978 to 1996, and from 1997 he has been chairman of Jourdan Plc.

== Career ==
Early in his career, Abell worked for Ford (1962–65), AEI (1965–67), and First National Finance Corporation (1972–73).

=== Leyland ===
Abell joined British Leyland in 1968. He was a senior executive at Leyland, including acting as treasurer and sitting on the board. He was chairman and chief executive of Prestcold, part of Leyland, and he became managing director and chief executive of Leyland Australia in July 1974 to oversee the closure of the Waterloo manufacturing plant and the end of production of the Leyland P76 and Marina cars. He returned to the UK in mid-1975 to become managing director of British Leyland's Special Products Division (renamed SP Industries), He was made managing director of BL Commercial Vehicles in 1978. He left BL in 1981, when his interests in Suter Group's purchase of Prestcold from BL became a conflict of interest.

=== Suter ===
Abell bought Suter Electrical in 1978 and was the chairman of Suter from 1981 until 1996, when it was sold to Ascot Holdings (now part of Dow). The DTI investigated his sharedealings in the late 1980s; it found no wrongdoing but noted misleading statements.

During Abell's ownership of Suter, the business acquired a number of divisions of the former SP Industries (Leyland Special Products) of which he had been managing director, including Prestcold and the Lyne Printers subsidiary of the Nuffield Press.

=== Jourdan ===
From May 1997 he has been the chairman of Jourdan, former makers of the Corby Trouser Press, when he replaced Keith Whitten. He is close to managing director Bob Morris, who he has worked with for decades. Abell withdrew Jourdan from the Alternative Investment Market in 2009. His family owned about 30% of Jourdan in the 2000s, and his family gained overall control of the company in October 2011.

=== Share dealing ===
He briefly owned shares in Coffee Republic during 2002. He is a director of St. Helen's Private Equity Plc.

== Personal life ==
He is the son of Leonard and Irene. He is married to Juliana, his third wife, and has four sons and a daughter from previous marriages. He gain a BA in economics from Leeds University and has Diploma in Business Administration from the London School of Economics. He is a fan and non-executive director of the Leicester Tigers rugby club, and he was a director of Leicester City football club in 2002. His is also a race horse owner, including Collier Hill.
