= Cowley, Oxfordshire =

Area of Oxford, England

Coordinates: 51.733°N 1.215°W

Cowley
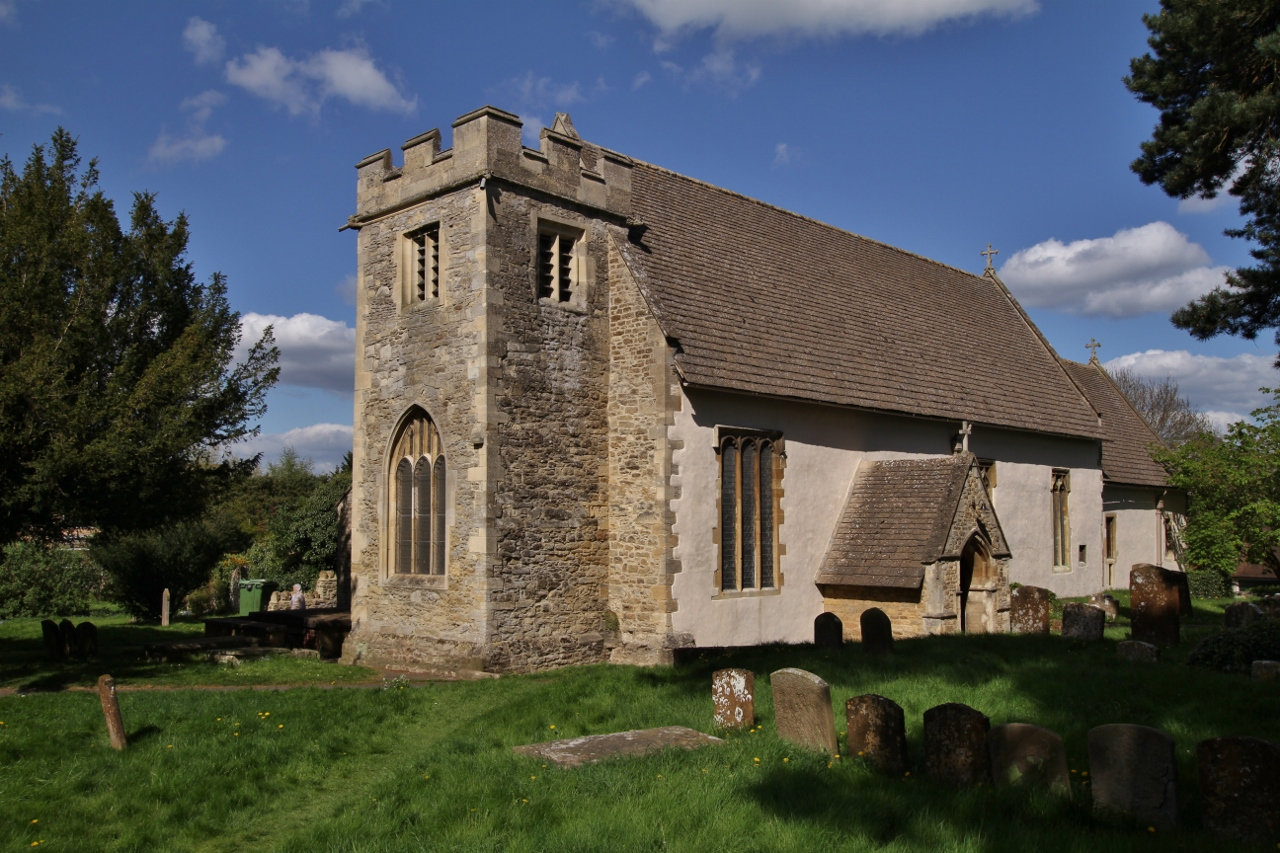
- St James' Church

- Location within Oxfordshire
- OS grid reference: SP543040
- Civil parish: unparished
- District: Oxford
- Shire county: Oxfordshire
- Region: South East
- Country: England
- Sovereign state: United Kingdom
- Post town: Oxford
- Postcode district: OX4
- Dialling code: 01865
- Police: Thames Valley
- Fire: Oxfordshire
- Ambulance: South Central
- UK Parliament: Oxford East

Cowley (/ˈkaʊlɪ/) is a residential and industrial area in the south-east of Oxford, in the county of Oxfordshire, England. Cowley's neighbours are Rose Hill and Blackbird Leys to the south, Headington to the north and the villages of Horspath and Garsington across fields to the east. Internationally, Cowley is best known for its automotive industry - historically it was the home of the car manufacturer Morris (later absorbed into British Leyland, then the Rover Group), which has now evolved into Mini.

== History ==
The Cowley area has been inhabited since Roman times. The line of a Roman road runs north-south along the eastern edge of Cowley. It linked a Roman town at Dorchester-on-Thames with a Roman military camp at Alchester near Bicester. A road called Roman Way follows part of its route. It is behind the Mini car factory, starting opposite the Stagecoach in Oxfordshire bus garage. Cowley coalesced from the former villages of Middle Cowley, Temple Cowley and Church Cowley (around St James church), though the ancient parish of Cowley covered much of the area now known as East Oxford. The western portion of the original parish of Cowley was split off and became part of the city of Oxford in 1889, and was given the name of Cowley St John, though today it is often called the Cowley Road area, after the road across the fields from Oxford to Cowley villages.

The term Cowley today usually refers to the remainder of Cowley (the parish of Cowley St James where the original Cowley villages stood), which became part of the city of Oxford in 1928. However, because the settlements of Cowley were situated within the larger Cowley parishes, there are still some modern contexts (such as the Cowley Fathers mentioned below) when the term "Cowley" is used to refer to other areas in East Oxford outside of Cowley proper. Cowley was a manor from Medieval times, and a 16th-century manor house stood on Oxford Road near the corner with Hollow Way. In 1139, Matilda of Boulogne founded Temple Cowley here for the Knights Templar. The house became part of the Oxford Military College which was built on its grounds in the 19th century. In 1864, the Wycombe Railway between High Wycombe and Oxford was built through Cowley, but at this time the village was so small that the railway company did not provide it with a station.

Cowley St James C of E school, situated on Beauchamp Lane adjacent to the church, was established in 1834 and continued to operate as a primary school until 1975. Its most famous pupil was William Morris, later Lord Nuffield, who founded Morris Motors which was the source of a great deal of local employment leading to substantial growth in the area. A public house is named after him located in the nearby Templar Square shopping centre. Another well-known pupil of the school was the actress Dame Maggie Smith.

In 1859, the vicar, Richard Meux Benson, erected a new parish church dedicated to St. John the Evangelist. In 1865 two priests joined Benson in Cowley to begin community life under the name of the Mission Priests of St. John the Evangelist with Benson as the superior. In 1866 the Society of St. John the Evangelist, a Church of England religious order, was founded near Cowley Road in the parish of Cowley. SSJE was the first long-lasting Anglican religious order for men since the Reformation. The members were frequently known as the "Cowley Fathers".

In 1868 the Eddison and Nodding Company factory was founded in Cowley. John Allen bought it in 1897 and renamed it the Oxford Steam Plough Company. He later renamed it again as John Allen and Sons, and diversified into manufacturing other agricultural and horticultural machinery including the successful Allen Scythe powered by a small Villiers petrol engine. The works closed in the early 1980s, and the Templars Shopping Park formerly known as John Allen Centre retail park has since been built on the site.

The Oxford Military College bought the former Cowley Middle Class School in 1876. The College hall, a former manor house, was built in the early 17th century. The Chapel of 1870 was designed by the architect Edward George Bruton. An east wing designed by Sir Thomas Graham Jackson was added in 1877. The Oxford Military College closed in 1896, developed from 1912 by William Morris as the Cowley plant. During the 1960s, the centre of Cowley was demolished and replaced with Templars Square shopping centre (previously it had been known as "Cowley Centre", and sometimes still is). In the same decade the railway between Princes Risborough and Oxford closed, but the track between Kennington Junction and Cowley remains open for freight in and out of the car factory.

Between 1980 and 1992 the headquarters of the United Kingdom Warning and Monitoring Organisation (UKWMO) was located in a converted barracks building at Cowley Barracks on James Wolfe Road, Cowley. The UKWMO was the organisation responsible for initiating the four-minute warning in the event of a nuclear attack on the UK and was disbanded at the end of the Cold War. Co-located with HQUKWMO was the Headquarters of No 3 Oxford Group Royal Observer Corps whose underground protected nuclear bunker at the Cowley site opened in 1965. Parts of the bunker were demolished in 1995, however most of it was refurbished including the air filtration systems. The site now belongs to Oxford Brookes University who built student accommodation on the site, and now use the former bunker as a storage facility making it the only student halls in the country with its own nuclear shelter.

In 1921 the civil parish had a population of 2790. On 1 April 1929 the parish was abolished and merged with St Giles and St John.

=== Morris Motors ===
The Cowley area was transformed after 1912 when William Morris bought the former Oxford Military College and moved Morris Motors Limited into it from its former premises in Oxford. He expanded into "The Old Tin Shed" in 1914 and then into a huge complex of purpose-built production lines in Cowley, as Morris pioneered Henry Ford-style mass production in the UK. The Great Western Railway, which had taken over the Wycombe Railway, opened a station called Morris Cowley to serve some of the thousands of workers commuting to the factory. In 1933, a goods yard was built beside the line to bring supplies into the factory and take completed vehicles away. This yard still exists and serves the current vehicle-manufacturing plant, though the railway beyond has long been lifted.

From the 1920s through to the 1960s, Cowley expanded into a huge industrial centre. In the Great Depression many people left areas of high unemployment such as South Wales and moved to the Cowley area to work in Cowley's factories. Large areas of housing were built and rented out to the migrants. Florence Park was one area built in the 1920s for a private landlord to rent to new workers. The houses looked nice but they were poorly built and maintained, until the tenants held a rent strike and forced the landlord to make repairs. Most Florence Park houses are now owner-occupied, and the area's tree-lined roads are now a popular neighbourhood in which to live. In World War II the Morris factory produced many de Havilland Tiger Moth training aeroplanes for the war effort and there was also the No 1 Metal and Produce Recovery Depot run by the Civilian Repair Organisation to handle crashed or damaged aircraft and even the wreckage of enemy aircraft was processed here. Paul Nash was inspired to paint Totes Meer based on sketches he made of the recovery depot.

Despite successive company mergers and name changes, "Morris's" is still often used as the name of the car factory to this day. In 1952, Morris Motors became part of the British Motor Corporation (BMC), in 1968 BMC became British Leyland, in the 1980s the group was known as Austin Rover, in the 1990s it was Rover Group and since 2001 the factory has been owned by BMW. But the name "Morris's" is ingrained in local culture and speech habits, particularly amongst older inhabitants. By the early 1970s, over 20,000 people worked in Cowley at the vast Morris Motors and Pressed Steel Fisher plants. Unipart is also a major employer in Cowley, with premises next to the car factory. In later years Morris Motors and Pressed Steel became one company. Subsequently the Morris's site was closed down, demolished, and redeveloped as the Oxford Business Park.

== Cowley today ==
The car factory is known today as Plant Oxford; it is now owned by BMW and has been extensively redeveloped. It remains the largest industrial employer in Oxfordshire, employing more than 4,300 people. The plant was set up in 1926 by a consortium including William Morris and the Budd Company of America, and was adjacent to the Morris Motors factory. Morris and the Budd Company both pulled out of the consortium, and the plant became an independent supplier of bodies and tooling to Morris and other car manufacturers across the world. The company also produced the Prestcold refrigerators. When BMW sold the Rover Group, they decided to retain the Pressed Steel Fisher site and transfer the Mini from Longbridge to Cowley, enabling the Longbridge site to continue to produce all the Rover products. BMW retained ownership of the Cowley plant, formerly Pressed Steel, to build the all-new Mini that was launched in the spring of 2001. It has been the best selling car to be built at the plant since the Maestro and Montego in the 1980s. The Morris Motors factory expanded with factory complexes on both sides of the Oxford Road. Although Morris started his original work in Longwall Street in the city centre, the Cowley site on the outskirts of the city quickly became the production site for high volume production.

It was the original base of Morris cars when the marque was founded in 1912, and production continued at the factory until 1982, with models including the Morris Minor, Morris Oxford, Riley Motor and Wolseley Motors cars. The Morris marque was not abandoned until 1984, when production of the Longbridge-built Morris Ital and development of the Morris Marina finished. The factory then became the production facility for the Maestro, Montego and the Princess Range. Production continued with the facility totally given over to production of the Rover 600 and Rover 800. These models were replaced by the Rover 75 in late 1998, but BMW broke up the Rover Group in 2000 and Rover 75 production moved to Longbridge. The original Morris Motor sites were flattened and a technology park has since been created on the site. The former Nuffield Press site including the former Oxford Military College buildings was redeveloped in the late 1990s into housing. The business park has attracted a large David Lloyd Leisure centre and offices of numerous companies including the European headquarters of Harley-Davidson Motorcycles and the headquarters of international aid charity Oxfam GB. Cowley is an ethnically diverse community, with significant black and South Asian communities.

== Sports and leisure ==
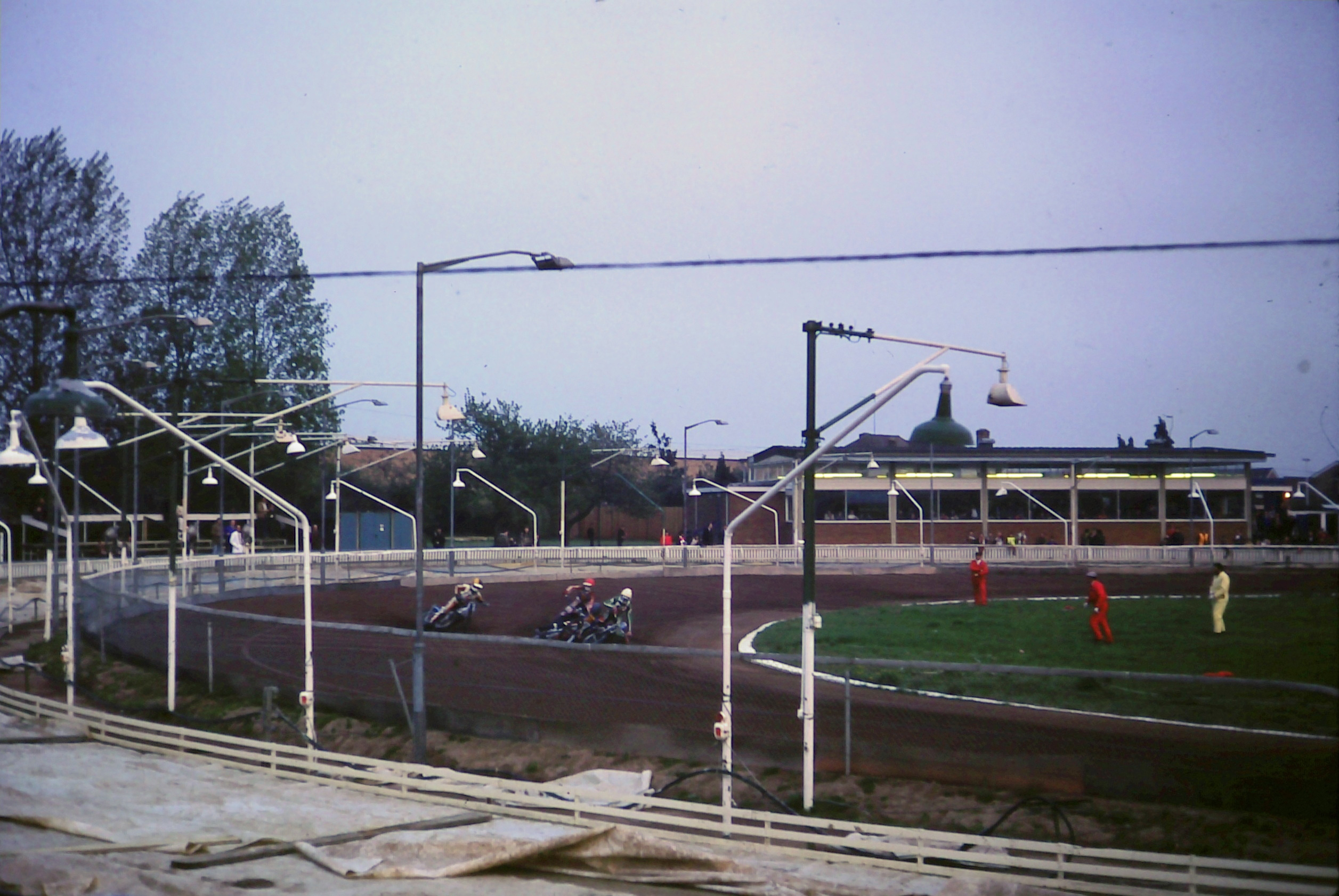
Speedway racing at Cowley in 1980

Cowley has a strong sporting tradition. In 1938 Oxford Stadium was built to host the sport of greyhound racing. In 1939 motorcycle speedway moved to Oxford Stadium. After a few years Oxford's speedway team were named Oxford Cheetahs, a name they still bear today. Temple Cowley Pools in Temple Road was a public swimming and gymnasium complex run by Oxford City Council which closed in December 2014 for redevelopment as housing. Its main pool was 25 metres long. It was built on the site of part of a former Knights Templar estate. Opposite the site of the former pool is the band hall of the City of Oxford Silver Band and next door to it stands Cowley Library. Oxfordshire Record Office occupies the former St Luke's church nearby. Morris Motors Athletic & Social Club in nearby Crescent Road has a large sports ground and club house.

Until 2009 on Watlington Road, opposite the Mini factory, stood Johnson's Café, which fed thousands of Morris Motors workers in the past. It was founded decades ago by Reginald Johnson and until its final day its interior was decorated with bold murals of early speedway stars. Reginald's sons Aubrey and Len took over after the Second World War. Len's son Joe Johnson was an international motocross star in the 1960s until he settled down to run the cafe alongside Aubrey and his son, Andrew, after Len's death. After Aubrey's death in the 1980s the cafe was run by Andrew and Joey to the end. This cafe suffered an armed robbery on 16 January 2008 and closed in 2009. The building is now occupied by Oxford Spin & Fitness centre.

== Education ==
Schools serving Cowley include Greyfriars Catholic School and Oxford Spires Academy.

== In popular culture ==
Cowley is a principal setting in the novel The Alteration by Kingsley Amis, set in an alternative reality where the Protestant Reformation never occurred. Cowley was the site of the Holy Victory in the War of English Succession (where 'Henry the Abominable' attempted to seize the throne from his nephew Stephen II, resulting in a papal crusade). As a result, it was renamed Coverley and made the ecclesiastical capital of England, surpassing the secular capital of London in terms of importance.

On his 1992 tour of England (heard on the posthumously released Shock and Awe album), the comedian and satirist Bill Hicks stated that he had found the "Alabama of Britain" whilst attending a radio interview in Cowley.

Cowley is referenced in the lyrics of the song "Zorbing" by the British alternative indie folk band Stornoway: "Been Zorbing through the streets of Cowley".

Young detective Endeavour Morse is based at Cowley Road police station in the Inspector Morse prequel Endeavour.

== Notable people ==
- Gladys Mitchell, writer, born April 21, 1901
- Stornoway, musical band
- Ronnie Barker, comedian, actor, writer, born September 25, 1929

== Sources ==
- Lobel, Mary D, ed. (1957). Victoria County History: A History of the County of Oxford: Volume 5: Bullingdon Hundred. pp. 76–96.
- Sherwood, Jennifer; Pevsner, Nikolaus (1974). The Buildings of England: Oxfordshire. Harmondsworth: Penguin Books. pp. 340–344. ISBN 0-14-071045-0.
