= John Bloom (businessman) =

British entrepreneur (1931–2019)

- Born: John Bloomstein; 8 November 1931; London, England
- Died: 3 March 2019 (aged 87)
- Education: Hackney Downs School
- Occupation: Businessman

Notes
- Rolls Razor

John Bloom (8 November 1931 – 3 March 2019) was a British entrepreneur, best known for his role in the "Washing Machine Wars" of 1962–64 when he drastically reduced prices by direct sales that cut out the retailers. His company Rolls Razor made great inroads into the market but several manufacturers obtained injunctions to stop them selling at below the fixed retail price. His operation was also hit by a long postal strike and the withdrawal of a major backer, forcing the company into liquidation. Bloom was a controversial figure whose aggressive techniques shook up a complacent market but who gave new power to the consumer. His often-repeated motto "it's no sin to make a profit" became the title of his memoirs.

== Early life and education ==
Bloom was born John Bloomstein in Hackney in London's East End on 8 November 1931 to Orthodox Jewish parents. Bloom's father, Sam, was born in Austria and was a tailor. His mother Dora was of Sephardic background. He attended Hackney Downs School which he left aged 16.

== RAF ==
He then tried a number of jobs before National Service in the Royal Air Force. Bloom was initially posted to No.3 Radio School at RAF Compton Bassett near Calne, Wiltshire for training as a signalman. It was there that he started his first enterprise. He noticed that a local coach company, Cards Coaches of Devizes, provided coaches to the RAF under contract. On Saturday afternoons these took airmen from the base to London on 36-hour passes. With a friend who ran a coach company in Stoke Newington, Bloom undercut Cards Coaches by half. Cards took Bloom to court but the judge sided with Bloom who declared that "it's no sin to make a profit", which later became his motto. Bloom was later posted to Bletchley Park and then Bush House in the Aldwych, London, on the grounds that his mother was unwell; she died some years later from a form of multiple sclerosis.

== Washing machines ==
After the RAF, he initially worked as a salesman for a company selling Dutch-made washing machines door-to-door. After a while, he decided to start his own company and tried to buy machines from the Netherlands. With little money or credit this was difficult, but eventually he made a deal with a factory in Utrecht. He advertised them under the name "Electromatic". They were twin-tub machines with a washer and separate spin-drier, priced at 39 guineas (equivalent to £40.95). This was about half the price of shop-bought machines.

In 1958 Bloom placed an advert in the Daily Mirror offering home demonstrations of washing machines. This generated 7,000 responses via postal coupons. Bloom's unorthodox marketing, direct sales to the public and low prices quickly gave him 10% of the market taken from the main manufacturers Hoover and Hotpoint. He was soon selling 500 machines a week, financed largely through affordable hire purchase agreements.

Bloom then realised that he could cut overheads by manufacturing in Britain. He did a deal with the then moribund Rolls Razor Company to make 25,000 twin-tub washing machines. He later merged the two companies, becoming Managing Director with a majority of the shares.

In early 1962 he formed an alliance with the Colston company, expanding into dishwashers. In September 1962 he took over sales of the Prestcold Refrigerator business and immediately the newly named Rolls Prestcold cut prices to half of those sold by retail outlets. In retaliation in October 1962 the Retail Trade Retailers association launched a £100,000 campaign to combat direct selling. Hotpoint immediately pledged £10,000 towards the campaign and other manufacturers followed suit. This was known in the media as the Washing Machine War. A Rolls washing machine is featured in the Science Museum London in the "Birth of High-Tech Britain" Section.

He then moved into holidays with an exclusive deal to market the country of Bulgaria in the UK. He sold a two-week all-in holiday at £59, once again cutting out travel agent retailers and reducing the price by more than half. The Bulgarian Black Sea coast was warm and sunny and littered with modern functional hotels. Bulgaria was a communist country and part of the Soviet bloc. It needed western currency and was prepared to sell Bloom cheap hotel accommodation and food in return. Later, after the washing machine collapse, the Royal Arsenal Co-operative Society formed Balkan Holidays with the Bulgarian state-owned tourist organisation.

The company was listed on the London Stock Exchange in mid-1962 at 20 shillings per share; and shared doubled in price later that year. By the end of 1963, Rolls-Colston was selling over 200,000 machines a year. However it was running out of people to buy the machines.

== Collapse ==
Bloom's business had expanded rapidly, relying on the most aggressive marketing campaign of his time. In 1963 Bloom was the UK's largest press advertiser and a household name in the early 1960s.

Bloom appeared in a debate on BBC's That Was The Week That Was in November 1963 with Bernard Levin. The Sunday Telegraph had reported on the debate that Bloom had been the victor and it was the first time Bernard Levin had lost a debate. Bloom had come across as the housewife's friend; a pal of working men; the scourge of the City and enemy of the Establishment and resale price maintenance. Bloom was symbol of free enterprise. The listing of Rolls Razor on the Stock Exchange made Bloom a millionaire with a Rolls-Royce Phantom and a flat in Park Lane, and he rented the Villa La Fiorentina on Cap Ferrat on The French Riviera as a sales incentive scheme for his top salesmen to visit for holidays. Later he purchased a 376-ton 150-foot motor yacht Ariane for $1 million, which was sold after the crash to Charles Revson the head of the Revlon Company, and later to Kirk Kerkorian, and finally was owned by Adnan Khashoggi for 20 years.

But the retailers and UK manufacturers were unhappy with Bloom's direct sales methods of cutting out the retailer, and his two-for-one schemes giving a free refrigerator when you bought a washing machine. They didn't like his efforts to abolish Resale Price Maintenance by opening discount stores which cut prices on established makes. Morphy Richards obtained an injunction against Rolls to prevent them selling at below the fixed retail price and many others followed suit.

In March 1964 conventional manufacturers reduced their prices considerably to create another "Washing Machine War". Bloom was forced to increase advertising costs just as sales began to fall. He was then hit by an 11-week postal strike which prevented coupon returns. Moreover, receipts from Rolls's customers' hire-purchase agreements had been underwritten by banker Sir Isaac Wolfson, and by mid-1964 Wolfson was funding Bloom with a $28 million loan. Spotting trouble, Wolfson withdrew support. The company's shares were suspended at $0.15 in mid-July 1964 it was placed into voluntary liquidation.

The Economist said at the time: "As the wreckage is exposed it is easy to forget what a lasting impression Mr. Bloom made on the retailing of household durables in this country. Before his arrival manufacturers tried to sell at the highest possible prices the appliances they found it most convenient to make, competing mainly on advertising claims of better performance and new technical tricks. Over a time the consumer gets more performance for his money, at each conventional price level, but what he did not get was a chance to buy a given grade of machine cheaper. Now after five years the customer is king of price as well as design."

The Financial Times wrote: "If the British economy is not sufficiently competitive, if established industry is too solidly wedded to price maintenance, we need more John Blooms not fewer of them'".

In a letter to The Times Ralph Harris, Director of the Institute of Economic Affairs wrote: "Mr. Bloom has already done more for economic growth in Britain than many of its verbal champions in the NEDC and elsewhere".

== Personal life ==
Bloom married Anne Cass in 1961 and they had two children. Bloom was well known for his social connections with celebrities and politicians. David Bowie credits Bloom as being central to his first record deal, when the then-unknown singer was invited to play at a party in Bloom's flat in Park Lane, and introduced to an agent. The Beatles, Shirley Bassey and Roy Thompson were amongst the many celebrities who attended his parties. Bloom was the first commercial sponsor in May 1963 of the Royal Windsor Horse Show, and on 18 March 1964, in the House of Lords, Lord Balfour of Inchrye called then Prime Minister Harold Wilson "a real super salesman, the John Bloom of political life".

== Later career ==
After his business problems, little was heard of Bloom for some time. He remained married to Anne. He published a book, It's No Sin to Make a Profit, in 1971. In 1972 Bloom started a medieval themed theatre restaurant called 1520 AD in St Martins Lane, London, which later expanded in the US, starting with an outlet in Anaheim in California.

In November 1972 the Anaheim restaurant was featured in Time magazine, which said "Old English fantasy, audience participation and a big helping of unabashed male chauvinism are on the menu". Time described Bloom as "a fast-talking Englishman", who "had been struck by comic Don Rickles' ability to insult Las Vegas audiences and make them love it", and proclaimed the restaurant a runaway success. From 1972 to 1978 1520 AD opened in leading hotels in major U.S. cities, but, as Bloom had commented to Time, there was an obvious limit to the amount of return business, and the restaurants ceased operations in 1978.

Bloom left the US and moved to Mallorca in Spain in 1979, where he later opened a piano bar in Plaza Gomilla in the centre of Palma. Several years later he sold his share to his partners. In 1984 he was featured and interviewed in the Sunday Times Colour Supplement 25th anniversary issue. He was later involved as a consultant for multi-national companies, primarily in merchandising and corporate sponsorship. Bloom is acknowledged by Tom Bower, the author of No Angel: The Secret Life of Bernie Ecclestone, as arranging the first meeting between Bower and Ecclestone in late 2009.

== Death ==
John Bloom died in Marbella, Spain on 3 March 2019.

== See also ==
- Richard Reader Harris
