= Nuffield Press =

British publisher and printer

The Nuffield Press Ltd
- Logo in 2011
- Industry: Publishing & printing
- Founded: August 1925; 100 years ago
- Defunct: June 2011; 15 years ago
- Fate: Went into administration
- Headquarters: Cowley, Oxford (until 1994); Abingdon (1994–2011)
- Key people: William Morris, 1st Viscount Nuffield (founder)
- Products: User manuals, service guides, magazines, promotional materials
- Revenue: £6.7 million (2011)
- Number of employees: 67 (2011)
- Parent: Morris Motors Limited (1925–1943); The Nuffield Organization (1943–1968); British Leyland (1968–1986); Maxwell Communication Corporation (1986–1992); Reed Elsevier (1992–2000); Independent (2000–2011)
- Website: www.nuffield.co.uk

Nuffield Press was a publisher and printer formed by William Morris (later Lord Nuffield) as part of his Nuffield Organization in 1925. It was formed to primarily produce promotional literature for the motor vehicle manufacturing divisions of the organization, and later expanded to printing of all types including owner's manuals, technical manuals, magazines, diaries, and posters.

== Formation ==
1927 edition of the Morris Owner magazine, the original publication of the Morris Oxford Press, later the Nuffield Press

William Morris had established his Morris Motors automobile company, and had already expanded into a group of marques by encouraging Cecil Kimber to market modified Morris cars under the MG brand. At the likely suggestion of Miles Thomas, who was in charge of sales and purchasing for Morris Motors, Morris decided to launch a magazine for owners and dealers.

During the post–World War I recession, Morris had acquired a number of distressed suppliers, in an example of vertical integration, and with this history, Morris was unable to find a supplier on suitable terms, due to the fear of becoming a tied supplier. Morris proceeded to produce the first edition of Morris Owner magazine in 1924 with an external supplier, but he could not get them to commit to becoming a regular supplier. The Morris Owner used a typeface very similar to the already popular Motor magazine, which Thomas had worked on previously to be being employed by Morris.

Morris owned large factory sites at the former Oxford Military College in Cowley, Oxford. The former college buildings where the press was located are listed buildings, and are to the West of the old Morris 'North Works'. Whilst the North and South Works are now both redeveloped, the old 'Body Plant' to the East is still used for car production, now operating as Plant Oxford producing the Mini for BMW.

In 1925, the majority of Morris car production had moved from the original factory in the old college buildings to the new custom built "big tin shed" factories built on the old parade ground. As a result, in August 1925, the Morris Oxford Press was started in the buildings recently vacated by the manufacturing operation. 100,000 shares were issued in the press, predominantly to the Morris Motor Company, with William Morris retaining share number 1.

Miles Thomas headed the operation from its inception. The press had initial work in printing the wide range of forms and dockets required by the factory itself. Its first run of promotional materials was a 17,000 run of two-colour postcards featuring the 12-model range of the company. The success of Thomas in running the press operation led to promotion by 1929, and promotions continued until he became Vice-Chairman of Morris Motors from 1942 to 1947.

The press expanded rapidly with 50 staff by the 1930s, along with equipment including a Miehle Vertical and a Monotype installation.

The Morris Owner magazine was a cornerstone of production, reaching a monthly print run of 20,000 copies, and this was supplemented by handbooks, repair manuals, stationery, labels, and factory paperwork. In August 1942, the title of Morris Owner was changed to Morris Owner and Nuffield Mail. There was another name change in late 1945, this time to New Outlook on Motoring. In March 1950 there was a re-launch as Motoring. In January 1969, this was replaced by High Road, whose brief life ended in December 1970.

In September 1942, the press was renamed the Nuffield Press, following the elevation of William Morris to Viscount Nuffield in 1938.

During World War II, the Morris factory was largely turned to war work, and the press likewise followed suit, becoming a war security zone, and producing documentation to help coordinate this new, important task.

By the 1950s, over 170 staff were on the payroll of the Nuffield Press, and further investment was made in capital equipment including a UK-first M.A.N. photolithography machine.

== Later ownership ==
The press continued as the Nuffield Organization was merged into the British Motor Corporation (BMC), then effectively becoming part of British Leyland in 1968. At its peak in the 1950s the Nuffield Press used more than 1,000 tonnes (2,200,000 lb) of paper a year producing sales literature, owners manuals, technical manuals, magazines, diaries and posters. The size of the portfolio meant that the production run for a single British International Motor Show involved over half a million machine runs.

It produced technical publications for BMC, and later the wider remit of British Leyland's entire product range. It later continued to produce materials for successor companies Austin Rover Group and Rover Group, as well as for external clients.

The press was arranged as a subsidiary of Leyland Special Products, later SP Industries, headquartered in Grantham, Lincolnshire, and later at Melton, Leicestershire, within the British Leyland group.

During the 1960s, the Special Products division acquired the Lyne and Sons printers in Grantham, which was later merged into the Nuffield Press. In 1976, the combined press, including the Lynes subsidiary, embarked on a £250k capital investment programme.

By 1977, the press employed 300 people at the Cowley site, had sales in excess of £3m, and was producing a wide range of products including full-colour printing of items like calendars.

In 1978, the press was moved from SP Industries to B L International.

The Lyne Printers division in Grantham was divested to Suter plc, owned by David Abell, former Managing Director of SP Industries and later of BL Commercial Vehicles. After a further sale, Lyne closed in 1990.

== Decline and administration ==
By the 1980s, the press became unprofitable, and was losing money for British Leyland, and in September 1986, despite being back at break-even, the Nuffield Press was sold by BL to press magnate Robert Maxwell. Initially sold to his Pergamon Holdings company, which already owned the Pergamon Press based on the other side of Oxford in at Headington Hill Hall. It later formed part of his Headington Holdings company under the Robert Maxwell Group. Under Maxwell, the company specialised in colour promotional and technical publications. At the time of the sale to Maxwell, there were 170 employees at the press.

The firm's employees were affected by the loss of pension funds by theft, which emerged in 1992 after Maxwell's death, with two-thirds of their pension fund missing.

Following the collapse of the Maxwell Group in early 1992, there was major restructuring with a sale to Reed Elsevier, who formed a new company (initially as Coleslaw 210 Ltd, before renaming as Nuffield Press Limited). A number of employees were made redundant without payment.

In 1994, then owner British Aerospace sold the Rover Group to BMW and, after 69 years, the press left the now BMW-owned Cowley site, and relocated to Nuffield Way, Abingdon. In 2000, the firm was subject to a management buyout for £850k, funded by HSBC Ventures. The Nuffield Press Limited was placed into administration on 27 June 2011, with the loss of 53 jobs (and 14 kept on pending any potential buyer). It was reported that the company had been in talks with Maurice Payne Colourprint, another struggling printer, but with no deal concluded, both went into administration in the same month. At the time the company went into receivership it employed approximately 67 people and had a turnover of £6.7 million according to PrintWeek magazine.

== Publications ==
The following publications were produced by the press:

- Morris Owner (later the Morris Owner and Nuffield Mail) for Morris Motors from 1924
- Worldwide for the Austin Motor Company aimed at dealers
- Outlook magazine, replacing the Morris Owner as more marques were added to the company.
- Transport Efficiency for commercial vehicle operators, from 1957
- News Exchange for the Nuffield Organization in the 1960s
- Motoring for the British Motor Corporation in the 1960s and replacing Outlook.
- Austin for BMC/Austin in the 1960s
- Rover for Rover Company in the 1960s
- Sidelights for the BMC Driver's Club

== In popular culture ==
The novel First impressions by Charmian Coates is set in the Nuffield Press at Cowley during the 1950s.
