= Cowley Road, Oxford =

Road in Oxford, England

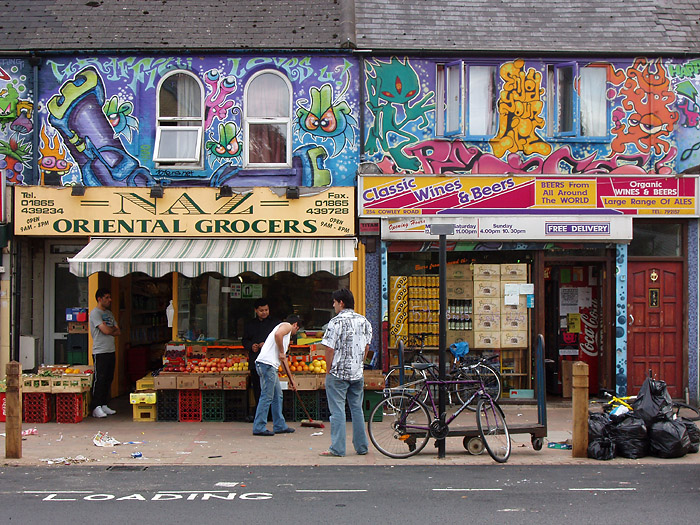
Two colourful Cowley Road shops

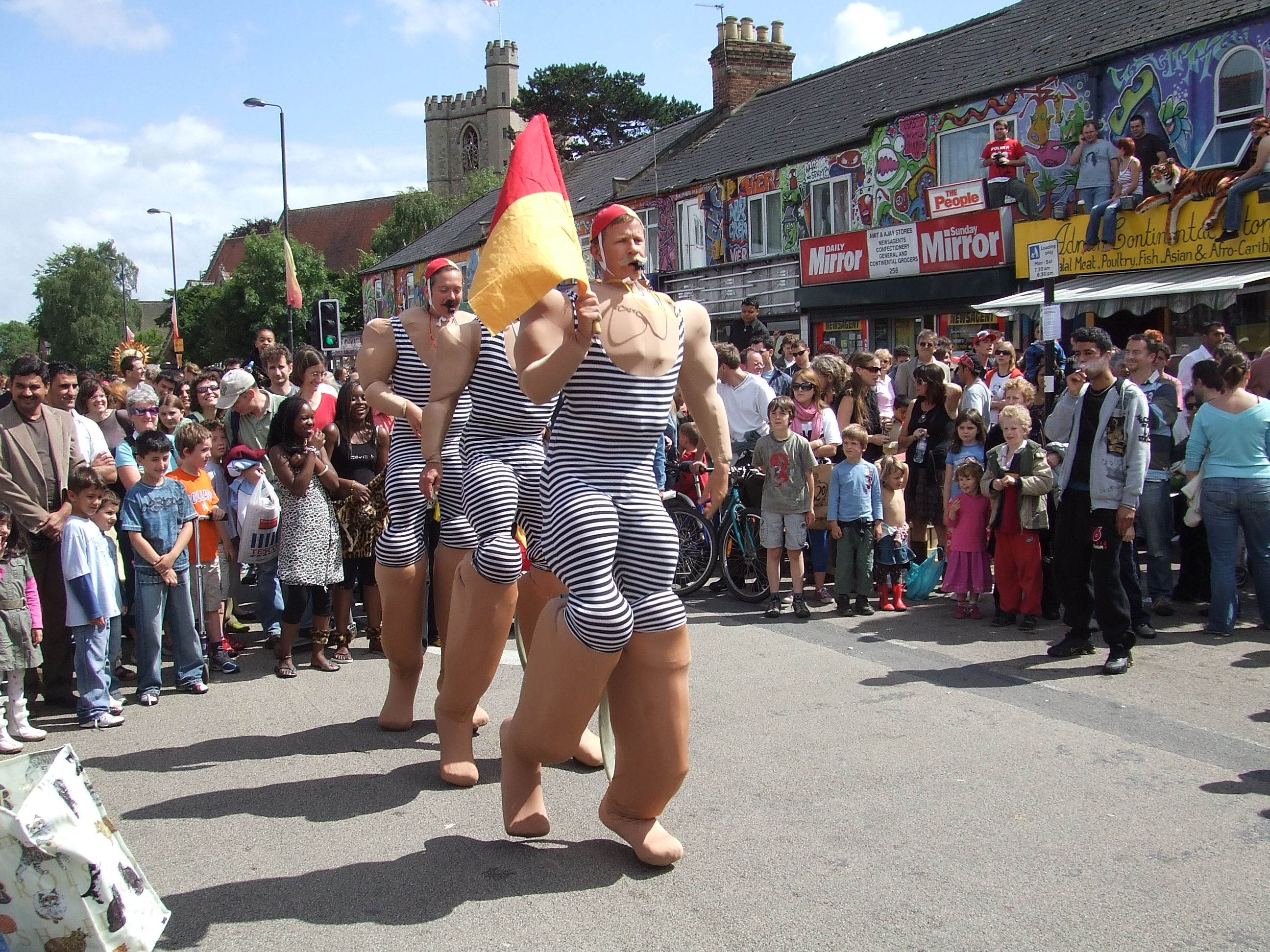
A scene from Cowley Road Carnival

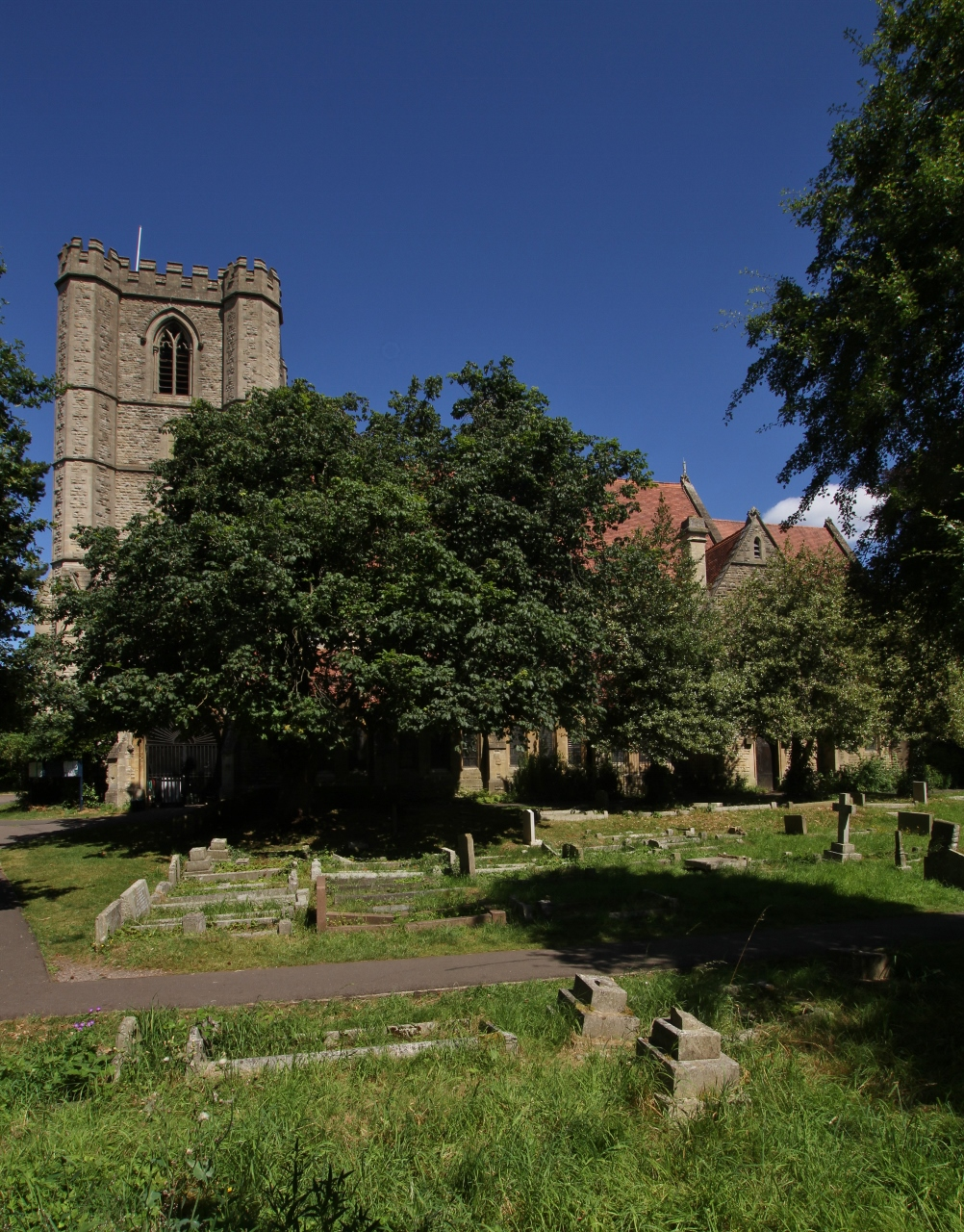
Saints Mary and John parish church, built in 1883

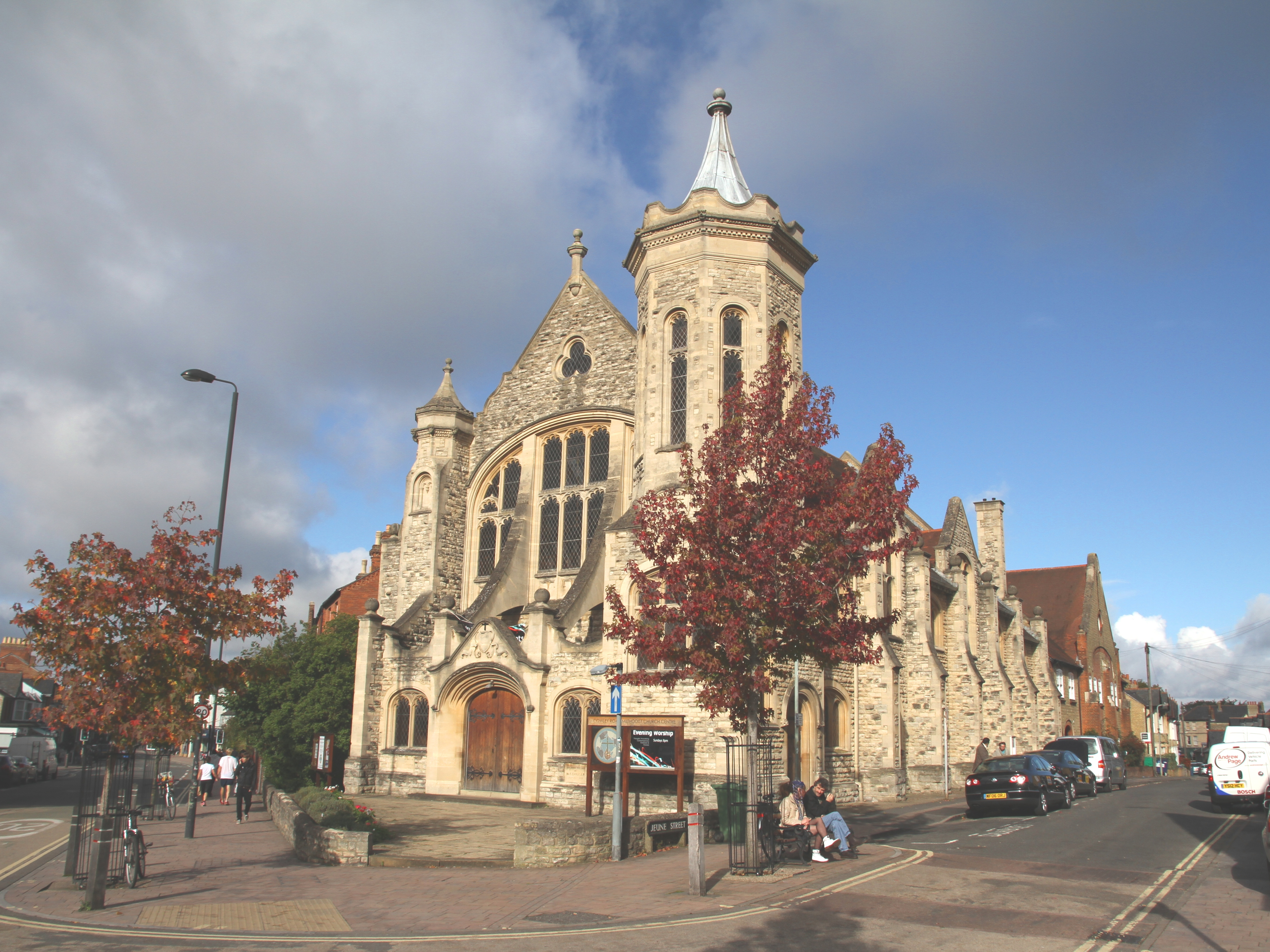
Cowley Road Methodist Church, built in 1903

Cowley Road is an arterial road in the city of Oxford, England, running southeast from near the city centre at The Plain near Magdalen Bridge, through the inner city area of East Oxford, and towards the industrial suburb of Cowley.

It is a section of the B480 road, which runs between Oxford and Henley-on-Thames. Cowley Road forms a terminal section of the B480 where it ends at The Plain, and becomes Oxford Road where it crosses the Boundary Brook and Marsh Road, before Temple Cowley (also known as Cowley). As such, Cowley is an area of Oxford distinct to Cowley Road, which is so named because it approaches Cowley. They are, however, often mistakenly conflated. Oxford also has another distinct Cowley Road, in Littlemore. Cowley Road in Littlemore approaches Cowley from the South, while the B480 Cowley Road approaches it from the North East.

Cowley Road is also the main shopping street of East Oxford, and in the evenings it is the area's main leisure district. The central shopping is at 51.746°N 1.232°W.

Cowley Road, like most of Oxford, has an ethnically and economically diverse population. This includes significant, long-standing South Asian and Afro-Caribbean communities, who have been joined more recently by East European, Chinese and African arrivals. Alongside these ethnic groups, East Oxford plays host to many members of the city's academic population, both undergraduate and academic staff, and is home to many politically active groups.

Cowley Road has high levels of both road traffic and pedestrian traffic, and space for both is limited. In 2005, Oxfordshire County Council invested about £1,000,000 from central government to re-model the busiest part of Cowley Road. The carriageway has been realigned and colourfully resurfaced, the pavements have been repaved, cycle lanes have been enhanced in some places and removed from others and in one section the speed limit has been reduced to 20 miles per hour (32 km/h).

== Music and culture ==
The Cowley Road area has played a prominent part in the Oxford music scene. A number of successful bands made their formative performances in local venues such as the O2 Academy Oxford (formerly known as The Zodiac), and The Bullingdon (formerly The Art Bar). A house party on the Cowley Road was the site to the UK band Foals' first ever gig. Famous Oxford bands have included Supergrass, Radiohead and Ride.

Cowley Road is also home to the Cowley Road Carnival, an annual event when the road is pedestrianised, and which features live music, static sound systems, a parade, and food from around the world. Cowley Road Carnival became an integral part of contemporary Oxford. Held on the first Sunday in July it celebrated the multicultural diversity of the city and regularly attracted around 50,000 visitors. The COVID-19 pandemic caused cancellation of the street carnival and in 2022 the organisers announced closure of the Carnival. After a 5 year break, the carnival returned in 2024, taking place on the 1st of September.

== See also ==
- CowleyRoad.org - an open access visual archive of the road
- Ultimate Picture Palace, Jeune Street, off Cowley Road
- Oxford Mutual Aid, based on Cowley Road

== Sources and further reading ==
- Attlee, James (2007). Isolarion: A Different Oxford Journey. Chicago: University of Chicago Press. ISBN 978-0-226-03093-7.
- Sherwood, Jennifer; Pevsner, Nikolaus (1974). Oxfordshire. The Buildings of England. Harmondsworth: Penguin Books. ISBN 0-14-071045-0.
- Skinner, Annie (2005). Cowley Road: A History. Signal Books. ISBN 1-904955-10-X.
