= Eames =

Eames is a surname which may refer to:

== People ==
- Aidan Eames, Irish solicitor and former politician (1982–1983)
- Alan D. Eames (1947–2007), American writer and anthropologist of beer
- Albert Eames (born 2005), English footballer
- Aled Eames (1921–1996), Welsh maritime historian
- Anna Eames (born 1990), American Paralympic swimmer
- Arthur Johnson Eames (1881–1969), American botanist and academic
- Benjamin T. Eames (1818–1901), American politician
- Billy Eames (born 1957), English former footballer
- Chalnessa Eames (born 1978), American ballet dancer
- Charles Eames (1907–1978), American designer, architect and filmmaker, husband and professional partner of Ray Eames
- Charles Eames (diplomat) (1812–1867), American lawyer and diplomat
- Charles Gladstone Eames (1860–1943), English tennis player
- Clare Eames (1894–1930), American actress
- David Eames (born 1937), English former first-class cricketer
- E. J. Eames (1813–1856), American writer and poet
- Elizabeth Eames (1918–2008), British archaeologist
- Elizabeth Jessup Eames (1813–1856), American writer
- Ellis Eames (1809–1882), American politician, first mayor of Provo, Utah
- Emma Eames (1865–1952), American operatic soprano
- Fidelma Healy Eames (born 1962), Irish former politician
- Francis L. Eames (1844–1912), American banker and president of the New York Stock Exchange
- Fred Eames, American billiards player, three-cushion billiards world champion in 1910)
- Geoffrey Eames (born 1945), Australian judge
- Haine Eames (born 2008), Australian soccer player
- Jack Eames (1922–2017), Australian rules footballer
- Jane Anthony Eames (1816–1894), American travel writer
- Jim Eames (1917–2010), Lord Mayor of Birmingham and magistrate
- John Eames (1686–1744), English Dissenting tutor
- Laura Emeline Eames Chase (1856–1917), née Eames, early American dentist, first female full member of the American Dental Association
- Marion Eames (1921–2007), Welsh novelist
- Mark Eames (born 1961), Hong Kong cricketer
- Netta Eames (1852–1944), American writer and magazine editor, early proponent and business manager of writer Jack London
- Owen Eames (born 2006), English footballer
- Ray Eames (1912–1988), American artist and designer, wife and professional partner of Charles Eames
- Rebecca Eames (1640–1721), a woman accused of being a witch in the Salem witch trials
- Robin Eames (born 1937), Anglican Primate of All Ireland and Archbishop of Armagh
- Robert Eames (miller) (fl. 1816), American politician
- Rosemary Eames (1965–2002), Australian Paralympic swimmer
- Rossi Eames (born 1985), English former football head coach
- Terry Eames (born 1957), English football manager and former player
- Walter Eames (1884–1941), English footballer
- Wilberforce Eames (1855–1937), American bibliographer and librarian

== Fictional characters ==
- Alexandra Eames, lead character on Law and Order: Criminal Intent

== See also ==
- Emes
