= Emes =

Emes may refer to:

- EMES, an international research network.
- Emes, a surname.

People with the surname include:

- Ian Emes (born 1949), British artist and film director
- John Emes (1762–1810), British engraver and painter
- Rebecca Emes (died 1830), English silversmith
- Thomas Emes (died 1707), English quack doctor and millenarian
- William Emes (c. 1730–1803), English landscape gardener

== See also ==
- Eames
