= Don Albinson =

American designer

- Born: November 22, 1921; Sparta, Michigan
- Died: November 17, 2008 (aged 86); Minneapolis, Minnesota
- Occupation: Architect
- Design: Knoll 1601 Stack Chair; Westinghouse Office Seating Line; Albi stack chair Stylex Bounce stack chair

Don Charles Albinson (November 22, 1921 – November 17, 2008) was an American industrial designer who made many contributions to the world of furniture. He worked with Charles and Ray Eames for 13 years, helping develop many of the seminal Herman Miller furniture pieces from the mid century – the bent plywood chair, the fiberglass shell chair, the aluminum group set, and the Eames Lounge chair, to name a few. He later developed the Knoll Stack chair, the Westinghouse office line, an update to the DoMore Series 7 landscape system named Neo 7, the Albi stack chair for Fixtures, and the Bounce chair for Stylex.

== Biography ==
Albinson was born in Sparta, Michigan and raised in Detroit, Michigan. He attended Cranbrook Academy of Art in 1939, where he met Charles Eames, Ray Kaiser, Harry Bertoia, Eliel Saarinen, Eero Saarinen and Ralph Rapson. He also met his future wife, Nancy Blair Wilcox, at Cranbrook as well. He worked with Charles Eames and Eero Saarinen on the prototypes for the award-winning Eames – Saarinen designs for the 1941Organic Design in Home Furnishings competition at the Museum of Modern Art in New York City. He was drafted and served as a pilot in World War II. Upon returning from the war, he moved the family to Los Angeles to work in the Eames office where he worked from 1946 to 1959. He was the lead designer for the 13 years he worked in the office. During his years with Eames, Albinson was directly involved with the development and production of iconic Eames furniture designs such as the molded plywood screen, the dining chair with metal legs (DCM), the Aluminum Group Chair, and several other products on which he shared more than a dozen patents with Eames. He also helped with the construction the Eames Case Study House in Pacific Palisades in 1949, as well as the Max DePree House in Zeeland, Michigan along with numerous other furniture and film projects.

In 1964 Albinson moved the family to southeastern Pennsylvania; he had been offered the position of Design Director for Knoll, in East Greenville, Pennsylvania. He was tasked with getting a number of challenging projects into production, as well as given the opportunity to shepherd his own chair design into production, the iconic 1601 stacking chair. Knoll introduced the stacking chair in 1965 and it won the AID Award in 1967. He was design director from 1964 to 1971; during his tenure he put into production such seminal furniture pieces as the Pollack Executive chair, the Platner Steel Wire Lounge collection, the Don Petitt chair, and many others. He was the Design Director at Knoll until 1971. After that time, he became an independent consultant, designing projects for Westinghouse, Domore, Stylex and Fixtures.

In 1974 Westinghouse introduced the ASD Group of office seating, which Albinson designed, and it remained a very successful line for many years. In 1984 Albinson redesigned the DoMore Series 7 landscape furniture system, rebranding it the Neo 7 System. The Albi stack chair was introduced by Fixtures in 1987, and continued to be in production some 25 years later. The final contract furniture project was a stack chair for Stylex, the Bounce chair, introduced in 1997 and still in production through 2013. In 1977 the Allentown Art Museum (Pennsylvania) featured an exhibition of Albinson's furniture designs. In 2005 he donated his design archive to the Special Collections Department at Stanford University.

Albinson was said to have approached each project with an element of curiosity, research and engineering, ultimately weaving those elements into the aesthetics of the specific challenge. He mentored and influenced many young designers, and his legacy touched many lives, in a truly positive way. A scholarship was set up in 2013 at Cranbrook Academy of Art, in Bloomfield Hills, MI, rewarding a deserving 3D Design student in the MFA program with a scholarship each year to provide financial assistance.

== Furniture designs ==
- Knoll 1601 Stack Chair (1965)
- DoMore Neo 7 landscape system (1974)
- Albi stack chair (1987) Fixtures
- Stylex Bounce stack chair (1997)

== Exhibitions and retrospectives ==
- Furniture Designs by Don Albinson at the Allentown Art Museum, Pennsylvania (1977)
