= James Jefferys =

English painter

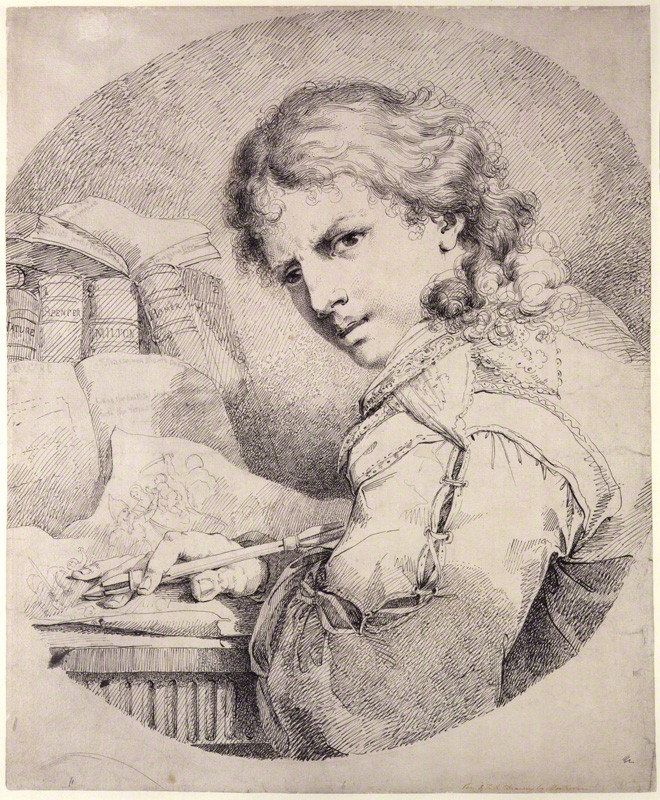
- self-portrait
- Born: 19 May 1751; Maidstone, England
- Died: 31 January 1784 (aged 32); Soho, London, England

James Jefferys (19 May 1751 – 31 January 1784) was a British engraver and painter. His work was reassessed in the 1970s following the discovery of a lost set of drawings in Maidstone. He is known for his drawings of violent classical subjects and his painting The Scene before Gibraltar on the morning of 14 Sept. 1782.

== Life ==
Jefferys was born in Maidstone in 1751 to William and Parnell Jefferys; his father was a coach painter and artist. He spent time working under William Woollett who was also born in Maidstone. Jefferys enrolled at the Royal Academy and his talent was marked with a gold medal for a drawing titled Seleucus and Stratonice in 1773. That year he started exhibiting at the Society of Artists and the following year he gained a prize from the Society. The Dilettante Society underwrote the expense of three years in Rome after a recommendation by Sir Joshua Reynolds. Jefferys stretched this to four years and returned with a number of well regarded classical drawings of violent subjects, but no paintings are known. Jefferys was known to have had a wild time and some reported his behaviour as odd. Jefferys' drawings were in the style of James Barry and John Hamilton Mortimer (Jefferys may have worked with Mortimer whilst he was at the Royal Academy).

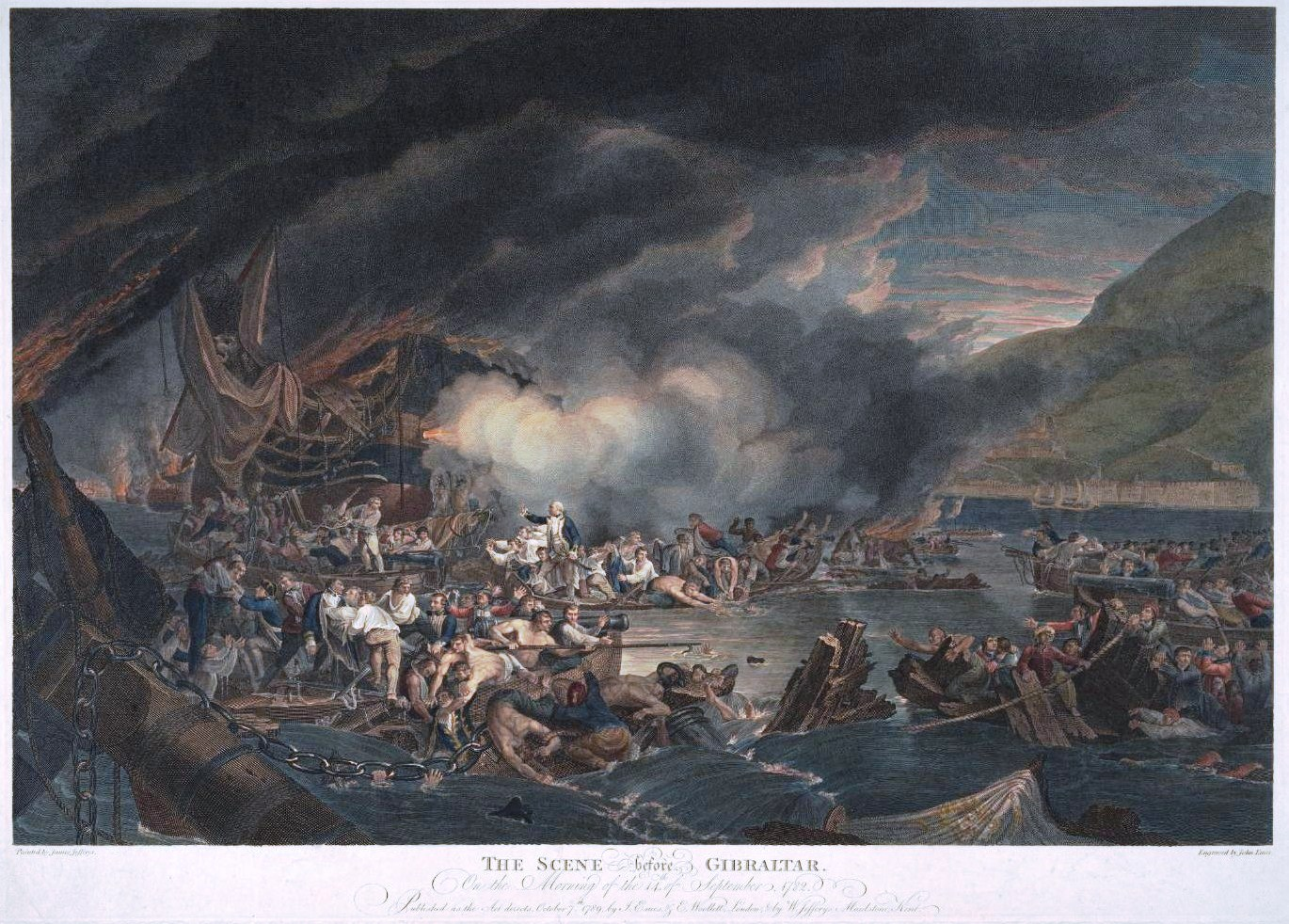
The Scene Before Gibraltar by James Jefferys 1783

When he returned to England he established his own studio at Meard's Court in Soho. His most important work was The Scene before Gibraltar on the morning of 14 Sept. 1782 which he exhibited at the Royal Academy in 1783. The subject of the painting took place during the Great Siege of Gibraltar when the Spanish built purpose built ships that were floating batteries designed to be unsinkable. Jefferys' past master, William Woolett, undertook an engraving of the painting but John Emes had to complete the task after Woolett died.

Jefferys died in Soho, London, unmarried, from a cold at the end of January 1784.

== Legacy ==
Jefferys' Gibraltar painting was exhibited at the European Museum in 1804. Many drawings by Jefferys were erroneously attributed to James Barry and John Hamilton Mortimer until they were reassigned in the 1970s. This came about following the discovery of a collection of his drawings in Maidstone. Jefferys has work in the National Portrait Gallery and the Victoria and Albert Museum, and his painting of the battle at Gibraltar is at Maidstone Museum & Art Gallery. His work is regarded as important but derivative.
