= Henry Thomas Alken =

English painter

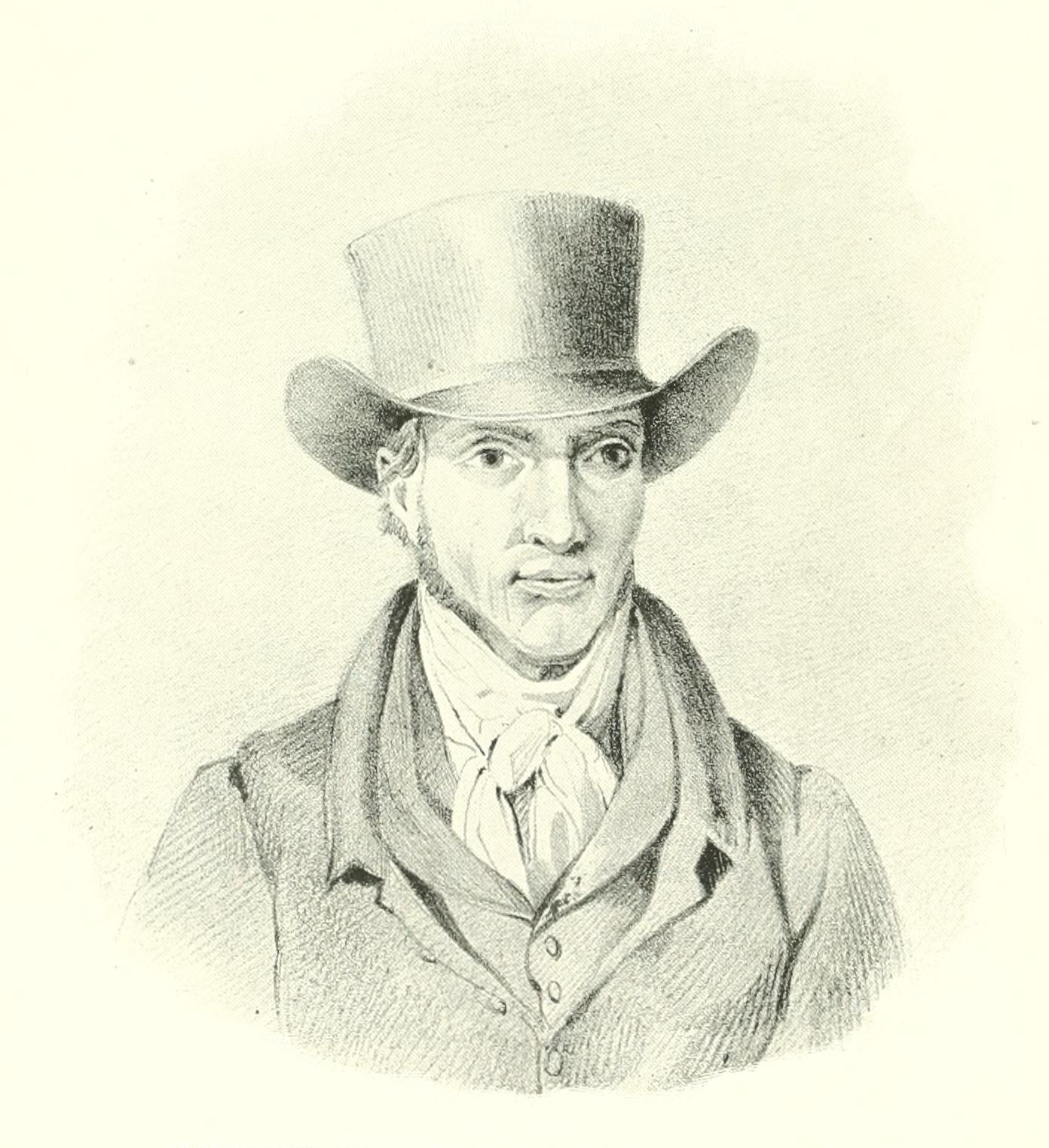
Portrait of Henry Thomas Alken as Ben Talley O (published in Animal painters of England from the year 1650 by Walter Gilbey).

Henry Thomas Alken (12 October 1785 – 7 April 1851) was an English painter and engraver chiefly known as a caricaturist and illustrator of sporting subjects and coaching scenes. His most prolific period of painting and drawing occurred between 1816 and 1831.

== Life ==
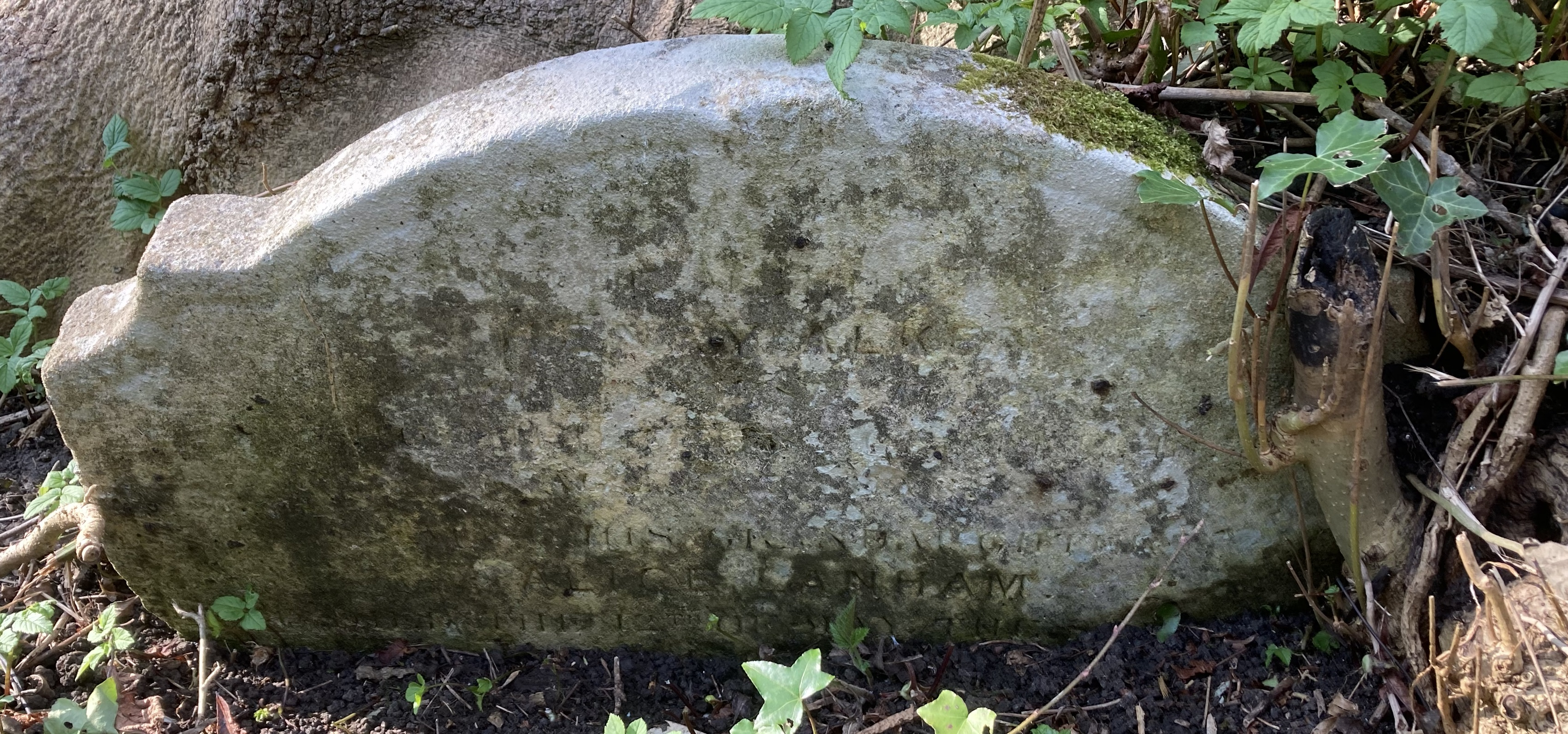
Grave of Henry Alken in Highgate Cemetery

Alken was born on 12 October 1785 in Soho, Westminster, and baptised on 6 November at St James's Church, Piccadilly. He was the third son of Samuel Alken, a sporting artist. Two of his brothers were George and Samuel Alken the Younger, also an artist. In 1789, the Alken family moved from Soho to 2, Francis Street East, Bedford Square.

Young Henry first studied under his father and then with the miniature painter John Thomas Barber Beaumont (1774–1841), also known as J. T. Barber. In 1801, Alken sent a miniature portrait of Miss Gubbins to the Royal Academy Exhibition. He exhibited a second miniature at the Royal Academy before abandoning miniature painting and taking on painting and illustrating. Early in his career, he painted sporting subjects under the name of "Ben Tally-O". Alken married Maria Gordon on 14 October 1809 at St Clement's Church, Ipswich. On 22 August of the following year later the couple's first son was baptised. Alken went on to father five children, of whom two were artists, Samuel Henry, also a sporting artist, known as Henry Alken junior, and Sefferien junior.

From about 1816 onwards Alken "produced an unending stream of paintings, drawings and engravings of every type of field and other sporting activity," and his soft-ground etchings were often colored by hand. When Alken was 26, he and his young family lived over a shop in Haymarket that belonged to print publisher Thomas McLean of the "Repository of Wit and Humour." McLean paid Alken a daily wage of thirty shillings, considered a good income at the time.

Alken died in April 1851 and was buried on the western side of Highgate cemetery. Although fairly affluent for most of his career, he fell on hard times towards the end of his life and was buried at his daughter's expense.

== Work ==
Alken worked in both oil and watercolor and was a skilled etcher. His earliest productions were published anonymously under the signature of "Ben Tallyho", but in 1816 he issued The Beauties & Defects in the Figure of the Horse comparatively delineated under his own name. From this date until about 1831, he produced many sets of etchings of sporting subjects mostly coloured and sometimes humorous in character, the principal of which were: Humorous Specimens of Riding 1821, Symptoms of being amazed 1822, Symptoms of being amused 1822, Flowers from Nature 1823, A Touch at the Fine Arts 1824, and Ideas 1830. Besides these he published a series of books: Illustrations for Landscape Scenery and Scraps from the Sketch Book of Henry Alken in 1823, New Sketch Book in 1824, Sporting Scrap Book and Shakespeare's Seven Ages in 1827, Sporting Sketches and in 1831 Illustrations to Popular Songs and Illustrations of Don Quixote, the latter engraved by John Christian Zeitter.

Alken provided the plates picturing hunting, coaching, racing and steeplechasing for The National Sports of Great Britain (London, 1821). Alken, known as an avid sportsman, is best remembered for his hunting prints, many of which he engraved himself until the late 1830s. (Charles Lane British Racing Prints pp. 75–76). He created prints for the leading sporting printsellers such as S. and J. Fuller, Thomas McLean, and Rudolph Ackermann, and often collaborated with his friend the sporting journalist Charles James Apperley (1779–1843), also known as Nimrod. Nimrod's Life of a Sportsman, with 32 etchings by Alken, was published by Ackermann in 1842. In many of his etchings, Alken explored the comic side of riding and satirized the foibles of aristocrats, much in the tradition of other early 19th century omthe oldest of the great foxhound packs in Leicestershire. A collection of his illustrations can be seen in the print department of the British Museum.

== Gallery ==
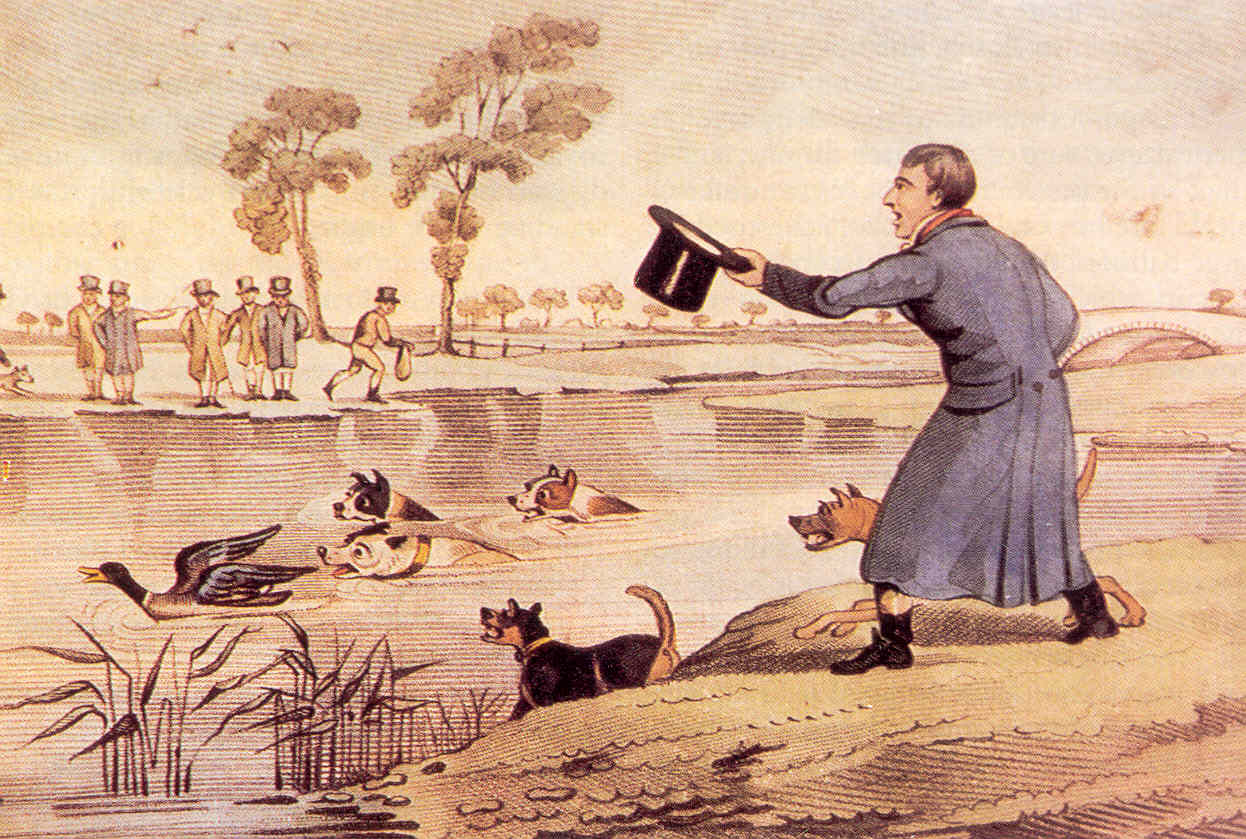
Circa 1820: Duck-baiting by Henry Alken

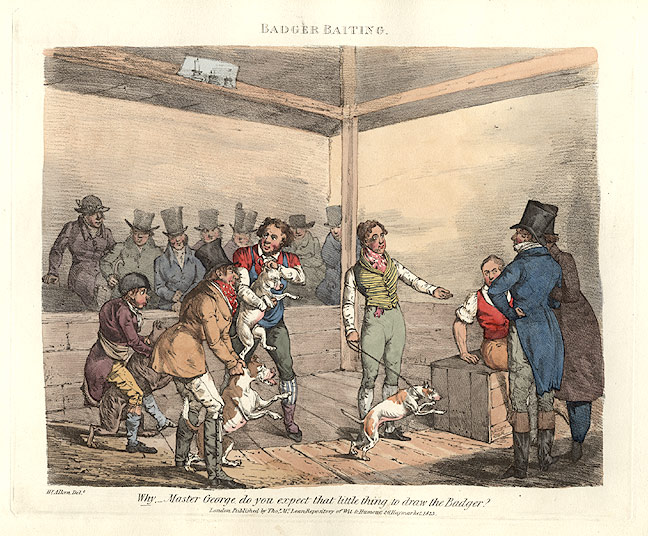
Circa 1823: A scene from Badger Baiting a series also so called "Master George" by Henry Alken

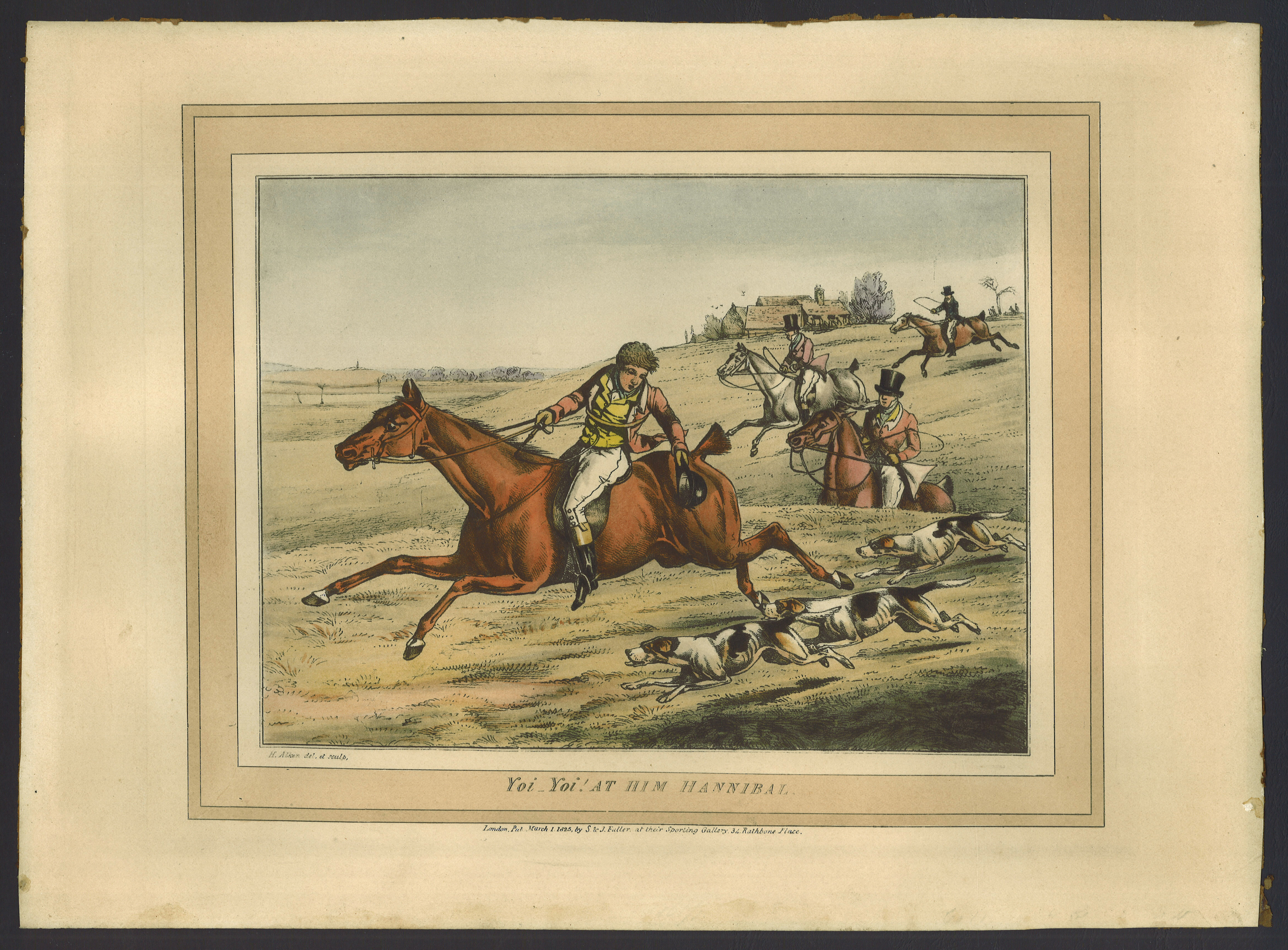
March 1, 1825: One of several engravings by Alken at the same time "published ...by S. & J. Fuller, at their Sporting Gallery, 34, Rathbone Place."

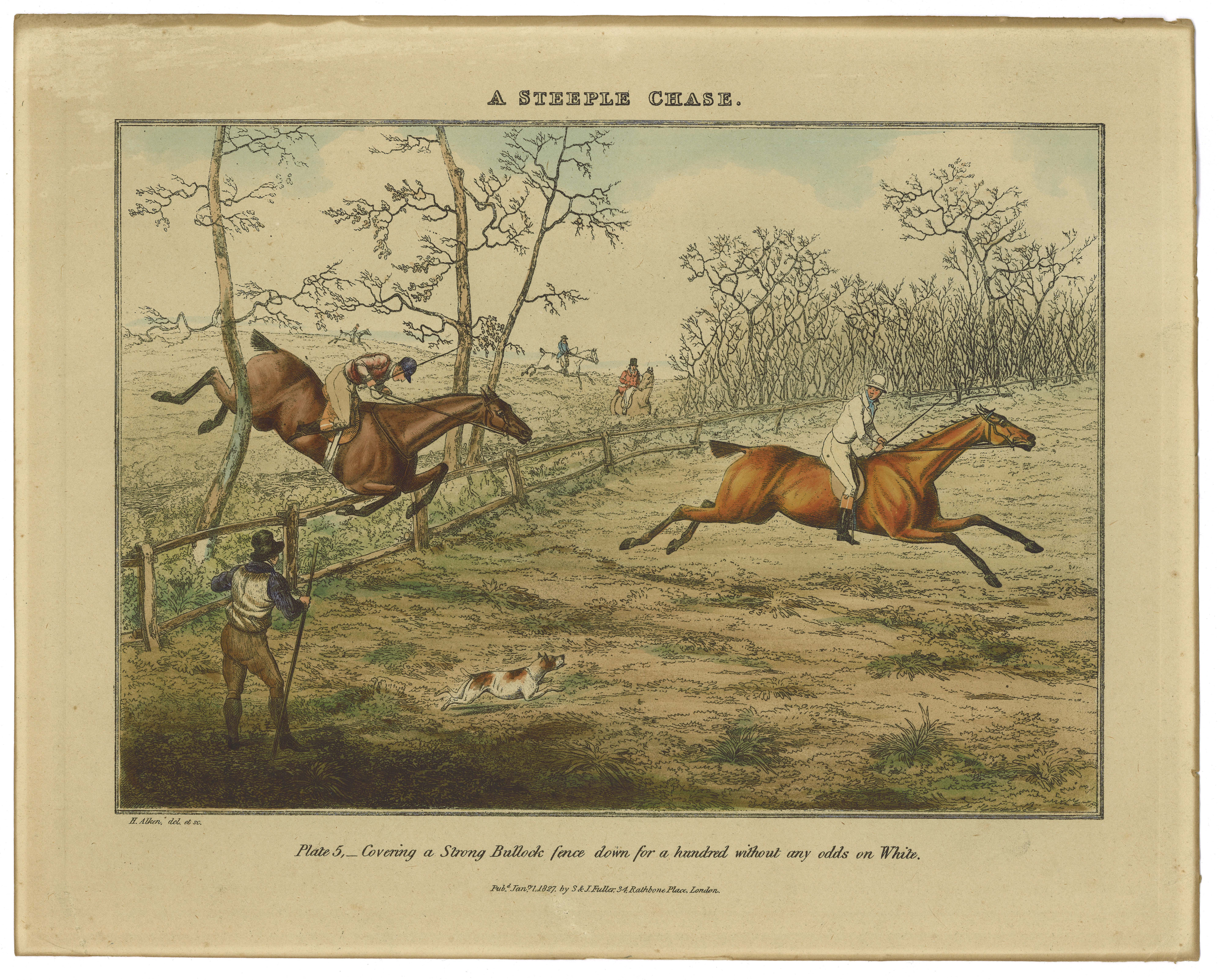
January 1, 1827: A Steeple Chase. "Plate 5..." of 6 by Henry Alken

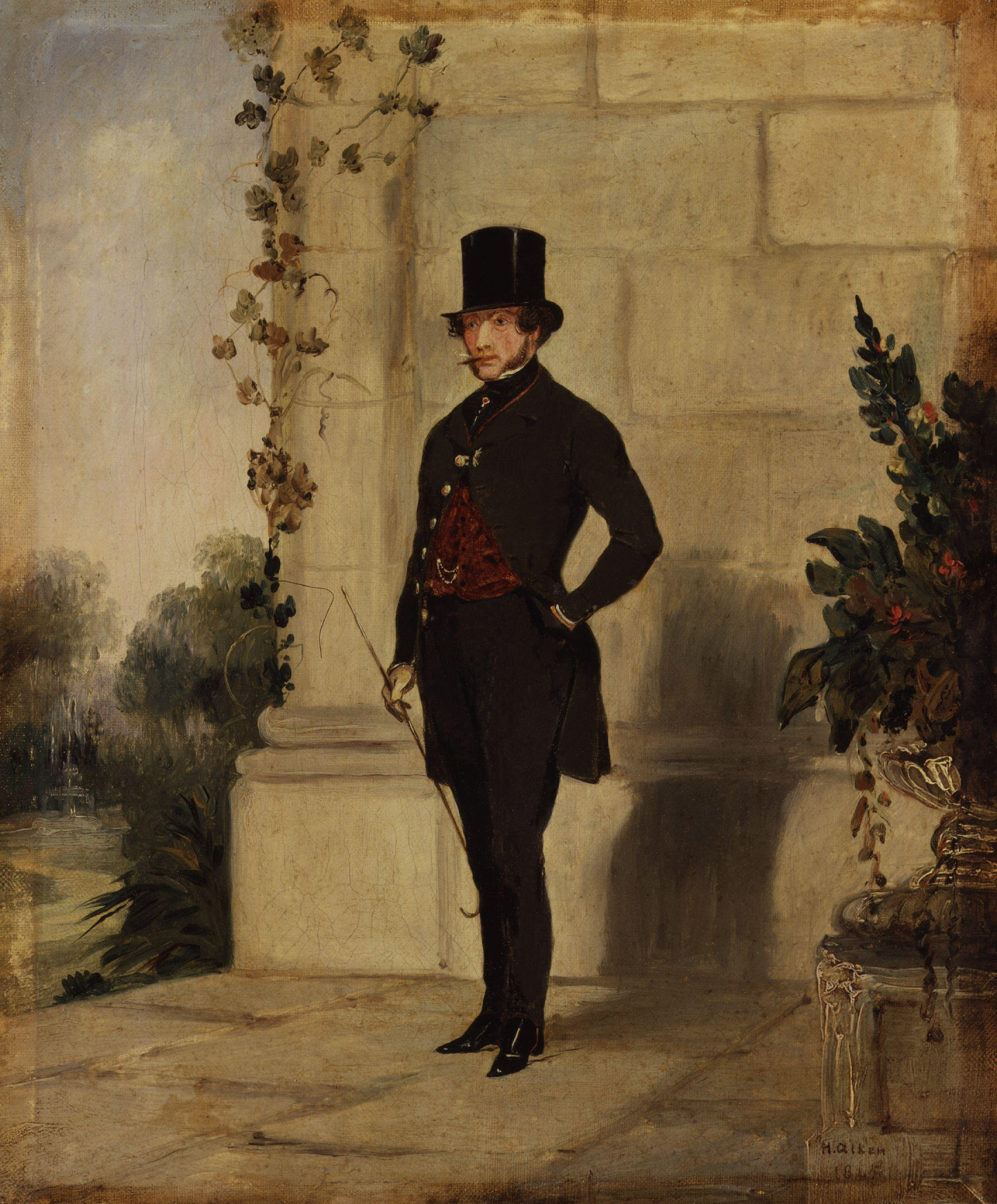
1845: Portrait of Henry Somerset, 7th Duke of Beaufort by Henry Alken

== See also ==
- Samuel Alken

== Books illustrated by Henry Alken ==
- The National Sports of Great Britain: fifty engravings with descriptions By Henry Thomas Alken, 1903
- The Life of a Sportsman by Nimrod
- Real Life in London; or The rambles and adventures of Bob Tallyho ..., Volume 2 By Pierce Egan
- The Art and Practice of Etching by Henry Alken, 1849
