= Samuel Alken =

English artist (1756–1815)

- Born: 22 October 1756; London, UK
- Died: 9 November 1815 (aged 59); London, UK
- Education: Royal Academy Schools
- Known for: aquatint

Samuel Alken Sr. (22 October 1756 in London – 9 November 1815 in London) was an English artist, a leading exponent of the newly developed technique of aquatint.

== History ==
Samuel Alken entered the Royal Academy Schools, London, as a sculptor in 1772. He published A New Book of Ornaments Designed and Etched by Samuel Alken in 1779, and later established himself as one of the most competent engravers in the new technique of aquatint.

His works included plates after George Morland, Richard Wilson, Thomas Rowlandson and Francis Wheatley. His plates for Sixteen views of the lakes in Cumberland and Westmorland after drawings John Emes and John Smith were published in 1796, and a set of aquatint views of North Wales after drawings by the Rev. Brian Broughton in 1798.

== Relatives ==
The Alken family claims several well-known artists.

== See also ==
- Henry Thomas Alken

== Bibliography ==
- S. T. Prideaux: Aquatint Engraving (London, 1909, rev. 1968)
- M. D. George: A Catalogue of Political and Personal Satires, London, B.M. cat., vii (London, 1942)
