= Maidstone Museum =

Museum in Maidstone, Kent, England

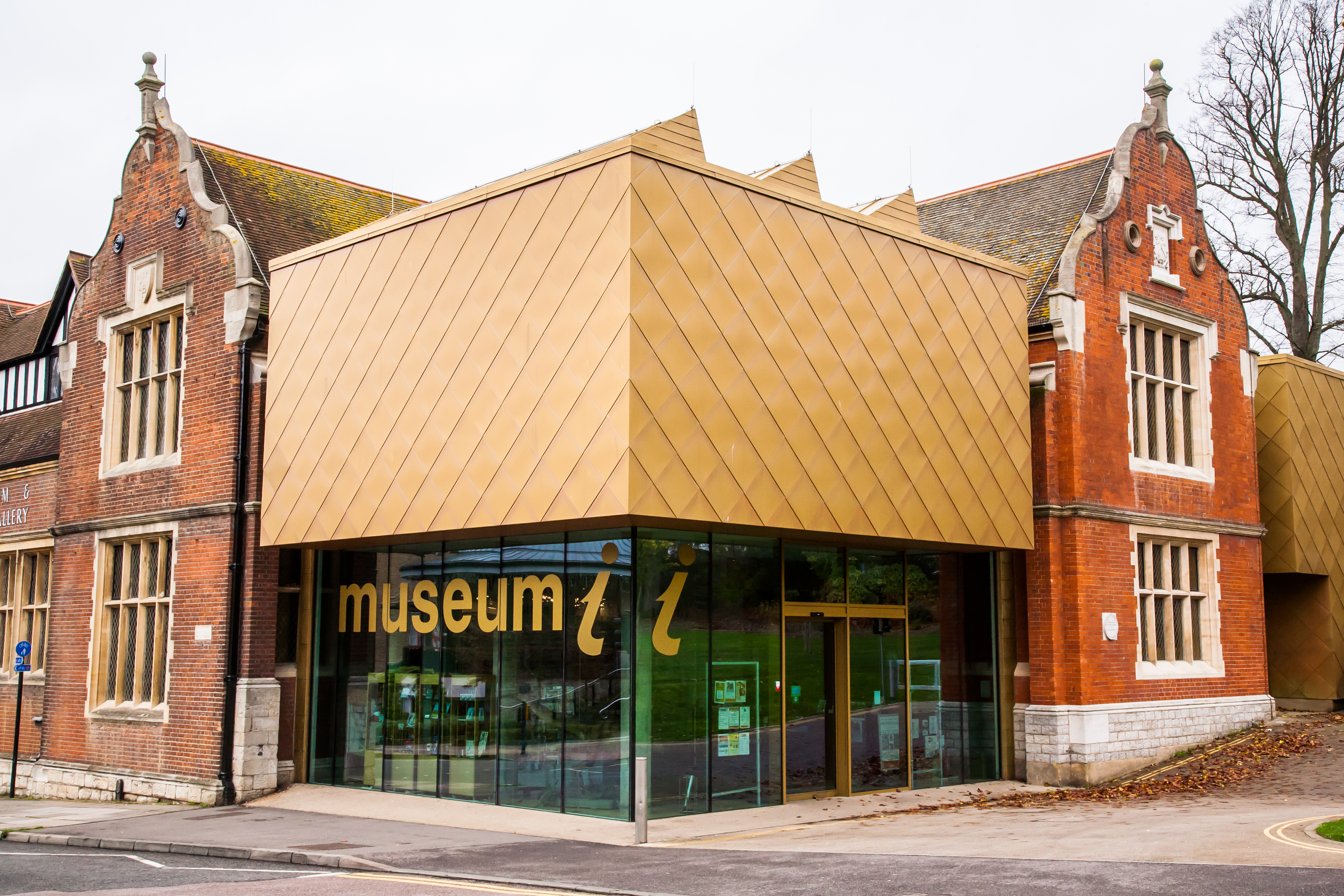
- Established: 1858
- Location: St Faiths Street, Maidstone, Kent, England ME14 1LH
- Coordinates: 51°16′33″N 0°31′14″E
- Type: Regional museum, regimental museum, art gallery, heritage centre, historic house museum
- Public transit access: Maidstone East railway station; Arriva Southern Counties
- Website: Museum.maidstone.gov.uk

Maidstone Museum is a local authority-run museum located in Maidstone, Kent, England, featuring internationally important collections including fine art, natural history, and human history. The museum is one of three operated by Maidstone Borough Council. The building is Grade II* listed.

== Overview ==
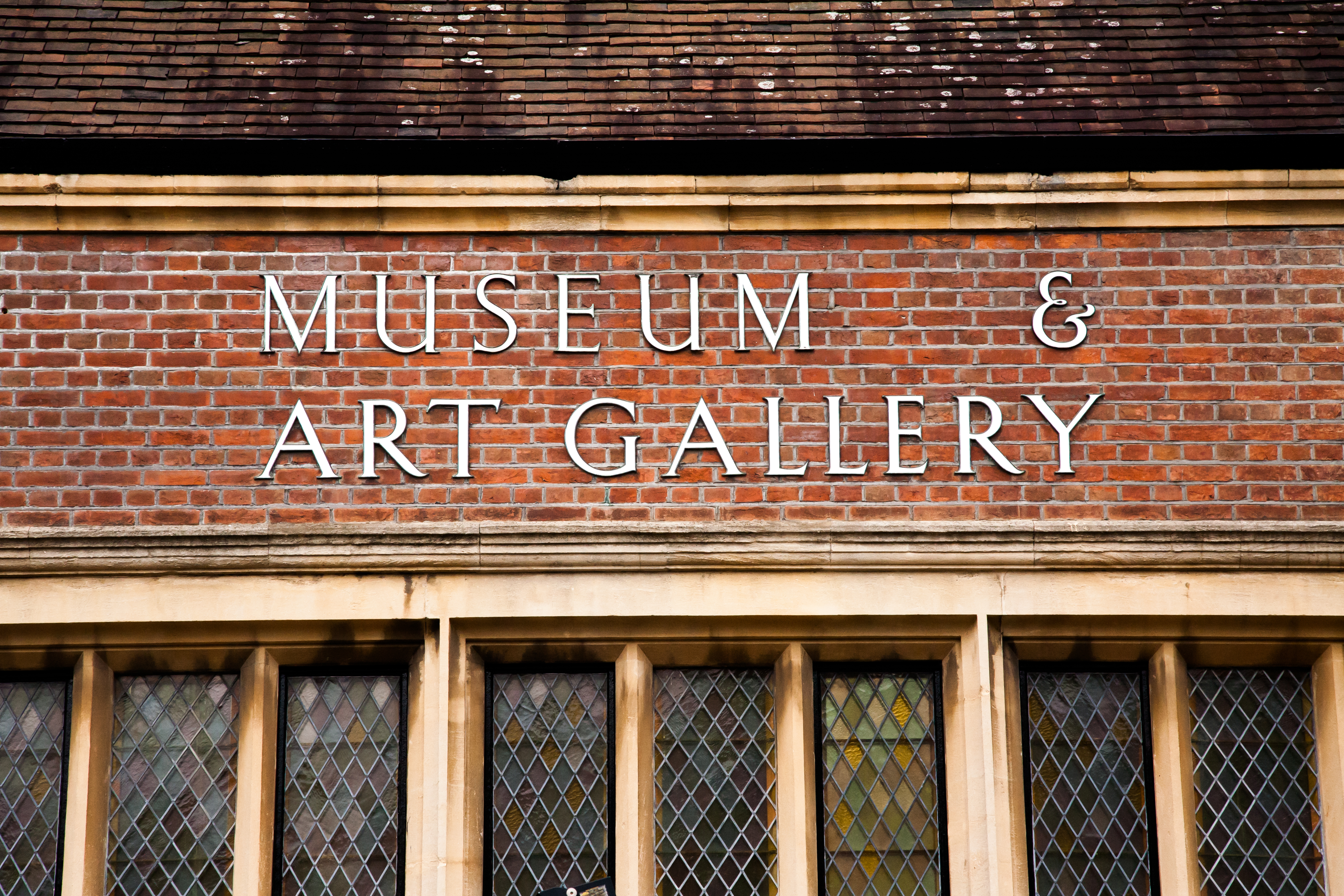
Maidstone Museum and Art Gallery

In 1855 Thomas Charles, a local doctor and antiquarian, left his collections of art and antiquities to Maidstone Borough Council, requesting that his executors, "make such arrangements as they should think fit for the permanent preservation thereof in the town of Maidstone, and the same to be called the Charles Museum." The Council subsequently acquired Charles' house, Chillington Manor, from his executors and, in 1858, opened it as the Charles Museum, later renamed Maidstone Museum. The museum was one of the first to be opened as a result of the Museums Act 1845 and was a founder member of the Museums Association (1909).

== Building ==
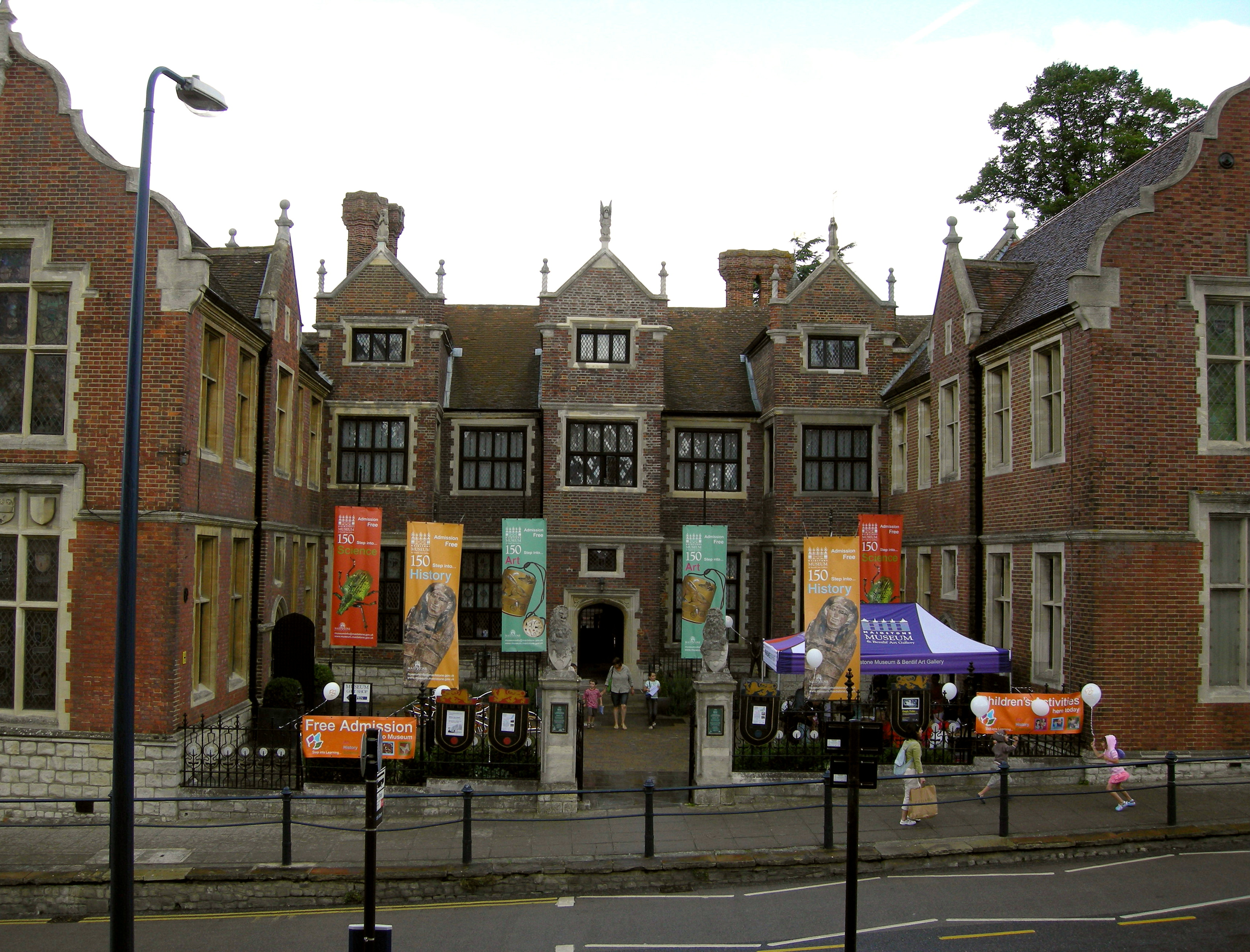
Original entrance in 2009 (since replaced by a newly built entrance lobby)

The Museum's central core consists of an Elizabethan manor house, formerly known as Chillington Manor, completed in 1577 with earlier Tudor buildings to its rear. In the early 18th century a substantial wing was added to the west of the Tudor house. Upon the death of Thomas Charles and in accordance with his estate, Maidstone Borough Council purchased the building in 1856 for the sum of £1,200, investing a further £300 for repairs. On 20 January 1858, the Museum opened as one of the UK's first local authority-run museums, appointing Edward Petty - a friend of the late Thomas Charles - as the museum's first curator in September. After its opening as a museum, the building was further extended to house the growing collections. A new east wing was added in 1869, matched by new wing to the west in 1873 made possible by donations from Julius Brenchley.

The eastern elevation was extended in 1889 to accommodate the Bentlif Art Gallery funded by Samuel Bentlif to house the art collection amassed by his brother, George. On the western side, the Victoria Gallery, housing the town's library, was built between 1897 and 1899 to commemorate Queen Victoria's Diamond Jubilee. The Bentlif Wing was extended in 1923.

== Collections ==
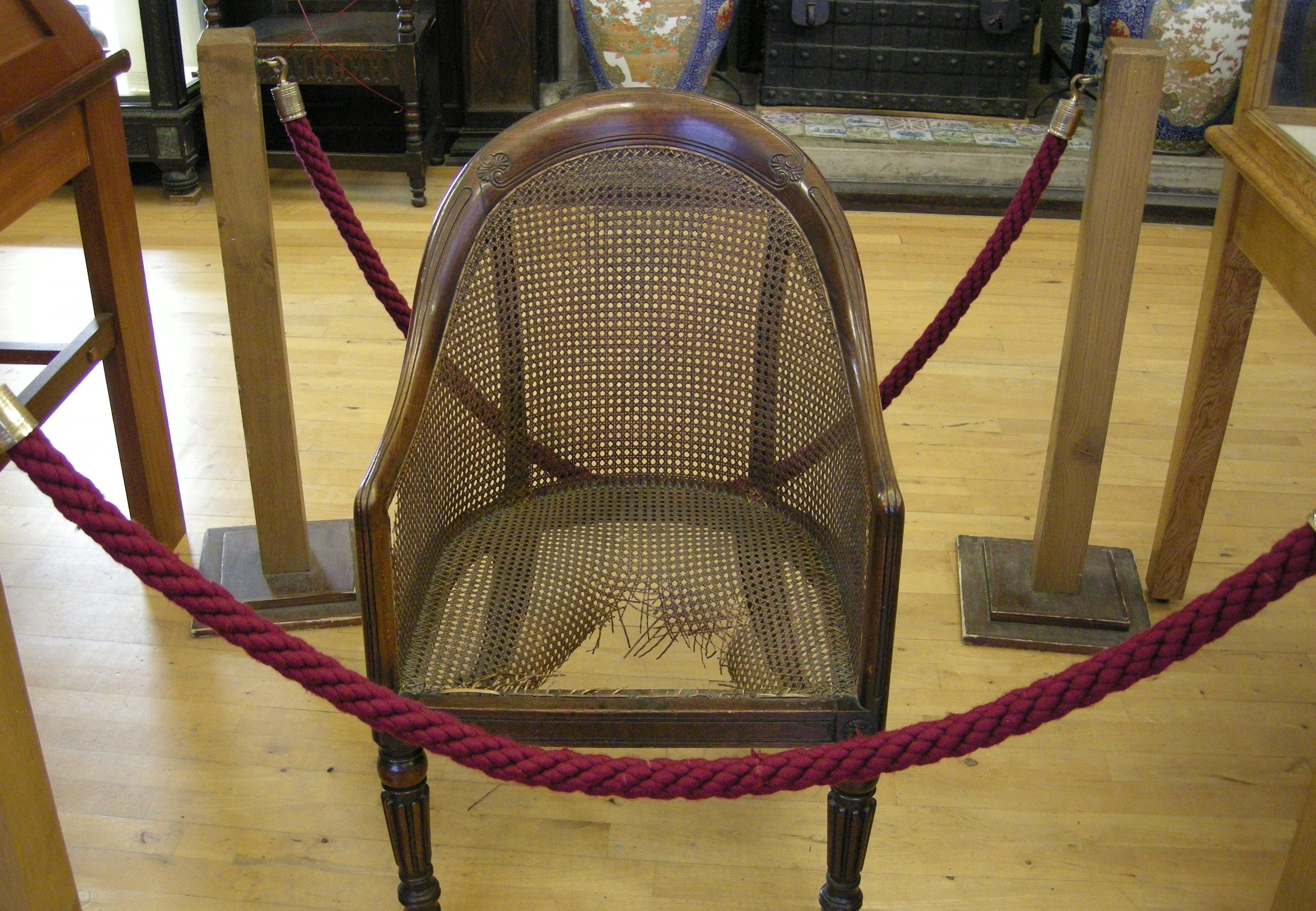
Napoleon's chair

The Museum is recognised as having the largest mixed collections in the county and one of the most important in the south-east of England, outside London. Whilst its origins are typical of a regional museum created through Victorian munificence, the work of collectors, staff and benefactors over almost 150 years has created a comprehensive collection of worldwide significance. Numismatist Elizabeth Pirie worked on the collections from 1957 to 1960. The collections consist of over 600,000 artefacts and specimens. Three collections are of national importance:

- Anglo-Saxon – the best collection of artefacts from the richest Anglo-Saxon region of Britain.
- Japanese – one of the largest and most important collections outside London.
- The Brenchley Collection – a large and diverse collection of worldwide ethnography, natural history and fine and decorative art collected by a mid-Victorian explorer: Julius Brenchley.

=== Human history ===
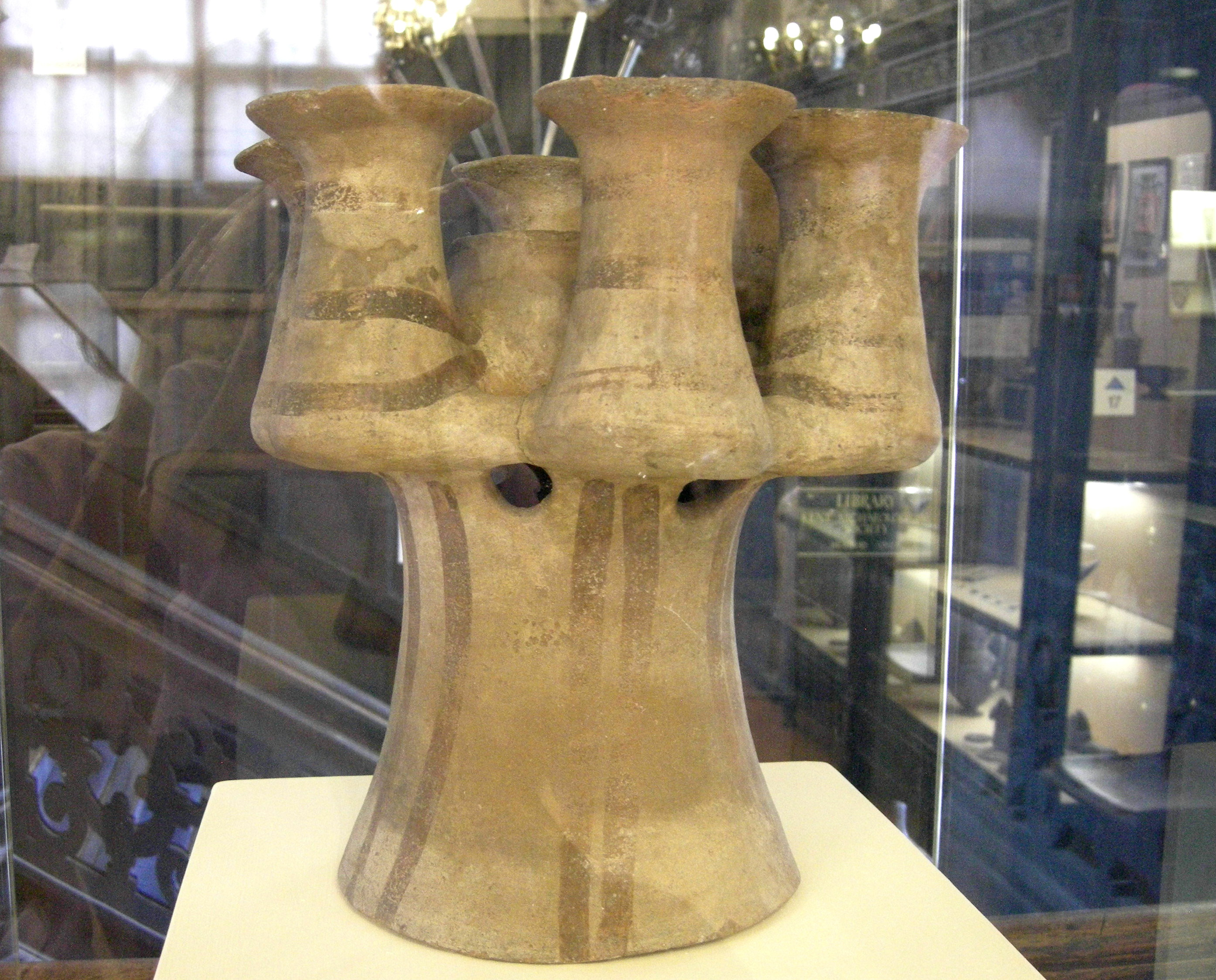
Kernos from Melos in Greece

The Human History collections contain approximately 125,000 artefacts. The British archaeology collection covers Kent and beyond; the internationally recognized Anglo-Saxon collection comprises approximately 4,000 Kentish artefacts. Foreign archaeology includes pieces such as the Gandhara heads and over 400 Egyptian artefacts. The Egyptian collection is home to the mummified remains of Ta-Kush a woman who was born in what is now Sudan before being buried in Egypt in the second half of the 7th century BC. A new acquisition in 2009 was the kernos from Melos in Greece; it is early Cycladic III period and 4000 years old. There are only eight of these in the world, and this one was possibly used to hold various offerings, such as honey and oats.

The local history collections are varied and relate to all areas of local life. There are collections of arms and armour, clocks and watches and a collection of over 18,000 coins and medals. The collection of photographs and maps is of local importance and is complemented by over 10,000 items of printed ephemera relating to the history of Kent. The museum also owns the second volume of the Lambeth Bible, a giant Romanesque illuminated bible from the 12th century (the first volume is in the Lambeth Palace library).

There are internationally important collections of artefacts of Pacific, Oceanic and African ethnography as well as diverse material from Asia and North and South America. Napoleon's chair has been held in the museum since 1866. It was one of a pair in the house of Reverend Richard Boys on St Helena, and after Napoleon was exiled there in 1815 he habitually sat in this chair, conversed with Boys and damaged the chair with his penknife while talking.

=== The arts ===
The Fine and Applied Art collections comprise approximately 25,000 items. They include 17th to 19th century furniture, musical instruments, toys and games, ceramics, glass, costumes and needlework, paintings, prints and drawings and sculpture. One exhibit beloved of the local people is the Lady Godiva statue by John Thomas (1813–1862).

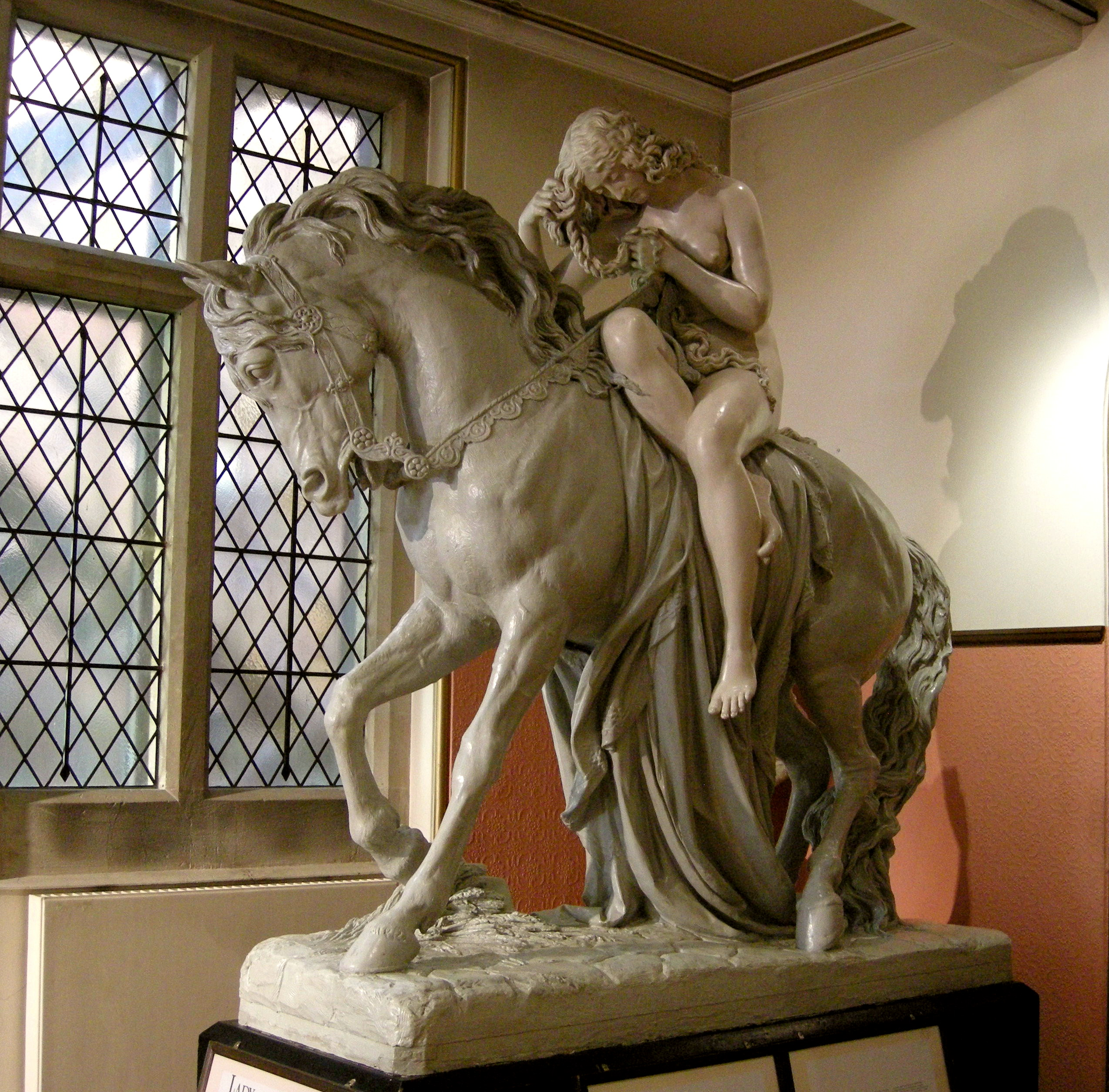
Lady Godiva by John Thomas

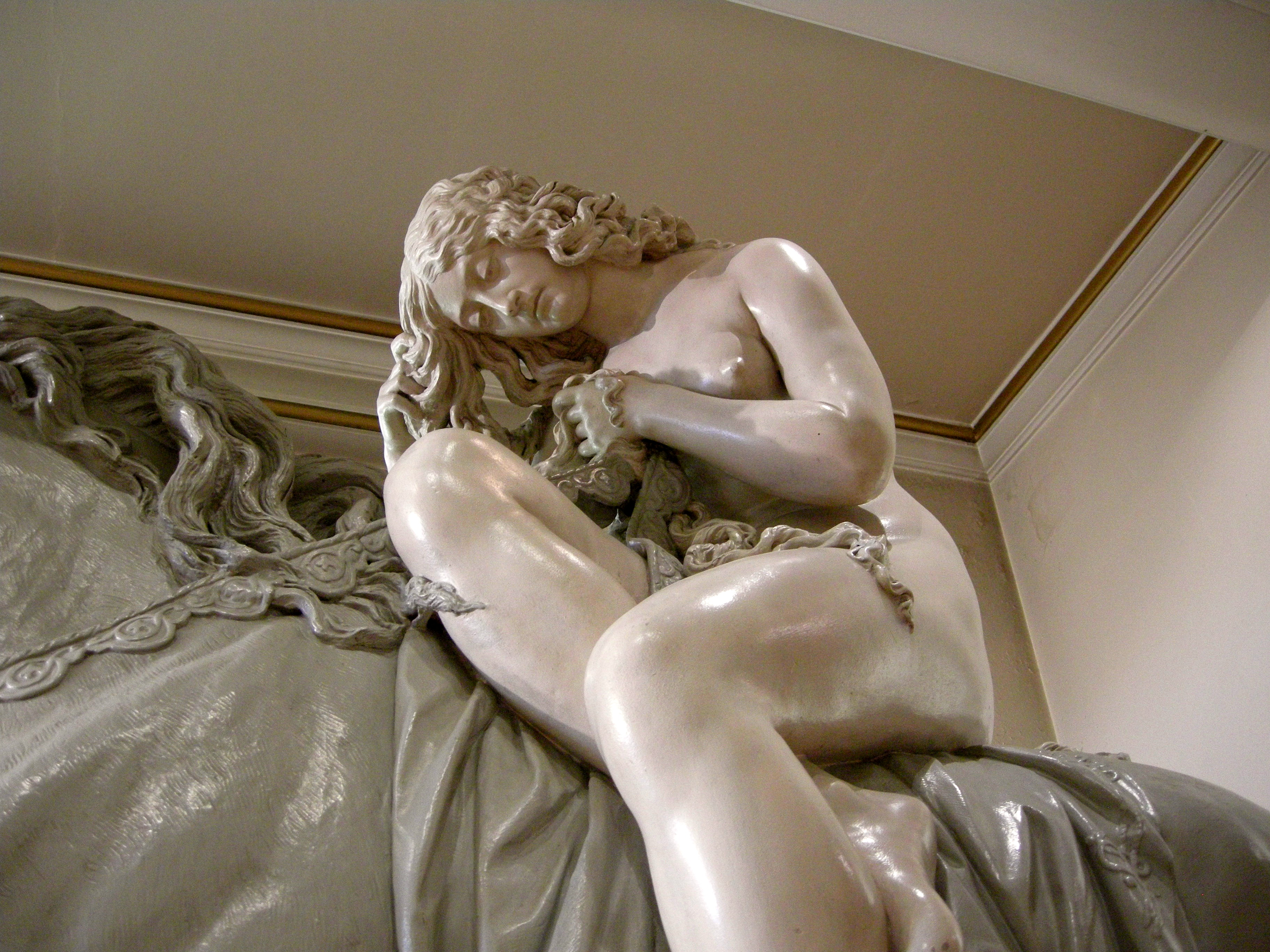
Lady Godiva by John Thomas

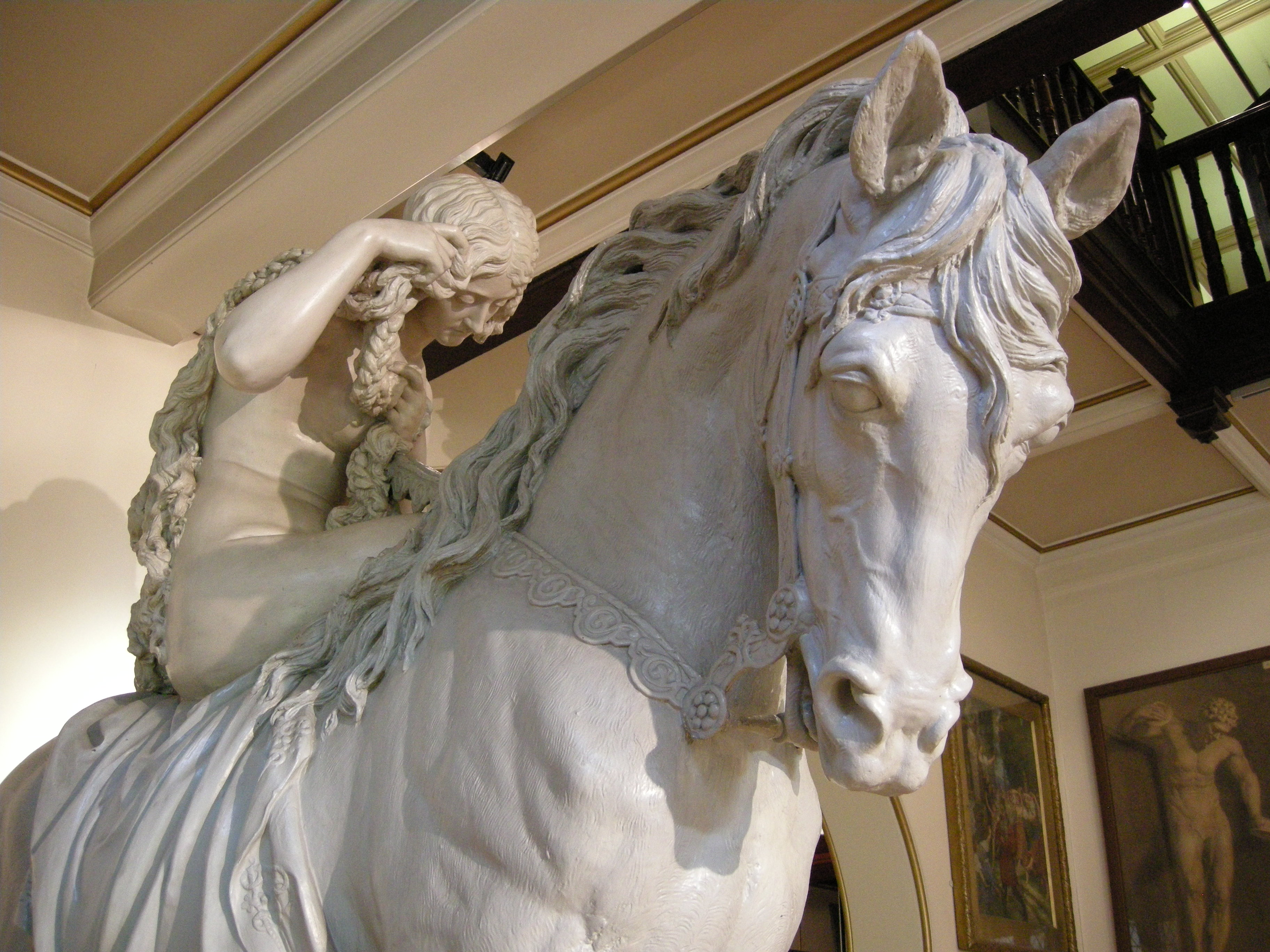
Lady Godiva by John Thomas

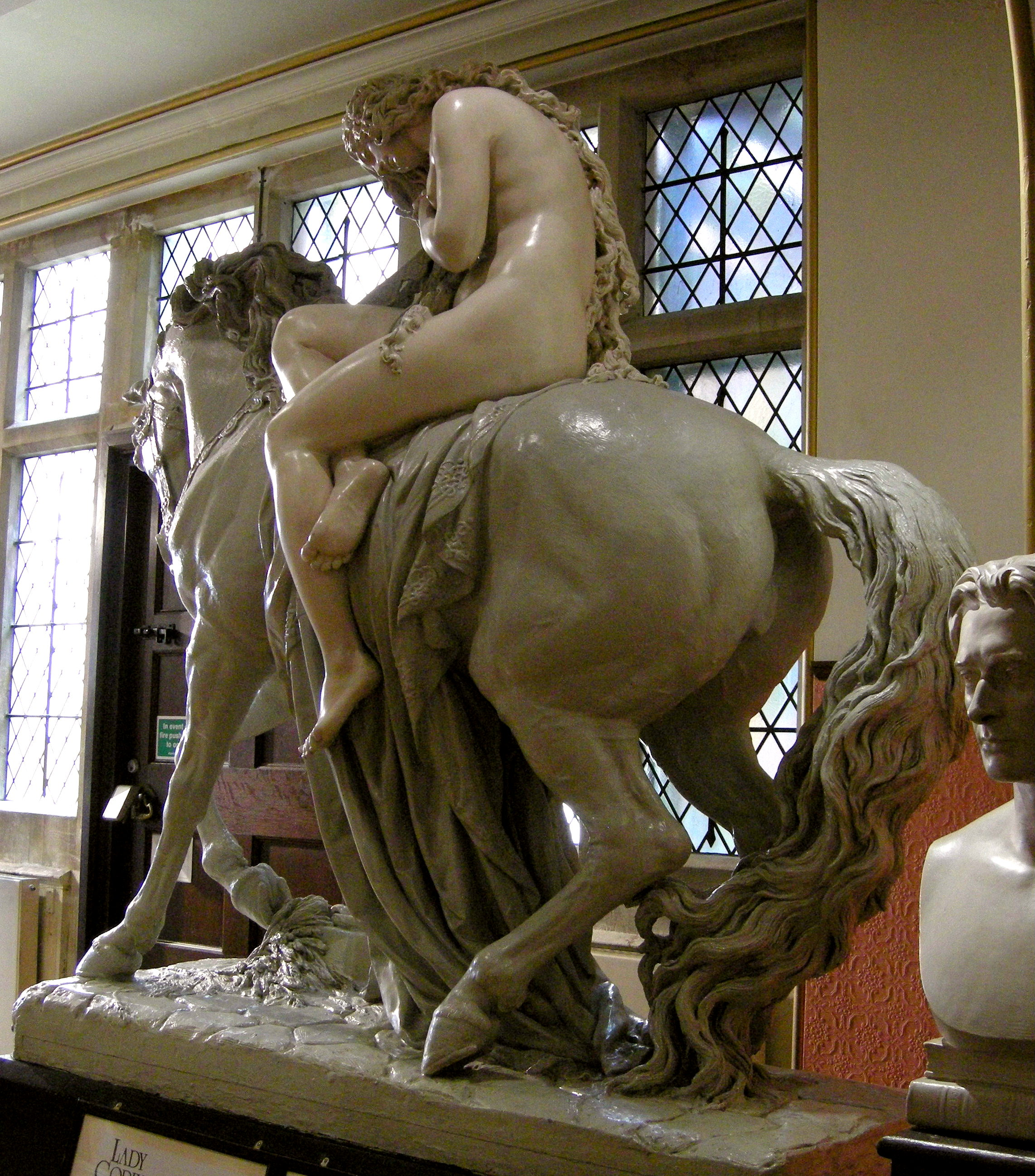
Lady Godiva by John Thomas

The ceramics holdings form the most significant collection in the region with around 700 English pieces as well as around 250 European pieces. The collection of Chinese ceramics, mostly of 17th to 19th century date, is comprehensive. Approximately 8,000 specimens of costume date from the 17th to 21st century. Complementing needlework collections comprise around 700 specimens, including English embroidery and samplers, European embroideries and Eastern textiles.

The Japanese collections of fine and decorative art material are important and amongst the most studied in the country. They include ceramics, sword fittings, netsuke, lacquer and books as well a series of over 750 Edo-period (1600–1868) woodblock prints.

580 oil paintings include minor continental Old Masters and 19th to 20th century British works. Watercolours include over 200 works by Albert Goodwin, the largest public collection of his work and local artist James Jefferys.

=== Natural history ===
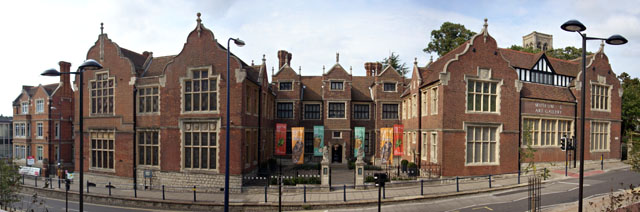
Southern elevation of the 16th and 19th century museum building, in St Faiths Street.

A collection of around 450,000 specimens in the natural history section includes specimens of national and international significance.

The bird collections include 1,800 mounted British specimens, 400 foreign birds and over 1,100 cabinet skins. There are also 300 birds' nests and a collection of bird's eggs covering most species on the British list. The Herbarium contains approximately 30,000 specimens representative of the flora of the British Isles. There is also a British collection of some 6,000 specimens of critical genera including Rubus, Taraxacum and Hieracium. The Herbarium collection is the basis of Philp's Atlas of the Kent Flora. There is an entomology collection of around 250,000 specimens forming a comprehensive collection of British insects; and an important collection of several thousand shells, mainly of tropical marine origin, but including temperate marine and freshwater, and tropical terrestrial species.

The collections of palaeontology and vascular plants are of national importance, with type, cited and figured specimens; the plants including voucher specimens for Kent and the nationally important Hawkweed (West) Collection. The main strengths of the palaeontology are the marine Cretaceous and Tertiary of Kent, especially Chalk, Lower Greensand and Lenham Beds; but also Gault and London Clay. There is an extensive collection of Pleistocene vertebrate material and fossils from the Kent Coalfield. Rocks (46,000) and minerals (7,000) are represented on a worldwide scale. The museum contains one of the most comprehensive mineral collections in the country outside the national museums.

== Regimental Museum ==
The Queen's Own Royal West Kent Regiment Museum, an independent charitable trust, has been housed in the Museum since 1964 and forms one of Maidstone Museum's fifteen public galleries. Its collection of regimental memorabilia features over 3,000 medals, including four Victoria Crosses.
