= E. J. Eames =

American poet

- Born: Elizabeth Jessup; June 26, 1813; Schodack, New York, U.S.
- Died: November 1856 (aged 43); Channahon, Illinois, U.S.
- Occupation: writer
- Spouse: Walter S. Eames (m. 1805; died 1851)
- Children: 4
- Writing career
- Pen name: Stella; Mrs. E. J. Eames
- Period: Romantic era
- Genres: poetry; prose

E. J. Eames (née, Elizabeth Jessup; pen name Stella and Mrs. E. J. Eames; June 26, 1813 – November 1856) was an American writer of prose and poetry of the Romantic era She was a regular contributor to Horace Greeley's New Yorker for some years before her marriage (under the signature of "Stella"); and thereafter, her writings frequently appeared in Graham's Magazine, the Southern Literary Messenger, and later still, in The Columbian.

== Early life ==
Elizabeth Jessup was born in Schodack, New York on June 26, 1813. Her father, Isaac Jessup (d. 1853, was a Deacon and served as County Treasurer of Will County, Illinois. Her siblings included brothers, and a sister, Sarah (d. 1863). Until age 17, Eames lived in a secluded village on the banks of the Hudson River. She suffered from poor health.

== Career ==
She began publishing in 1831, over the signature of "Stella". In 1834, she removed with her parents to Channahon, Will County, Illinois. For several years, she was a contributor to the New Yorker, and later, frequently wrote for the New-York Tribune. Greeley once made her an offer for the manuscript volume, which was declined. Elizabeth was Greeley's first love, but her father strongly opposed the match, insisting that his daughter should marry Walter S. Eames, a rich man, in preference to a poor printer.

In February 1837, she married Walter S. Eames (1805-1851), an Illinois farmer. They removed to New Hartford, New York near Utica, where he was engaged in mercantile business. Their children were, William L. (1838–1868), Albertine (1840–1872), Fannie S. (b. 1842), and Charles E. (b. 1844). After her marriage, she signed her writings, "Mrs. E. J. Eames". Greeley retained a warm regard for Eames even after her marriage.

Eames was the friend and contemporary of Margaret Fuller at the time when Fuller had charge of the literary department of the New-York Tribune. Eames' poetry especially attracted the attention of Edgar Allan Poe, who also was struck with her beauty and charm. Eames' more carefully finished poems appeared in Graham's Magazine and the Southern Literary Messenger. Many of her poems were published in a volume issued just before her death.

== Later life ==
Mr. Eames drowned in the Hudson River in September 1851. Mrs. Eames died of consumption (Note: The New Orleans Crescent reported that Eames died at the residence of her brother in Charbon, Ohio.) in Channahon, Illinois, November 1856. Her papers passed into the possession of her children.

== Critical reception ==
Rufus Wilmot Griswold, in his Female Poets of America, said of Eames:— "She writes with feeling, but she regards poetry as an art, and to the cultivation of it she brings her best powers. While thoughtful and earnest, therefore, her pieces are for the most part distinguished for a tasteful elegance." He selected for publication "The Crowning of Petrarch", "The Death of Pan", "Cleopatra", the "Sonnets" to Milton, Dryden, Addison, and Tasso, and a few other of her productions.

== Selected works ==
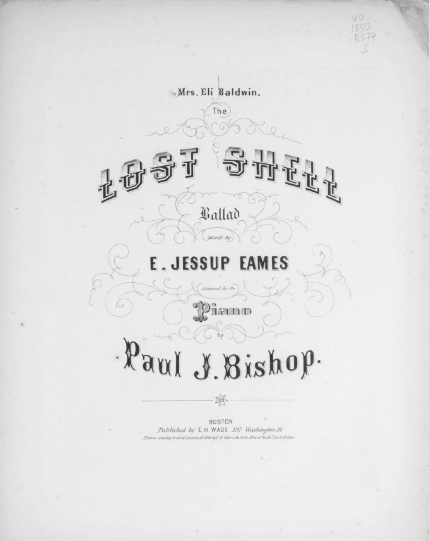
"The Lost Shell Ballad" (1858)

- The Lost Shell Ballad
