= Fred Eames =

American billiards player

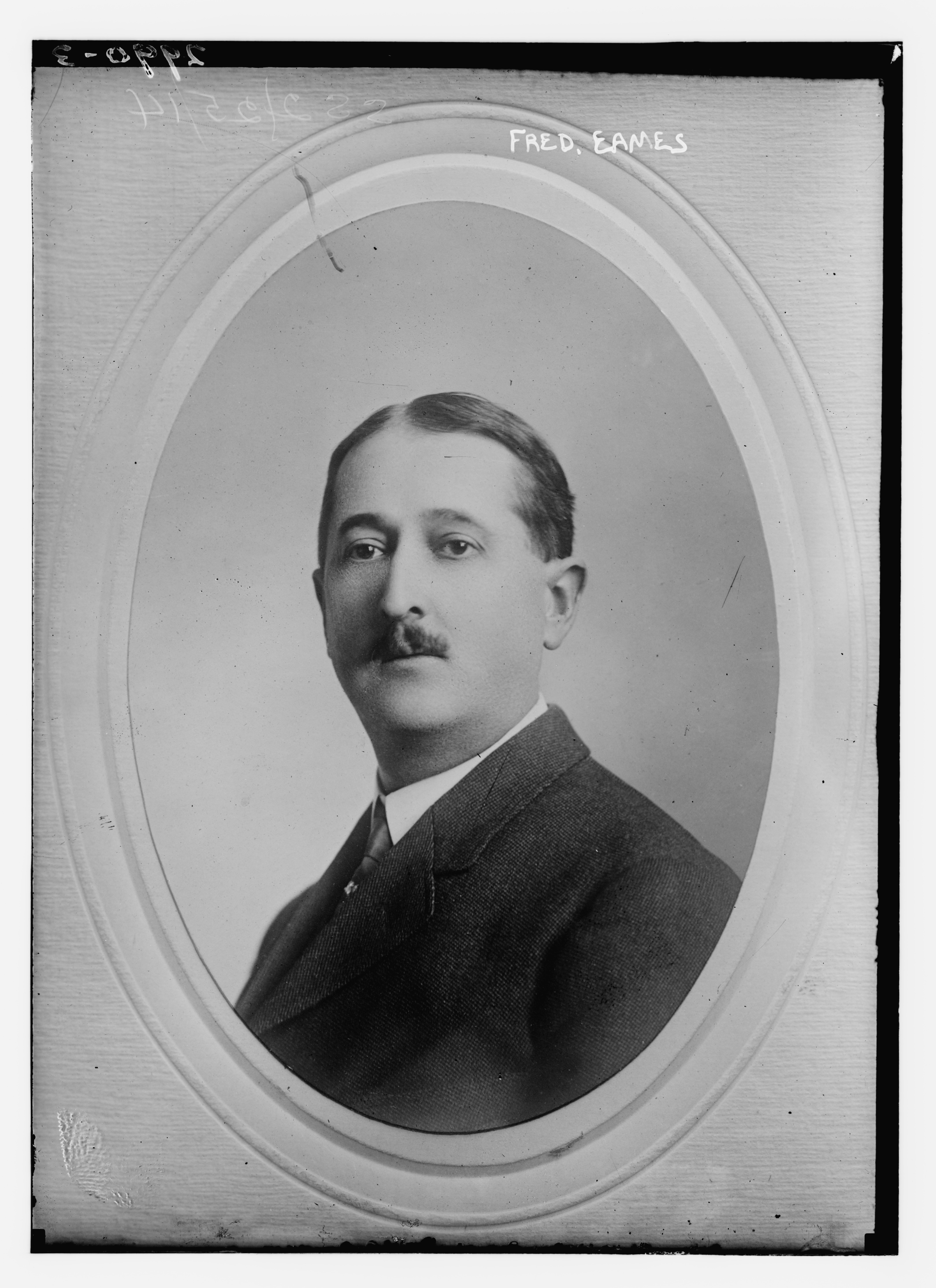

Fred Eames was an American three-cushion billiards champion. In 1910 he defeated Alfredo de Oro for the three-cushion billiards world champion title.
