= John Emes =

English painter

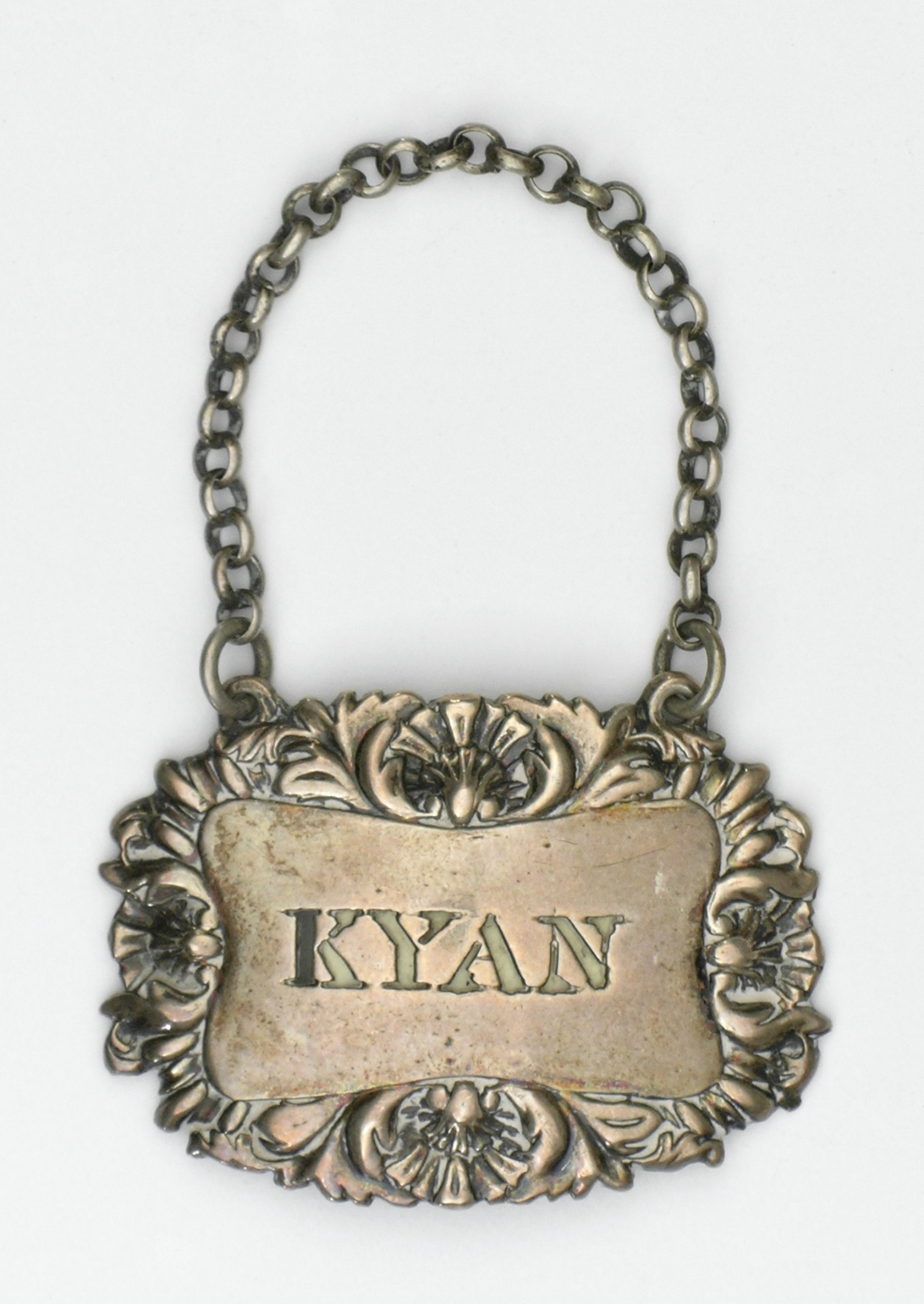
Silver bottle ticket (reading "Kyan") made by John Emes between 1780 and 1810; Los Angeles County Museum of Art

John Emes (1762–1810) was a British engraver and watercolour painter. His wife Rebecca Emes ran a successful silver business after his death.

== Life ==
Emes was born on 30 December 1762 to William Emes, a landscape gardener from Mackworth near Derby.

He is best known by his engraving of the picture by James Jefferys of The Destruction of the Spanish Batteries before Gibraltar. The etching for this is dated 1786, and as it was published in October 1789 by Emes and Elizabeth Woollett, widow of William Woollett it is possible that it was begun by Woollett. Emes was also a water-colour painter, and executed tinted drawings of views in the Lake District and elsewhere, some of which he exhibited at the Royal Academy in 1790 and 1791.

There are three water-colour drawings by Emes in the Print Room at the British Museum, one being a large drawing representing 'The Meeting of the Royal Society of British Archers in Gwersylt Park, Denbighshire;’ the figures in this are drawn by R. Smirke, R.A., and it was afterwards engraved in aquatint by C. Apostool. A set of sixteen views of the lakes in Cumberland and Westmoreland, drawn by J. Smith and J. Emes, were engraved in aquatint by S. Alken; these were incorporated into Thomas West's Guide to the Lakes. Emes also engraved some views of Dorsetshire. His collection of prints was sold on 22 March 1810, after his death.
