= David Eames =

English cricketer

Personal information
- Full name: David George Roniel Eames
- Born: 15 April 1937 (age 89); London Colney, Hertfordshire, England
- Batting: Right-handed
- Bowling: Right-arm medium

Domestic team information
- Years: Team
- 1958: Marylebone Cricket Club

Career statistics
Competition	First-class
Matches	1
Runs scored	21
Batting average	10.50
100s/50s	–/–
Top score	14
Balls bowled	24
Wickets	0
Bowling average	–
5 wickets in innings	–
10 wickets in match	–
Best bowling	–
Catches/stumpings	–/–
- Source: Cricinfo, 22 December 2018

David George Roniel Eames (born 15 April 1937) is an English former first-class cricketer.

Born at London Colney, Ellis made one appearance in first-class cricket for the Marylebone Cricket Club (MCC) against Oxford University at Lord's in 1958. Batting twice in the match, he was dismissed for 14 runs by Andrew Corran in the MCC first-innings, while in their second-innings he was dismissed by Ian Gibson for 7 runs. He also bowled four wicket-less overs.
