= Rebecca Emes =

English silversmith (died 1830)

- Died: 1830
- Known for: Silversmith
- Spouse: John Emes

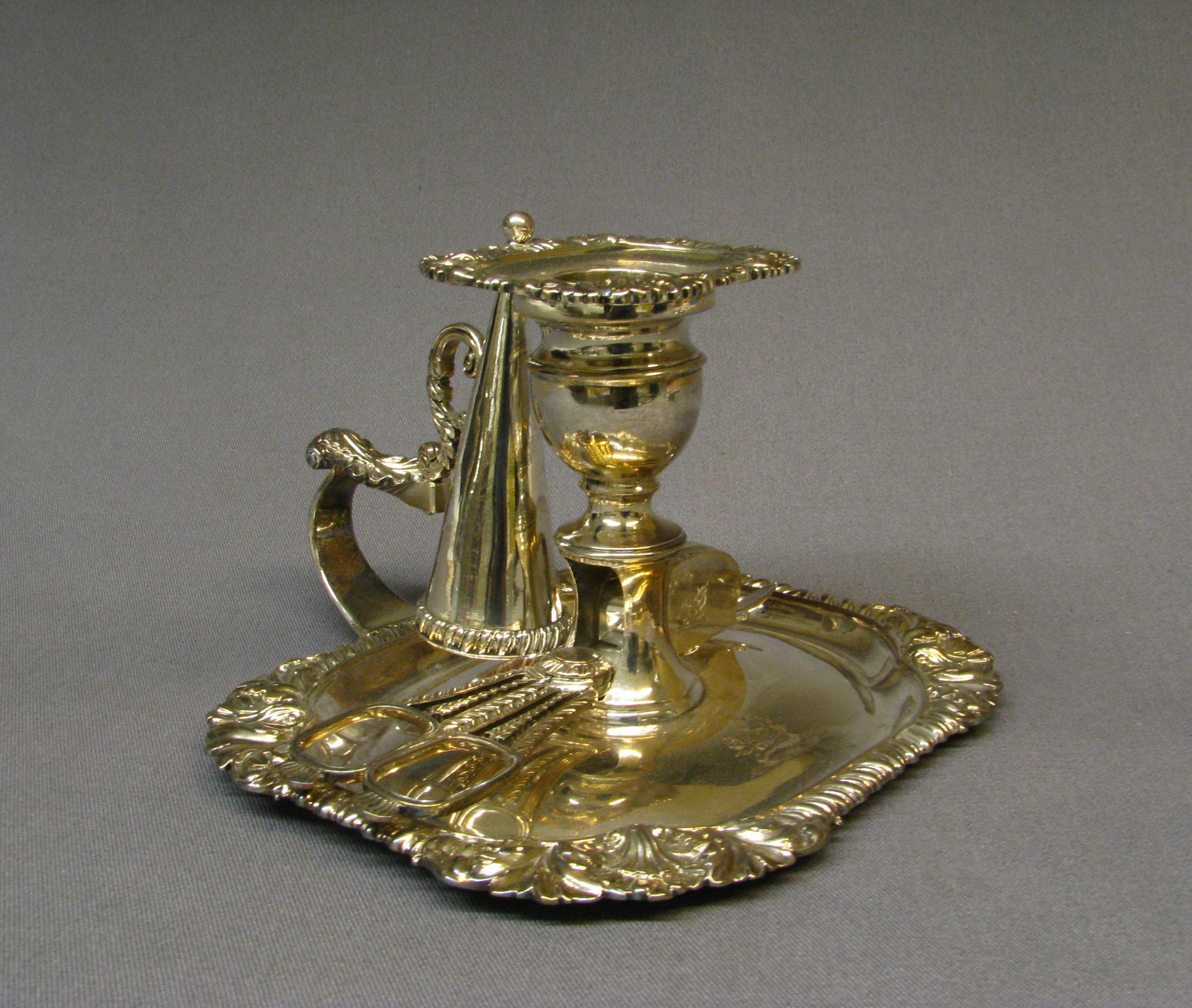
Chamber candlestick by Emes, c. 1817–1818. From the collection of the Met.

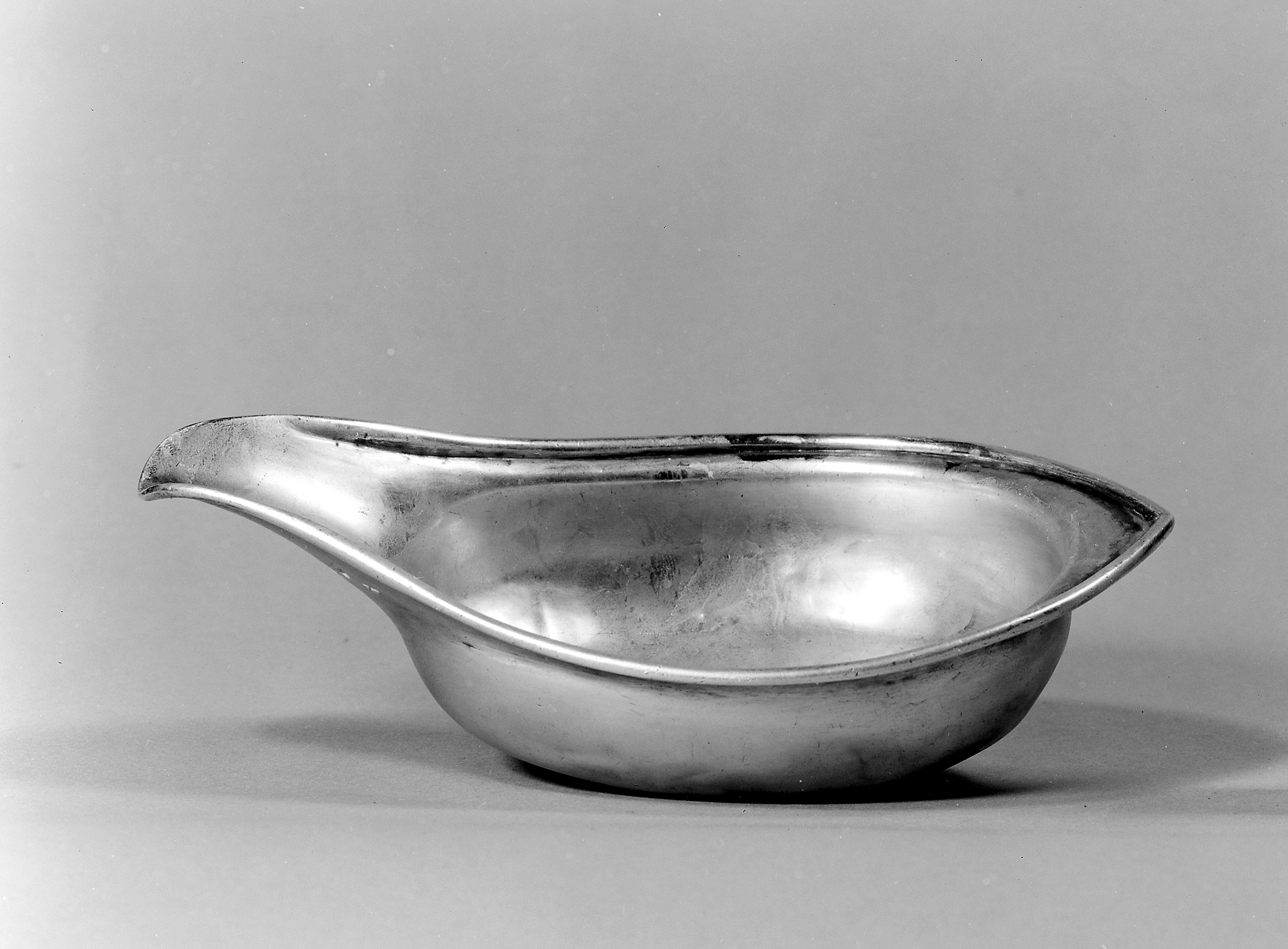
Pap boat by Rebecca Emes, marked 1817-1818

Rebecca Emes (died 1859) was an English silversmith, known for her household silverware.

Little is known of her life. She was born Rebecca Robins in Norfolk, baptised at Wolterton in 1783, daughter of Richard Robins. She married the engraver and watercolour painter John Emes. In 1801. John Emes became partner in the London silversmith company of Thomas Chawner and his son Henry Chawner. The firm specialized in silver tea and coffee services. When the elder Chawner retired, Emes became sole owner and presumably he carried on his own work of creating engravings for publications while Rebecca started to work in the silversmith business. John Emes died in 1808 and Rebecca became a partner with Edward Barnard, the foreman, and Henry Chawner. The firm, which operated under the name Rebecca Emes & Edward Barnard, grew considerably during their tenure. Emes withdrew from the business in 1829.
