= Jane Anthony Eames =

American travel writer

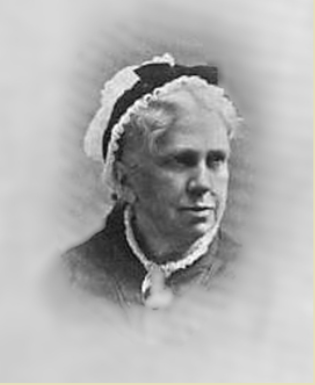
- Born: January 21, 1816; Dighton
- Died: July 8, 1894 (aged 78); Concord

Jane Anthony Eames (January 21, 1816 – July 8, 1894) was an American travel writer.

Jane Anthony was born on January 21, 1816, in Wellington, Massachusetts (now part of the town of Dighton), the daughter of Hezekiah Anthony, a merchant in Providence, Rhode Island, and Sallie Bowers Anthony. She married Rev. James Henry Eames, an Episcopal clergyman who served as rector of St. Stephen's Church in Providence and St. Paul's Church in Concord, New Hampshire. He was also responsible for establishing Episcopal mission churches in New Hampshire's White Mountains region, such as at Littleton and Lancaster.

She wrote a number of travel books about her trips abroad with her husband, including A Budget of Letters (1847), about their trip to Europe, Another Budget (1855), about Egypt and the Middle East, The Budget Closed (1855), and Letters from Bermuda (1875). Eames' "budget" is an obsolete use of the word to refer to a small bag, and is not used in a financial sense.

Eames also wrote books for children and articles for The Providence Journal and the Concord Monitor. Her articles on visiting the White Mountains of New Hampshire, published in The Providence Journal from the late 1850s, were responsible for encouraging tourism in the region.

Eames collected minerals and in 1872 she gave Concord High School a large collection of minerals from around the world.

Jane Anthony Eames died on July 8, 1894, in Concord, New Hampshire.

== Bibliography ==
- A Budget of Letters: or, Things Which I Saw Abroad (1847)
- My Mother's Jewel (1850)
- The Christmas Gift (1851)
- Sarah Barry (1852)
- Home (1853)
- Another Budget: or, Things Which I Saw in the East (1855)
- The Budget Closed (1855)
- Letters from Bermuda (1875)
- Memorial of the Rev. James H. Eames (1878)
- Memorial of Hezekiah Anthony (1885)
