= C. K. Birla =

Indian industrialist and philanthropist (born 1955)

- Born: Chandra Kant Birla; 1955 (age 70–71); Calcutta, West Bengal, India
- Education: La Martiniere; St. Xavier's College, Kolkata
- Occupation: Industrialist
- Title: Chairman, CKA Birla Group (Formerly CK Birla Group)
- Predecessor: Ganga Prasad Birla
- Spouse: Amita Birla
- Children: 2
- Parent(s): Ganga Prasad Birla; Nirmala Devi
- Relatives: See Birla family

Chandra Kant Birla (born 1955) is an Indian industrialist and philanthropist. He is the chairman of the CKA Birla Group (Formerly CK Birla Group).

== Early life ==
Birla was born in 1955 in Kolkata. He completed his schooling at La Martiniere for Boys, Calcutta, and later he graduated with a degree in economics from St. Xavier's College, Kolkata. He is the son of industrialist Ganga Prasad Birla and the grandson of Braj Mohan Birla. He gained business expertise under the guidance of his grandfather, B. M. Birla, regarding him as his mentor.

== Career ==
Birla is chairman of the CKA Birla Group (Formerly CK Birla Group), overseeing its diversified operations across the country.

He is the chairman for various companies under the group umbrella. These include AVTEC, a manufacturer of auto parts, BirlaNu (Formerly HIL Limited), Neosym, National Engineering Industries Limited (manufacturer of NBC Bearings), Orient Electric, and Orient Paper & Industries. He is on the board of directors at Birlasoft.

He is a member of the board of directors of the Commonwealth Business Council, chairman of the board of governors of the Birla Institute of Technology, Ranchi, and a trustee of The Calcutta Medical Research Institute. Birla is a member of the National Committee of the Confederation of Indian Industry (CII). He was also the chairman of the board of governors at the Indian Institute of Management, Udaipur.

Birla was on the board of Century Textile and Industries through his shareholding at Pilani Investment and Industries Corporation, a Birla family holding company.

He was appointed as the chairman of Hindustan Motors in November 1997 and resigned from the chairmanship and directorship in December 2013.

== Philanthropy ==
In healthcare and education, their major initiatives comprise the B.M. Birla Heart Research Centre in Kolkata, Calcutta Medical Research Institute, a hospital in Kolkata, Birla Institute of Technology, Mesra in Ranchi, Modern High School for Girls in Kolkata, and the Rukmani Birla Modern High School in Jaipur.

He oversees the G. P. Birla Archaeological Astronomical and Scientific Research Institute (GPBAASRI), BM Birla Science Centre, and Space Museum in Hyderabad.

In April 2020, Birla, his wife Amita Birla, and the CKA Birla Group (Formerly CK Birla Group) jointly committed a sum of ₹35 crores to support the government's efforts against the COVID-19 pandemic. Of this, ₹25 crores were directed to the PM CARES Fund, with the remaining funds allocated to state government initiatives for the procurement of equipment.

== Personal life ==
In 1975, Birla married Amita Birla, the daughter of Raj Kumar Bagri, a co-founder of the London-based London Metal Exchange and his wife Usha Maheshwary. The couple has two daughters.

== Recognition ==
The World Economic Forum in Davos, Switzerland, honored Birla as a Global Leader for Tomorrow, recognizing him among a select group of industrialists. The Rajasthan Foundation, under the Government of Rajasthan, has listed him among the "Legends of Rajasthan" in the business category.
