= Devapur =

Devpur is another name for Amaravati, the abode of Indra in Hindu mythology.

Devpur may also refer to any of the following places in India:

== Karnataka ==
- Devapur, Bijapur, a village in Bijapur district, Karnataka
- Devapur, Gulbarga, a village in Gulbarga District
- Devapur, Yadgir, a village in Yadgir district

== Maharashtra ==
- Devapur, Vikramgad, a village in Vikramgad taluka (subdistrict)

== Telangana ==
- Devapur, Adilabad district, a census town in Kasipet Mandal, Adilabad District

== See also ==
- Deopur, Bhopal, a village in Madhya Pradesh, India
- Deopur, Sareni, a village in Sareni, Uttar Pradesh, India
- Deopura, a village in Uttar Pradesh, India
- Deopuri, a village in Bachhrawan, Uttar Pradesh, India
- Devapurhatti, a village in Karnataka, India
