= Ganga Prasad Birla =

Industrialist from India

G. P. Birla
- Born: August 2, 1922; Banaras, British India
- Died: March 5, 2010 (aged 87); Kolkata, West Bengal, India
- Family: Birla family
- Awards: 2006 Padma Bhushan

Ganga Prasad Birla (2 August 1922 – 5 March 2010), born in Banaras was an Indian industrialist. Ganga Prasad Birla belonged to Maheshwari Marwari Community from Rajasthan.

== Early life ==
He was the grandson of Baldeo Das Birla, the son of Brij Mohan Birla and the father of CK Birla. In 1940, he became the first graduate in the Birla family.

== Career ==
He joined the board of in 1942 and later became its chairman in 1957. He began his innings in the group flagship, Hindustan Motors in 1969 and became its chairman in 1982. He also founded Hyderabad Industries Limited and many academic institutions such as Birla Institute of Technology, Birla Archaeological and Cultural Research Institute, Modern High School for Girls, Kolkata, and hospitals such as BM Birla Heart Research Institute and Calcutta Medical Research Institute. He built temples in Hyderabad, Jaipur and Bhopal, and supported the renovation of places of historical, architectural and religious importance. He gradually pulled out of active business life after his second heart attack in 1981. He still came to the office for as long as he could, but responsibilities had long been farmed out to his son CK Birla.

Birla was awarded the Padma Bhushan in 2006 for his contributions to society and the field of education.

== See also ==
- CK Birla Group
- NBC Bearings
- Orient Electric
