= CKA Birla Group =

Indian multinational conglomerate

- Formerly: CK Birla Group
- Type: Private
- Industry: Conglomerate
- Founded: 1862; 164 years ago
- Founder: Seth Shiv Narayan Birla
- Headquarters: Birla Tower; Barakhamba Road, New Delhi, India
- Area served: Worldwide
- Key people: C. K. Birla (Chairman); Amita Birla (Co-chairman)
- Revenue: ▲US$3 billion (2024)
- Owner: C. K. Birla, Amita Birla
- Number of employees: 35,000+
- Subsidiaries: Birlasoft; Orient Electric
- Website: ckabirlagroup.com

CKA Birla Group (previously CK Birla Group) is an Indian multinational conglomerate, headquartered in New Delhi. The group has been historically led by industrialists Braj Mohan Birla and Ganga Prasad Birla. It has a presence in technology, automotive, home and building, healthcare, and education sectors,

In 2023, CKA Birla Group was listed among the International Sponsors of War by the Ukrainian National Agency on Corruption Prevention due to its business with Russia during the Russian invasion of Ukraine.

In the automotive sector, the group has been associated with manufacturing partnerships including a joint venture with Groupe PSA (later Stellantis) related to Citroën’s operations in India.

As of 2024, it includes over 35,000 employees, 52 manufacturing facilities, and operations across five continents. In the fiscal year 2023, the company reported a total revenue of approximately US$3 billion.

== History ==
CKA Birla Group was founded by Seth Shiv Narayan Birla in 1862. In 1939, the group established Orient Paper in Brajarajnagar, Odisha, which went on to become India's largest paper company. In 1946, National Engineering Industries (NEI) was founded, followed by the acquisition of Neosym, previously known as Indian Smelting & Refining Company, in 1947.

In 1948, Braj Mohan Birla started the operations of Hindustan Motors, an automotive company that he founded in West Bengal. Known for producing the Ambassador car, widely used as a taxicab and government limousine, Hindustan Motors held the position of India's largest car manufacturer until the rise of Maruti Udyog.

Under Ganga Prasad Birla's leadership, the group ventured into project management by acquiring the three-million-tonne Ajaokuta steel project from the Nigerian government, which was facing operational challenges at the time. It undertook the modernization of integrated steel plants owned by the state-operated Steel Authority of India Limited in Durgapur and Rourkela.

Subsequent acquisitions included Orient Fans (1954) and HIL (1956). In the 1990s, the C K Birla Group had a 50:50 joint venture with General Motors, which ended in 1999 when GM acquired 86%, and Holden took 14% of the Indian production facilities.

It expanded in cement (Orient Cement, 1982) and information technology (Birlasoft, 1995). Institutions like Birla Science Centre and BM Birla Heart Research Centre were founded in 1985 and 1989, respectively. AVTEC, an automotive component manufacturer, was formed in 2005. The group acquired Switzerland-based ASSAG in 2013 and EnablePath in 2014 by Birlasoft.

In 2017 group entities have been associated with manufacturing joint ventures linked to Groupe PSA (later Stellantis) for powertrain production and vehicle manufacturing in India, supporting Citroën’s operations in the country.

In 2018, HIL acquired Germany-based Parador Holdings GmbH, a manufacturer of flooring products for $96.5 million in July 2018. In 2020, National Engineering Industries (NEI) acquired Slovakia-based Kinex Bearings through its European subsidiary. During the same period, HIL divested its thermal insulation business to Imerys SA for US$11.26 million (₹80 crore). In 2022, HIL acquired Fast Build Blocks, an Odisha-based building materials company for ₹65 crore.

In 2024, Hyderabad Industries Limited (HIL) was rebranded as BirlaNu Limited as part of a restructuring of the group’s building products business. Through 2024–2026, the group continued operations across its core sectors, including automotive components, software services through Birlasoft, industrial products, building materials, and consumer electricals, while maintaining international manufacturing and distribution operations.

== Companies ==
=== Birlasoft ===
In 1995, the CKA Birla Group started its information technology company Birlasoft. In 2019, Birlasoft and KPIT Technologies underwent a merger and demerger. The IT services arm of KPIT Technologies merged with Birlasoft in January 2019. Birlasoft operates in IT services, while KPIT Technologies focuses on automotive engineering.

=== BirlaNu (formerly HIL Limited) ===
BirlaNu, formerly Hyderabad Industries Limited, is the owner of brands such as Charminar (asbestos based cement sheets), Birla Aerocon (AAC Blocks), and Charminar Fortune (Asbestos free roofing sheets). The company operates in the construction materials, machinery, industrial supplies, components, and logistics network domains. HIL Limited operates in India and Germany. BirlaNu (HIL Limited) has been at the centre of many controversies over the years related to its use of asbestos in its key offering - Charminar. Despite the known ill effects and carcinogenic properties of asbestos, Asbestos sheets are still the largest offering of the organisation.

=== Orient Electric ===
Orient Electric, previously known as Calcutta Electrical Manufacturing Company, was acquired by Orient Paper in 1954. The company operates in two segments, Electrical Consumer Durables (ECD) and Lighting and Switchgear. It is one of the largest manufacturers of fans in India. The company operates manufacturing facilities in Faridabad, Haryana, Noida, Hyderabad and Kolkata, and has a presence in the North and Western markets in India.

=== CK Birla Healthcare ===
The company operates two CK Birla Hospital locations in Delhi NCR, one in Punjabi Bagh and the other in Gurugram. The company operates fertility clinics under the name Birla Fertility & IVF, specializing in in-vitro fertilization (IVF), egg freezing, and fertility testing.

=== GMMCO Limited ===
GMMCO was established in 1967 through the acquisition of Blackwood Hodge Equipment, the then distributor of Terex products, by the CKA Birla Group. It is primarily engaged in the sale and overall support of construction machines, mining equipment, and engine power systems for industrial, governmental, marine, coal mining and oil and gas applications. In 1986, it became the Indian dealer for the American heavy-duty machinery manufacturer Caterpillar Inc. It is headquartered in Chennai and has offices, workshops and repair facilities in 14 Indian states. In January 2014, it acquired Bucyrus India, a division of Caterpillar Inc., for an undisclosed sum. GMMCO has also partnered with companies such as Perkins, JLG and Schneider Electric. It has also partnered with German company Hauhinco to form Gmmco Technology Services (GTS) in 2022, which focusses on mining planning and engineering solutions.

=== National Engineering Industries ===
National Engineering Industries (NEI) was founded in 1946 and is engaged in the manufacturing of bearings for the automotive, railway, industrial, and aerospace industries. It sells bearings under the brand name NBC Bearings and exports them to over 20 countries, including the United States, Germany, Brazil, Japan, and Australia. In January 2020, NEI completed the acquisition of Kinex Bearings, a Slovakia-based company.

The company has a rubber division called NEI Rubber, which operates under the National Engineering Industries.

=== Orient Paper & Industries ===
Orient Paper & Industries is a manufacturer of writing, printing, industrial, and specialty papers. The company was incorporated in 1939. It started as a paper maker and later expanded into cement and fans. In 2011, Orient Paper spun off its cement business, resulting in the establishment of Orient Cement. Subsequently, in 2016, the company demerged its electrical appliances division, resulting in the establishment of Orient Electric.

=== Avtec ===
Founded in 2005, Avtec is a manufacturer of powertrain and precision-engineered products, supplying high-precision components to automotive, off-highway, agriculture, and railway industries. Its manufacturing units are situated in Hosur, Chennai, and Pithampur in India.

=== Neosym Industry ===
Neosym Industry Limited is a metal manufacturing company established in 1932 as The Indian Smelting and Refining Company Limited. It was acquired by the CKA Birla Group in 1947. It produces grey and SG iron castings for automotive, agriculture, earthmoving, and engineering industries. Its manufacturing unit, located in Pune, India, has a production capacity of 70,800 metric tons per annum.

=== Orient Cement ===
Orient Cement had manufacturing facilities in Devapur (Telangana), Yadgir (Karnataka), and Nashirabad (Maharashtra). With a total cement production capacity of 3.4 million tpa, the company marketed its products under the brands Orient, Majbooti, and Birla Excel. Founded in 1979, Orient Cement was originally part of Orient Paper & Industries. It commenced cement production in 1982 at Devapur in the Adilabad district of Telangana. In 2024, the CKA Birla Group sold Orient Cement to Ambuja Cements.

== Philanthropy ==
The CKA Birla Group engaged in philanthropic activities in science, technology, art, culture, and heritage preservation, and development of rural and underprivileged communities in India.

The company runs various hospital trusts, including the B.M. Birla Heart Research Centre (Specialty hospital) and the Calcutta Medical Research Institute in Kolkata (Multispeciality hospital), Rukmani Birla Hospital in Jaipur, and education institutes like BIT Mesra in Ranchi, Rukmani Birla Modern High School in Jaipur, and Modern High School for Girls and Modern High School International in Kolkata.

It has set up institutions like the G P Birla Archaeological Astronomical and Scientific Research Institute (GPBAASRI), BM Birla Science Centre, B. M. Birla Science Museum in Hyderabad, Birla Institute of Scientific Research and BM Birla Planetarium in Jaipur. Ganga Prasad Birla constructed temples in Hyderabad, Jaipur, Amlai, and Bhopal, and contributed to the restoration of historically and religiously significant sites. The Birla temples in Brajarajnagar, Odisha were founded by Braj Mohan Birla.

In April 2020, CK Birla Group and its promoters jointly committed ₹35 crores to support the Government of India's COVID-19 efforts, directing ₹25 crores to the PM CARES Fund and allocating the remaining funds for state government initiatives in equipment procurement.

== Awards ==
In 2006, the Government of India conferred the Padma Bhushan, the third-highest civilian honor, upon Ganga Prasad Birla, the company's former chairman, in recognition of his contributions to social work.

== Controversies ==
- In 2023, NBC Bearings, a CKA Birla Group' company filled the gap in Russia's bearing imports after Western manufacturers ceased sales following Russia's full-scale invasion of Ukraine. This halted operations at key tank factories like Uralvagonzavod and Omsktransmash. To overcome the shortfall, the company stepped in and accounted for 38.4% of Russia's imports, totaling $12.3 million from April 2022 to March 2023. The Ukrainian government's National Agency on Corruption Prevention included the company on its "War & Sanctions" portal as International Sponsors of War, specifically naming key management figures: Rohit Saboo, Sanjiv Taparia, Gaurav Chaturvedi, Shailesh Patni and Rajan Jain.
