= India's Great Driving Challenge =

The Great Driving Challenge was a 2009 online reality show and marketing program created by Hindustan Motors Limited, in India, where the top three finalists or couples got an opportunity to drive a Mitsubishi Cedia Sport. It ran from June through August 2009.

The finalists were selected by the jury members and given the opportunity to drive the Mitsubishi Cedia Sport to cover a minimum distance of 3000 km over 10 days.

Among the finalists, one winner was determined on the basis of their daily web-posts, photo/ videos uploaded and regular internet updates during the course of their 10 days driving challenge (also, called the ‘Drive Phase’). The winner will get a prize money of Rs 10 lakhs (roughly US$25,000).

The contest encouraged couples to apply online. The three selected couples went on an all expenses paid challenge in a customized Mitsubishi Cedia Sports for twelve days. On completion of the challenge, one couple was chosen as the winner based on the blogs and the experiences they shared online, and took home one million rupees as prize.

The team of "One Foot Wild", Radhika Raj and Bharath Belliappa, were announced as the winners in August.

The judging panel consisted of Mr. Adil Jal Darukhanawala, editor of Zigwheels, the official media partner of the contest, Ms. Tanya Chaitanya, Editor Femina and others.

== First stage ==
In the first stage which started on 22 June 2009 applicants had to register themselves and collect votes. The first stage came to an end on 17 July. From here on the jury members selected the top 100 couples on the basis of some set criteria. Some "cutoff" filters were used to come up with a first shortlist of few hundred applicants, who were then scored by multiple members of the jury. A few applicants were disqualified after examination of their email logs.

Each jury member had access to a web-based scoring sheet. Each criterion was scored separately by one ore more members of Jury, before arriving at total score and final average. The Jury reviewed the TOP 100 list, before releasing it for announcement. The jury later said, "We are aware that there are many excellent bloggers, photographers and passionate travel enthusiasts who did not make it to the final 100."

The jury increased the chances of shortlisting good applications, to the maximum, by:

(a) Expanding cut-off filter to more than70% (that means we looked at all applications which were 70% complete or more) - to be more inclusive.

(b) Lowering the votes threshold to as low as 30 (anyone with number of votes lower than 30, demonstrated lack of enthusiasm to participate) - to be more inclusive

(c) Lowering the testimonials threshold (for same reason) - to be more inclusive

(d) Relaxing requirement of Google Map - to be more inclusive

Relaxing the cutoff filters meant there were more candidates the jury had to contend with - thus more effort.

== Second stage ==
The top 100 couples were announced on 20 July. With this announcement the verification process got underway. Results of the top 9 from amongst the 100 contestants will be announced on 23 July. The 100 contestants selected will qualify for the next round where verification and validation of the information provided by them will be done in order to select the top 9 Nominees. The 100 Contestants will be called to verify their identity. The 100 contestants are asked to e-mail/ courier/ fax their valid ID proofs mentioned under within two days: 1. Driving license (Light Motor Vehicle) 2. PAN card 3. Residence proof (such as passport, ration card or, voter ID, electricity bill or phone bill)

The evaluation by jury in this stage is based on: 1. Photos & videos uploaded by the contestants in their application. 2. Writing i.e. the travelogues, past experiences, etc. 3. Blogs (Content and presentation)

The initial Jury shall rate all the contestants and arrive at the common set comprising 25 couples. For the short listed 25 contestants, ground verification will be carried out. The agreements will be signed by the contestants at this stage and documentation and applications submitted earlier will be evaluated by an initial jury by a telephonic interview to evaluate the suitability of the contestants for the event and will shortlist nine nominees at the end of this phase along with a suitable number of stand-byes.

== Third stage ==
The nine short listed nominees will be informed about their qualification to the next phase through telephone or E-mail or both and a selection confirmation letter will be sent to the selected nine nominees which will include, schedule for the audition, tentative stay period for the audition, documents required to be carried for the audition, and details of their travel proposal for Great Driving Challenge.

The Nominees will be put through audition activities across three days. As a part of the audition, the nominees will be required to participate in a series of activities for which they will be evaluated by the initial jury. These activities will test the driving, photography and aptitude test of the nominees. After a series of tasks and evaluations, a press conference will be held where the three finalists will be announced to the media in the presence of representatives of the organisers, facilitators and jury members.

== Winning couple ==
The three finalists were awarded an all expenses-paid trip in a Mitsubishi Cedia Sports car. It started and ended in Mumbai, and drivers had to cover a minimum of 3,000 kilometres in 10 days.

The finalists were required to post and update their daily experiences through a minimum of five still photographs, a video and five blogs. On the website profile of the finalists, visitors rated the pictures and blogs. The finalists had an interactive session with the final jury at the end of the drive phase. The winner was determined based on number of posts (videos/ blogs/ pictures) uploaded, quality of posts, and the score given by the final jury and the profile visitors.
