= Revolo =

Revolo is a plug-in parallel hybrid technology that can be retrofitted in both existing and new cars. This technology can also be used in buses and trucks. The technology was developed by KPIT Technologies and the product will be manufactured through a joint venture between Bharat Forge and KPIT. As part of the joint venture, KPIT will license the hybrid technology while Bharat Forge will provide manufacturing, assembly, and integration.

Pre-compliance tests conducted at the Automotive Research Association of India (ARAI), Pune have confirmed that the technology provides fuel efficiency improvements by over 40 percent and a reduction in greenhouse gas (GHG) emissions by over 30%.

The technology is to be marketed to OEMs and individual vehicle owners through a network of dealerships.

== Background ==
=== Planning and concept ===
The idea of Revolo first occurred to Tejas Kshatriya in 2008 when he was stuck in Mumbai traffic en route to Pune.

KPIT sanctioned a team of four engineers for the project, which was kept separate from CREST, the research and development center at KPIT. It took 2 years of research and a budget under US$2 million to evolve the idea through trial and error and several failures, including the inability of the system to withstand a sudden surge in power when brakes were applied.

The research and development team studied the firing pattern of internal combustion engines and identified the weak spots that lead to fuel waste and created a technology that can convert a passenger car to a hybrid that is environmentally friendly, cheap, fuel-efficient, and at the same time offers good performance.

Revolo is designed to work in typical stop-and-go city traffic and allows cars to cruise at about 30 km/h in the third gear without straining the engine.

=== Latest developments ===
KPIT continues the road tests of pilot vehicles as well as consumer trials with results so far having validated the pre-announced performance results. The team has further reduced the overall weight of the solution, improved its durability, and standardized many components across multiple vehicle platforms. Construction at the assembly and manufacturing plants continues. It is expected to be operational by March 2014.

The company will test various vehicles, including passenger cars, with engine sizes between 800 ccs and 2,500 ccs.

Production of limited hybrid kits is planned to start by the first half of 2012. The commercial production would begin in 2012–13.

== Technology ==
=== Revolo technology details ===
The Revolo kit is similar to a retrofit compressed natural gas (CNG) kit which contains all required mechanical and electrical components in the package.

The kit can be installed in both petrol and diesel vehicles within 4–6 hours by trained technicians who will be trained by a joint venture that KPIT has formed with Bharat Forge.

The Revolo kit comprises a 7.5 to 10 horsepower electric motor developed and patented by KPIT, an electronic motor controller, lead–acid battery pack, mechanical assembly, and coupling, proprietary software for control algorithms of the motor and batteries, and battery management system.

As a parallel hybrid, the motor and engine will work simultaneously and as a plug-in, the vehicle can be charged through a standard external electricity source such as a domestic power outlet. Unlike an electric vehicle, the vehicle will operate as a conventional fuel vehicle even if the batteries are completely drained.

=== Plug-in parallel hybrid conversion kit ===
The conversion kit is a lot less complex and light in weight in the context of the moving engine components which effectively enhances the fuel efficiency to twice as compared to existing solutions.

Battery specifications: The solution is battery agnostic. It can be adapted to work with various types of batteries such as lead–acid batteries or Lithium-ion batteries. The solution typically produces 60 volts from five valve-regulated, lead–acid batteries, and can be recharged from the standard Indian household current of 230 volts in 4 to 6 hours.

Revolo also consists of an in-built device that recognizes driving patterns and self-adjusts them to provide optimum efficiency in stop-and-go traffic situations.

=== Pricing ===
Revolo is said to be 80 percent cheaper as compared to the after-market hybrid car kits available in the United States which cost around US$20,000. It can be retrofitted into any vehicle at an average cost of Rs. 100,000.
