= Brij Mohan =

Brij Mohan may refer to:

- Brij Mohan Kaul (1912–1972), Indian general
- Brij Mohan Birla (1904–1981), Indian businessperson and descendant of the Birla family
- Brij Mohan Amar Rahe, a 2018 Indian Hindi-language action comedy film
