= Moti Dungri =

Sri Moti Dungri Ganesh Ji Mandir (Jaipur)
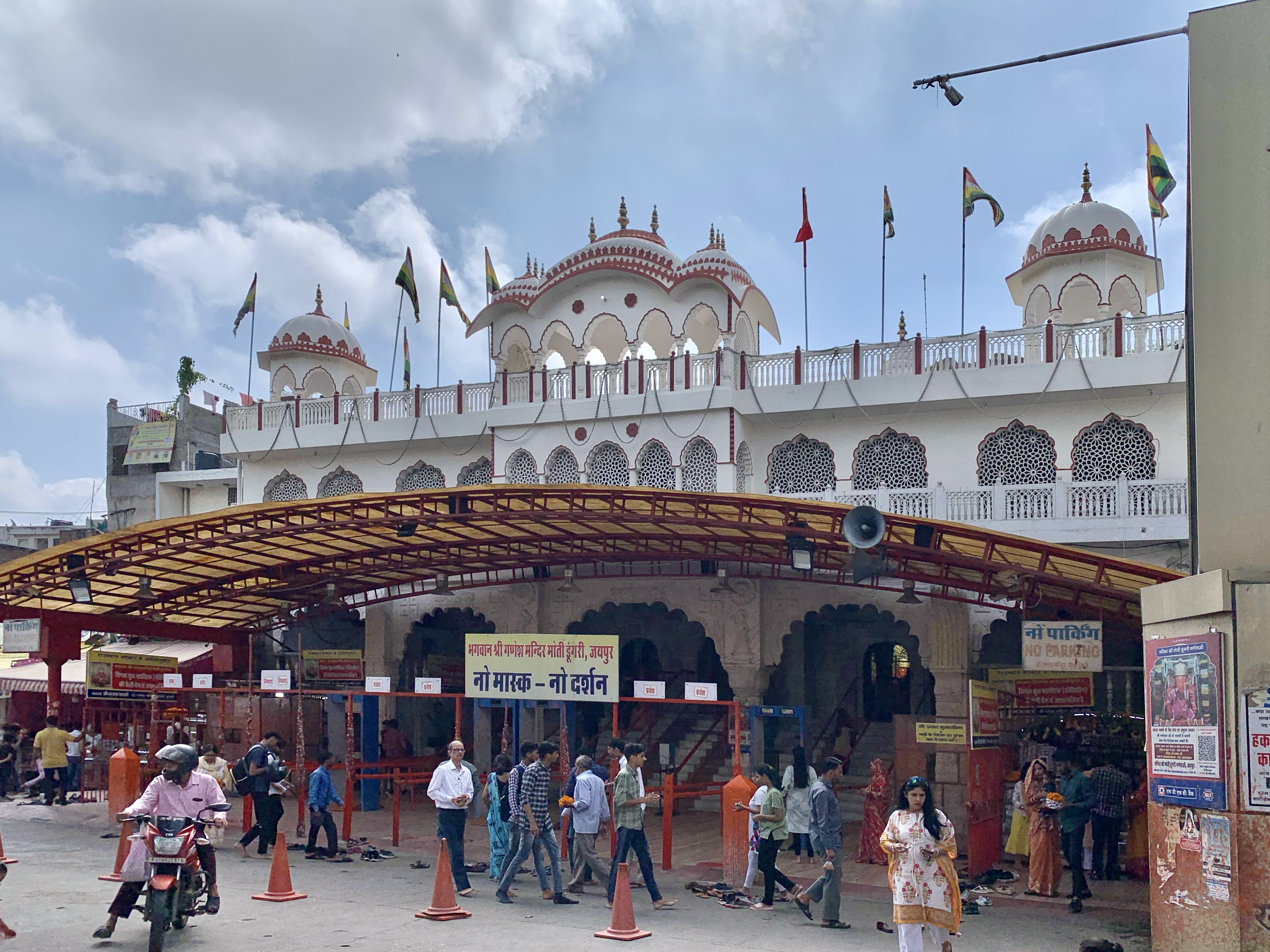
- Exterior of the temple

- Location within Jaipur Location within Rajasthan Location within India

Religion
- Affiliation: Hinduism
- District: Jaipur
- Deity: Ganesha

Location
- State: Rajasthan
- Country: India
- Interactive map of Sri Moti Dungri Ganesh Ji Mandir (Jaipur)
- Coordinates: 26.894621°N 75.816740°E

Architecture
- Creator: Seth Jai Ram Paliwal
- Established: 1761

Website
- www.motidungri.com

Moti Dungri is a Hindu temple complex dedicated to Lord Ganesha in Jaipur, Rajasthan. It was built in 1761 under supervision of Seth Jai Ram Paliwal. The temple is a popular tourist attraction in the city and is located next to the Birla Temple.

== History ==
The Moti Dungri temple is situated at bottom of the Moti Dungri hill and the fort of Moti Dungri in Jaipur, Rajasthan. The icon of the god Ganesha established in the temple is said to be more than five-hundred years old, and was brought here in 1761 by Seth Jai Ram Paliwal who was accompanying Maharaja Madho Singh I, from Udaipur. He was brought to Udaipur from Gujarat. The temple was built under Paliwal's supervision.

The trunk of the sindoor-coloured Ganesha icon is rightwards. Devotees offer laddo sweets, at least, 1.25 lakh devotees pay respect to Ganesha every year. A fair is organized every Wednesday in the temple complex.

There is a lingam (icon of the god Shiva) in the Moti Dungri Fort complex, which open to visitors once a year on Mahashivratri, the festival of Shiva. The Birla Mandir shrine dedicated to the deities Lakshmi Narayan is situated south of Ganesha temple.

== Festival ==
The Moti Dungri Ganeshji Temple is a popular destination for celebrating Ganesh Chaturthi. In 2023, the temple hosted a large display of laddus, which are a traditional offering to Ganesha. The display featured two laddus weighing 251 kilograms and two laddus weighing 200 kilograms. The laddus were made from a variety of ingredients, including flour, sugar, and nuts. They were offered to Ganesha by devotees from all over the city.

== Architecture ==
The layout and structure of Moti Dungri is built in the Nagara style and is based on the model of Scottish castle. There are three entrance gates and few steps at the front. It was built using limestone and marble and construction work was completed in 4 months.

== Darshan Timings ==
Moti Dungri Temple located in Jaipur is open for devotees all through the week.

Sr.No.	Dharshans	Time
1.	Mangala Aarti	4.00 am
2.	Special Puja	11.20 am
3.	Shringar Aarti	11.30 am
4.	Bhog Aarti	2.15pm
5.	Evening Aarti	7:00 p.m.
6.	Shayan Aarti	11.45 pm

== Transport ==
The temple is 6-km distant from Jaipur. Jaipur International Airport is the nearest airport and the Gandhi Nagar, nearest railway station.
