= Nashirabad =

- Town
- Location in Maharashtra, India
- Coordinates: 21°00′00″N 75°40′00″E
- Country: India
- State: Maharashtra
- District: Jalgaon
- Elevation: 206 m (676 ft)

Population
  - Total: 26,131(2,011)

Languages
  - Official: Marathi
- Time zone: UTC+5:30 (IST)
- PIN: 425309

Nashirabad is a small town in Jalgaon district in the northern Maharashtra state in India. It was named after Nasiruddin Badshah. The earlier name of the town was Solnimbhore. This was due to fact that the town had 16 Hanuman temples and 16 main doors.

== Demographics and economy ==
The population includes Wani, Brahmins, Leva Patil, Mali, and Teli, who run many businesses. The main business is the farming of banana trees and sugar cane.

Nashirabad is on National Highway No. 6 (Surat-Kolkata National Highway) and has many warehouses of local products.

== Transport ==
Most people depend on public transport (MSRTC), commonly known as "ST", and private hire vehicles like auto-rickshaw for commuting to and from district and taluka places like Jalgaon and Bhusawal. All the MSRTC buses except express bus services stop at Nashirabad bus stand. The nearest bus depots are at Jalgaon and Bhusawal.

Nearest railway stations are:

- Bhadli 2.5 km (halt for passenger trains only)
- Jalgaon 10 km (express and passenger halt)
- Bhusawal 16 km (all trains halt)

== Religion ==
=== Temples ===
- Shri Vishnu Mandir Devasthan was established in 1725. This temple had been situated at Nashirabad since the time of Pesheve. Shri Vishnu Mandir Devasthan was built as per direction of Honorary Magistrate Kai. Amrutrao Deshpande.
- Shri. Ganpati Mandir Mandir, Indira Chowk,
- Navnath Maharaj Mandir, sunasgon rood, Nasirabad
- Vitthal Mandir - at Down Lane, Holi Maidan
- Balabhim Vyayamshala
- Anna Maharaj Math
- Sawata Maharaj Manidr - Upper Lane
- Ram Mandir
- Bavani Mandir
- Mukteshwar Mandir
- Mahalakshmi Mandir
- Ganpati Mandir (Tarsod 2.5 km from village)
- Neemjay Mata Bhavani's Mandir
- Dnyaneshwar maharaj mandir.
- Shree Krishna Mandir
- Ram Peth
- Ganpati Mandir (Nashirabad)
- Indira Gandhi Chowk
- Marimata Mandir (Ravindra Bhagvan Javre)
- Anna maharaj Mandir, near Grampanchayat
- Mahalaxmi Mandir
- Mhasoba dev sthan

=== Mosques ===
- Jaama Masjid - Emam Ahmad Raza Road
- Sunni Kaali Masjid - Choupal Mohalla
- Mirzaani Masjid - Haidar Ali Mohalla
- Peer Shahabuddin Masjid - Emam Ahmad Raza road
- Momin Masjid -Momin mohalla upras
- Momin Masjid - Rehmatpura
- Abu Bakar Masjid - Manyar Mohalla
- Khwaja Masjid - Khwaja Garib Nawaz Nagar
- Khatoon-e-Jannat Masjid - Taaj Nagar

== Areas ==
- Varchi Aali (Upper Lane) Varchi Ali Area - Most people of Mali, and the most people Muslim Manyar and Maratha Samaj. The oldest temples of Shree Sant Sawatha Mali Maharaj and Shri Datta Mandir are attractive temples in the area. The area is divided as Patil wada, Naik Vada, Mahajan Wada, Ganpat Dula Wada, Varcha Wada, Mari Mata Wada and Sant Sawatha Mali Nagar.
- Madhli Aali (Middle Lane) Saati Bazar, Ram Peth, Ram Mandir, Isane Wada, Sadaphale Wada.
- Khalchi Aali (Down Lane) - Most Case As Leva Patidar and his Occupation Farming, The area includes chaudhari wada, bajar patta, holi maiden, and dabepur wada.
