= Ravi Pandit =

Indian businessman (died 2026)

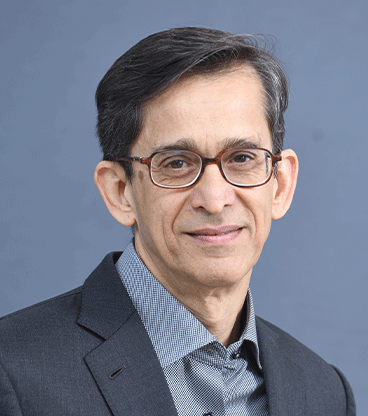
- Born: Shashi Shekhar Balkrishna Pandit; 1950 or 1951; Poona, Bombay State, India
- Died: 8 May 2026 (aged 75); Pune, Maharashtra, India
- Education: MIT Sloan School of Management
- Occupations: Chairman and Group CEO, KPIT Technologies; Board of directors, Thermax Group

Ravi Pandit (1950 or 1951 – 8 May 2026) was an Indian businessman who was the co-founder and chairman of KPIT Technologies.

== Life and career ==
Pandit was born to an affluent Marathi family in Pune, Maharashtra State, India. Pandit earned his master's degree in Management from MIT Sloan School of Management. He was a fellow member of the Institute of Chartered Accountants of India and an associate member of the Institute of Cost Accountants of India. He served as president of the Maratha Chamber of Commerce, Industries and Agriculture from 2004 to 2006.

He promoted the Zero Garbage Project in Pune, partnering with Pune Municipal Corporation through Janwani Foundation for which he served as the member of board of trustees.

Pandit died on 8 May 2026, at the age of 75.

== Publications ==
- Mashelkar, R. A.; Pandit, Ravi (2018). From Leapfrogging to Pole-vaulting: Creating the Magic of Radical Yet Sustainable Transformation. ISBN 9789353053895.
