= Citroën India =

Indian branch of the French automobile brand

- Type: Joint venture
- Industry: Automotive
- Founded: 2019
- Headquarters: Tiruvallur, Chennai
- Products: Automobiles
- Production output: 9,488 (FY 2024)
- Owner: Citroën
- Parent: Stellantis N.V.
- Website: www.citroen.in

Citroën is a French automobile brand founded in 1919 by André Citroën. It was part of the PSA Group until 2021. In 2021, PSA merged with Fiat Chrysler Automobiles to form Stellantis, Citroën's current parent company.

In 2019, the erstwhile PSA group launched the Citroën brand in India along with manufacturing operations through a vehicle assembly plant in Thiruvallur and a powertrain facility in Hosur (both via JVs with CK Birla Group). Consequently, the Stellantis group increased its investment in the JVs with CK Birla and is now a majority shareholder. The Thiruvallur facility produces the C5 Aircross SUV, C3, ë-C3, Aircross & the Basalt for Citroën India. The Hosur plant builds gearboxes primarily for exports and manufactures engines for domestic needs and exports.

== History ==
The launch of the Citroën brand in India was the third attempt by Groupe PSA to enter the Indian market. During the presentation of FY18 results of Groupe PSA, the chairman confirmed that Citroën was the chosen brand to enter the Indian markets.

Groupe PSA had signed two joint ventures with companies of India's CK Birla Group for vehicle assembly, distribution and powertrain manufacturing of its cars in the country. The French carmaker was initially supposed to enter the Indian market in 2020. However, the plan was delayed amidst the COVID-19 pandemic and the subsequent lockdown.

Prior to launching the India-spec C5 Aircross SUV, Citroën India's research revealed that comfort is the critical criteria for new car buyers in India. Production of the C5 Aircross started in January 2021 at the Tiruvallur plant in Tamil Nadu. Groupe PSA made an investment of around Rs.2500 crore to enter the Indian market.

In 2023, Citroën's sales in India declined from 9062 vehicles to 8,367 in 2023–24. The company's initial models received a limited market response, partly because they lacked features available in competing vehicles.

In March 2024, the India-manufactured Citroën ë-C3 received a zero-star rating for adult occupant protection and one star for child occupant protection in Global NCAP crash testing.

== Products ==
Citroën India is developing several models specifically for the Indian market, including EVs. The C5 Aircross was unveiled on 1 February 2021 and launched on 7 April 2021 in two variants: Feel and Shine, with single and dual tone interiors, equipped with a 2.0-litre diesel engine. According to reports, subsequent cars will not support a diesel engine.

Citroën India revealed the C3 in September 2021 ahead of its India launch in the first half of 2022. The C3 was the first of three models under Citroën's C-cubed program, and was specifically developed for emerging markets like India and South America. The C3 is locally manufactured in India with more than 90 percent localisation.

In February 2023, Citroën India launched an electric variant of C3 under the name Ë-C3. The car was launched about 6 months after the C3's launch. Its stated range is 320 kilometres (200 mi) per charge.

=== Current models ===
==== ICE Vehicles ====
Model	Indian introduction	Current model		Notes
Model	Indian introduction	Introduction (model code)	Update (facelift)	Notes
Hatchback
C3	2022	2022	–	
SUV/crossover
Basalt	2024	2024	–	
C3 Aircross	2023	2023	–	
C5 Aircross	2021	2021	2022	

==== Electric Vehicles ====
Model	Indian introduction	Current model		Notes
Model	Indian introduction	Introduction (model code)	Update (facelift)	Notes
Hatchback
ë-C3	2023	2023	–	
