= Birlasoft =

Indian multinational technology company

- Company type: Public
- Traded as: BSE: 532400; NSE: BSOFT
- ISIN: ISIN: INE836A01035
- Industry: Information technology
- Founded: 1990; 35 years ago
- Headquarters: Pune, India
- Area served: Worldwide
- Key people: Amita Birla (Chairman); C. K. Birla (Non-executive Director); Angan Guha (CEO & MD)
- Revenue: ▲₹5,278.1 crore (FY24)
- Net income: ▲₹623.76 crore (FY24)
- Number of employees: 12,595 (2024)
- Parent: CKA Birla Group
- Website: www.birlasoft.com

Birlasoft is an Indian multinational information technology services and consulting company, founded in 1990 and headquartered in Pune, India. It is a part of the CKA Birla Group.

Birlasoft has a presence in the United States, United Kingdom, Europe, and the Asia-Pacific region and delivery centers in India.

The company's shares are listed on the Bombay Stock Exchange and the National Stock Exchange of India. As of April 2024, Birlasoft's market capitalization was approximately ₹20,000 crore.

== History ==
Birlasoft was founded in 1990. The company was launched in New Jersey in 1992 with initial equity investment from GE Capital. By the fiscal year 2002-2003, the company reported $73 million in revenue and 1,500 employees. In 2003, GE Capital held a 20% equity stake in the company. In 2001, Birlasoft secured a contract from the Ministry of External Affairs of India to computerize Indian consulates in New York and Dubai, with an extension to 38 other consulates worldwide.

In April 2004, the company achieved a Level 5 maturity in CMMI Continuous Representation - SW version 1.1 from the Software Engineering Institute, becoming the first Indian IT company to attain this level.

In December 2005, Birlasoft acquired Portfolio Insight, a loan pricing and portfolio management software, from Sydney-based Fusion Technology Group. The company launched Birlasoft Advisior+ in the Asia-Pacific market in 2006, providing tools for investment advisors and financial institutions for portfolio management and analytics.

In January 2014, Birlasoft acquired US-based CRM software provider EnablePath for an undisclosed sum.

In 2019, Birlasoft and KPIT Technologies underwent a merger and demerger, leading to the creation of two publicly traded companies, with Birlasoft operating in business IT services and KPIT Technologies focusing on automotive embedded software.

In December 2020, Acacia II Partners LP sold over 6.7 million shares of Birlasoft Ltd worth approximately ₹137 crore through an open market transaction.

== See also ==
- List of IT consulting firms
- List of Indian IT companies
