= Hindustan Motors factory, Uttarpara =

Former automotive factory

Hindustan Motors, Uttarpara
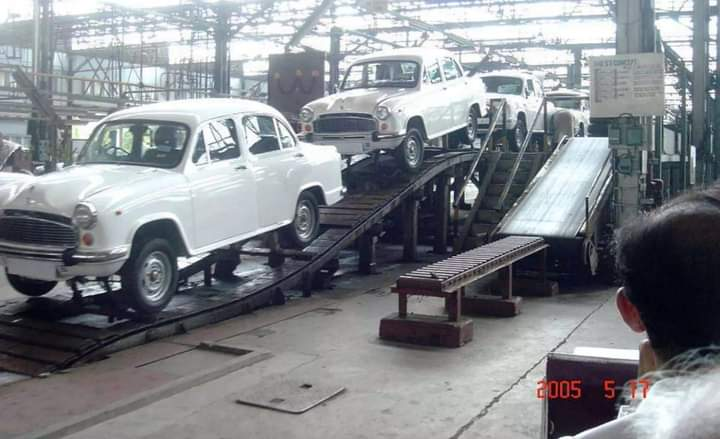
- Production of cars, 2005
- Built: 1942
- Operated: 1957
- Location: Hindmotor, Uttarpara, West Bengal
- Industry: Automotive
- Products: Hindustan Ambassador
- Employees: 22,000
- Area: 795 acres (322 ha) (Note: Also cited as 720 acres (290 ha))
- Volume: 395 acres (160 ha)
- Owner: Hindustan Motors
- Website: http://www.hindmotor.com/uttarpara.asp
- Defunct: May 24, 2014

Hindustan Motors factory, Uttarpara (Also known as Hindustan Motors factory and Hindmotor factory) was an automotive manufacturing factory in Hindmotor, a neighborhood of Uttarpara, in Hooghly district of West Bengal. It was known for being the largest producer of Hindustan Ambassadors of Hindustan Motors company in India and the first car manufacturer in India. The factory was built in 1942, becoming the second oldest automotive factory in Asia. Starting its operations in 1957, after being built in 1942, the Hindustan Motors' Ambassador declined in sales, closing the Uttarpara unit on May 24, 2014; from when the land owned by Motors was under turbulence from the inhabitants of Hindmotor and state government.

== Production of cars ==
Hindustan Motors established a factory in Hindmotor for the production of its then-new Ambassador cars. Different Ambassador variants were produced, including 1500cc and 1800cc diesel and 1800cc petrol, CNG and LPG. Others were Winner cars and auto compartments. It was the first and only integrated automotive factory in India. After the Hindmotor unit started operations, a railway station named after the unit was established, Hindmotor flag railway station. The large number of people working in the factory and train station, schools, hospital, residential houses, clubs, apartments, worship places and sport venues were subsequently built, creating the neighborhood of Hindmotor in Hooghly. The Ambassador was modeled after the British Morris Oxford. The Ambassador was once driven by high-ranking officials, politicians and frequently used as taxis, some taxis still persist.

== Decline ==
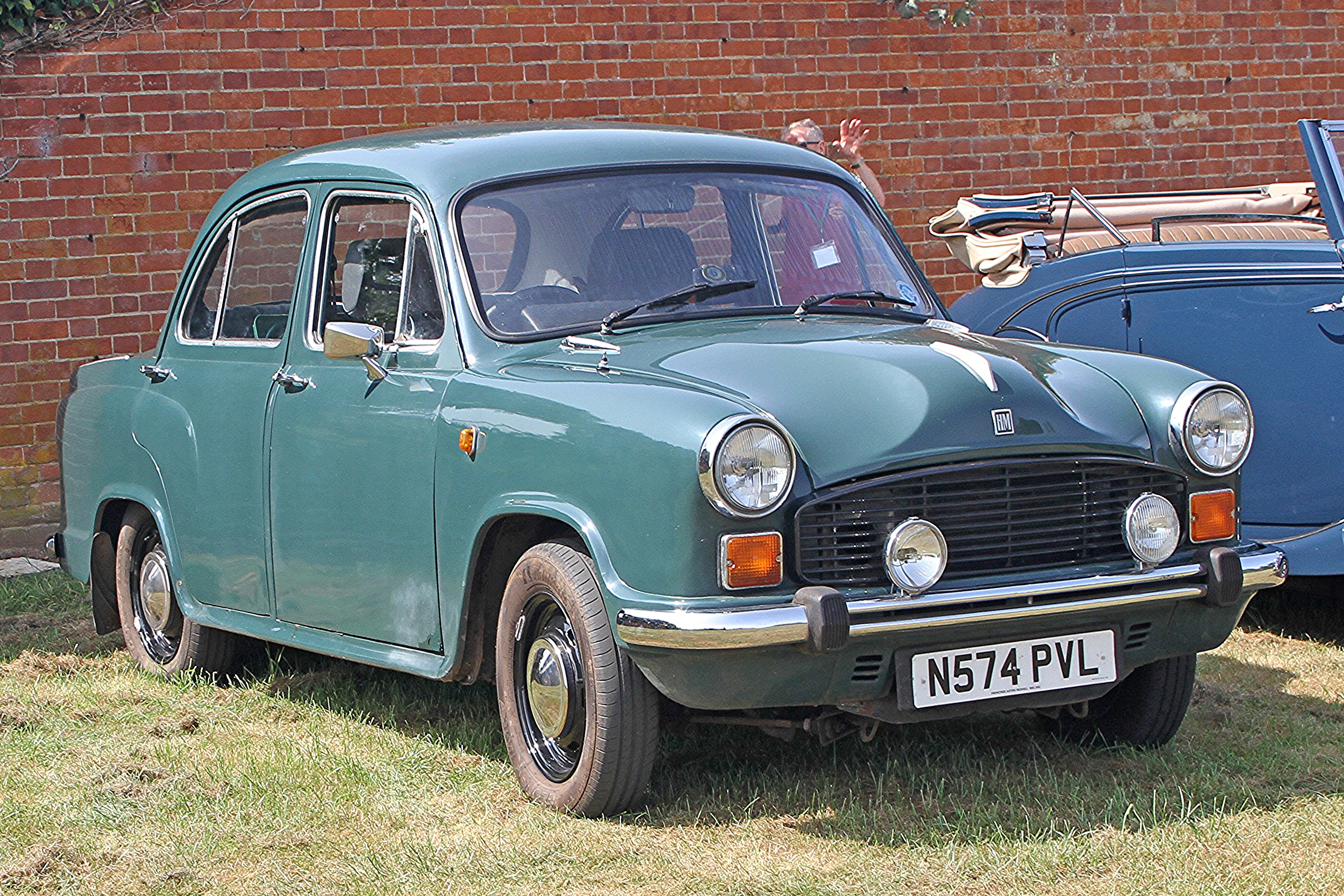
Ambassador

The Ambassador was the first car made in India and dominated the market from the 1950s to the mid-1980s. It first lost its dominance to the 800 hatchback by Maruti Suzuki which costed lesser. It suffered a major decline from the mid-1990s when global automotive manufacturers began setting up plants and selling their international cars in India. In a fiscal year conducted by the company, it sold 2,200 cars ending in March 2014 compared to 1,800,000 cars in previous years. A new ambassador cost US$8,800 in Kolkata. The number of employees decreased in the factory from 22,000 to 2,300.

Hindustan Motors sent a suspension of work notice to various Indian states with Ambassador car industries about the lack of discipline, shortage of funds, low productivity, large number of liabilities and litigations, low sales and lack of demand for the Ambassador car caused a decline in the Hindmotor factory, from when the production of cars declined in the unit.

Hindustan Motors was looking for investors for managing finances and management following COVID-19, further slowing car sales. Motors started closing its units to slow the expenses. The company started its Uttarpara unit with 795 acres (322 hectares) of land, selling 314 acres (127 hectares) to Shriram Properties in 2007 for ₹285 crore, and another 100 acres to the Hiranandani Group of Mumbai in 2020/2021. Motors was left with more than 200 acres of unused land, and another 100 acres was used by the factory.

== Closure ==
In the morning of May 24, 2014, Hindustan Motors company put a sign in front of the main gates about the stoppage of production and work in the Uttarpara plant. The official suspension of work was stated by Hindustan Motors to help in reducing liabilities and reorganizing the finances and funds, to eventually restart operations in the plant. On December 1, 2014, Motors announced a voluntary retirement scheme for all permanent grade scale staff and technicians and again on October 1, 2015. In November 2015, the Board of Directors of Motors held a meeting to approve that sale of the land of Uttarpara unit was allowed without permission or objections to the Government of West Bengal and permitted buyers of a maximum of 50 acres. Hindustan Motors closed the production of all factories outside the premises of Kolkata.

A senior official of the company remarked, "Work has been suspended indefinitely at the Uttarpara factory. It is being done to ensure the company doesn't bleed more (money) and to enable us to draw plans for its revival."

== Aftermath ==
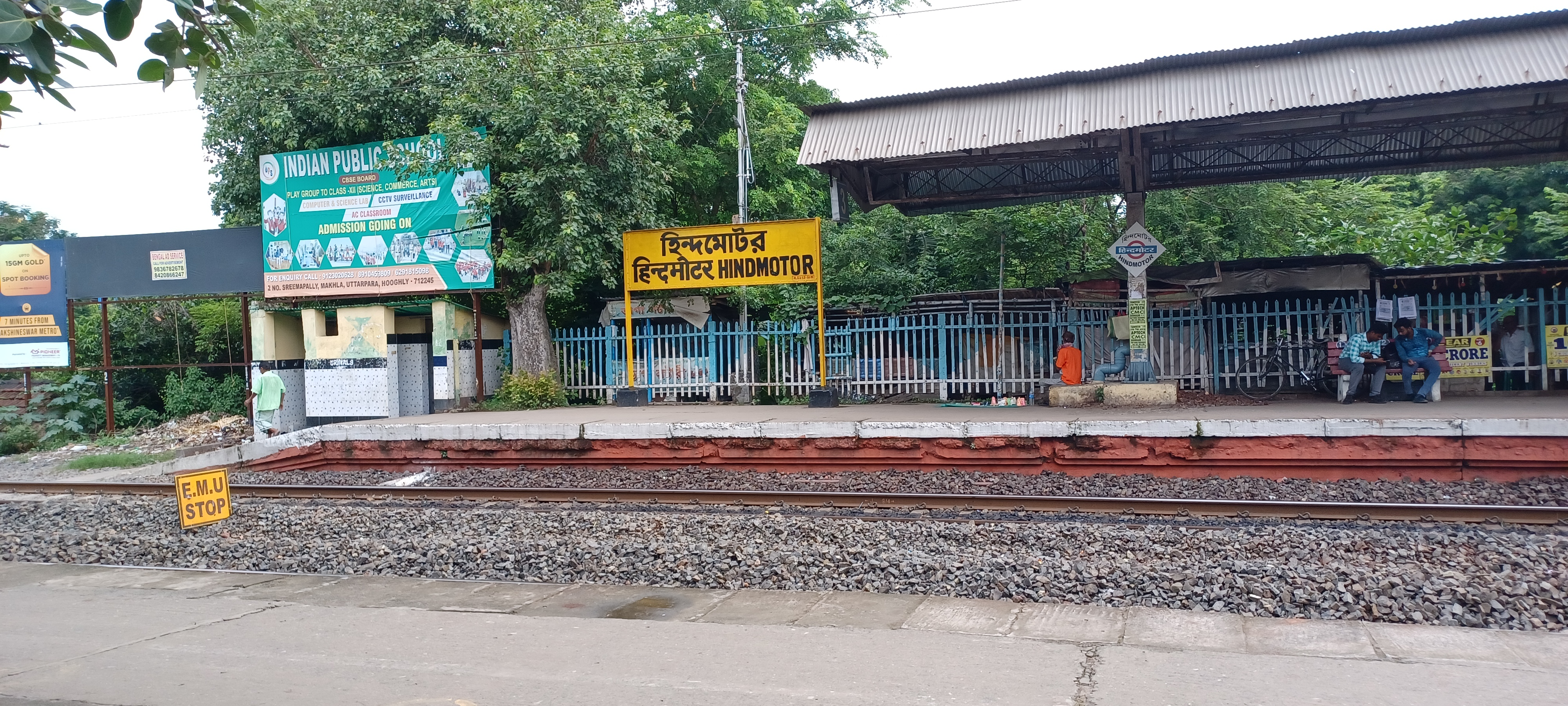
Hindmotor rail station

The tallest buildings of the factory were destroyed and replaced by new buildings on land acquired through legal means. The machinery was stolen, leaving the factory insufficient for car production. The colony encircling the factory had its water and electricity cut off and the school in it, built in 1953, was closed. Many employees of the factory inhabiting this colony with their families left the area. As of September 17, 2023, seventy families still lived in this area without water, electricity or jobs. It was asserted that when the suspension notice was put, the company had not paid the salary of the employees for six months. The colony inhabitants went to the Legislative Assembly and the Calcutta High Court, which ordered the company to pay dearness allowance to workers in 2022. In September 2015, a senior officer said that the management tried to revive the factory. But the sale of Ambassadors was not a viable option and no other company wanted to partner with them. The company announced a second voluntary retirement scheme for 1,300 workers, which offered ₹100,000 as a lump sum.

=== State meeting ===
Samrat Chakraborty, sub-divisional magistrate of Serampore, called a meeting with leaders of various labor organizations like Centre of Indian Trade Unions and factory workers for discussion about the vacant land of the Uttarpara factory of Hindustan Motors. A conclusion was reached by the labor organizations that industries should be set up on the land and the unpaid workers should be given their due salaries. Devi Prasad Basu Roy, from the Hindmotor Workers Union said at least 300 workers were not given their salaries and the company should issue funds. Pankaj Roy, from Serampore's Organizing Committee recommended the uplift of the unlawful factory suspension and to provide food, water and electricity to those living in the Hindmotor colony.

=== Reclamation of land ===
Mamata Banerjee, Chief Minister of West Bengal pointed that 700 acres of land owned by Motors were unoccupied and could be potentially used. She would discuss about the recovery of the land with Serampore Member of Parliament Kalyan Bandyopadhyay and the Chief Secretary of the land department. After parts of land were sold to different companies by motors, nearly 395 acres of land were left. Banerjee specified Hooghly as having many industrial belts, with a lot of them being shut down and their lands unoccupied.

Hindustan Motors said that around 11 p.m. on July 11, 2025, government officials, police officers and land department officials entered the Uttarpara factory and seized documents, machinery, licensed weapons, and storehouses. They submitted a special leave petition to the Supreme Court of India and sent an email and letter to the Special secretary of land department ministry and land reforms department ministry on July 11 and on July 14. The court order was scheduled for July 22.

In mid June 2025, Government of West Bengal took possession of the abandoned land used by the factory for providing other job opportunities. Titagarh Rail Systems was assigned 40 acres of the land to set up a train car shed for the manufacture and repair of Vande Bharat and other superfast trains, as part of a program to bring new trains to commercially important stations. A small rail track for testing was to be built. Titagarh was to spend approximately 200 crore in the unit spanning Uttarpara and Hindmotor.

== Lawsuits and litigations ==
In mid July 2025, a special leave petition issued by Hindustan Motors was dismissed in the Supreme Court of India retaining the order by the Calcutta High Court to pay dearness allowance to the former workers of the factory and the reclamation of land; the reclamation was issued on July 6, 2022, from when the government started claiming unused and abandoned lands. The whole 395 acres occupied by the factory was ratified by the state on November 9, 2022.
