= Birla Mandir, Jaipur =

Birla Mandir Hindu temple located in Jaipur, India

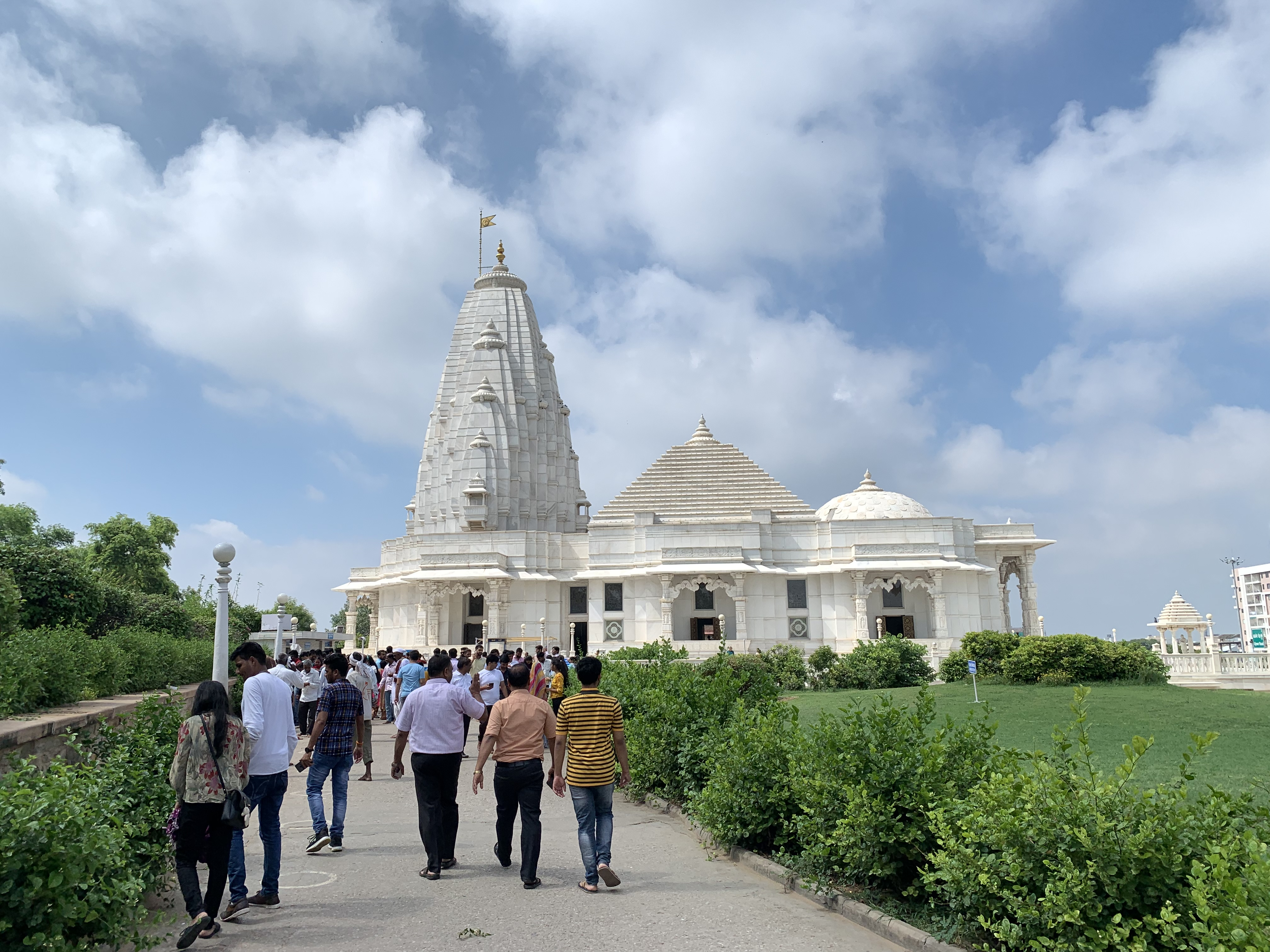

- Location within Jaipur Location within Rajasthan

Religion
- Affiliation: Hinduism
- Deity: Narayan, Lakshmi
- Festivals: Diwali, Janamashtami

Location
- Location: Birla Mandir, Jawahar Lal Nehru Marg, Tilak Nagar, Jaipur, Rajasthan 302022, India
- State: Rajasthan
- Country: India
- Coordinates: 26.8921°N 75.8155°E

Architecture
- Style: Modern
- Funded by: B. M. Birla Foundation
- Groundbreaking: 1977
- Completed: 1988
- Materials: White marble

Birla Mandir (Lakshmi Narayan Temple) is a Hindu temple located in Jaipur, India, and is one of many Birla mandirs. It was built by the B.M. Birla Foundation in 1988 and is constructed solely of white marble. It is dedicated to the Hindu goddess Lakshmi and god Vishnu (Narayan), whose images appear inside, along with other Hindu gods and goddesses and selections from the Gita and Upanishads. It is located in Jaipur's Tilak Nagar neighborhood, near Moti Dungari hill.

== History ==
Tradition states that a Maharaja sold the Birla family the land for the temple for one rupee. Construction began in 1977 under the direction Ramanauj Das and Ghanshyam Birla. It opened on February 22, 1988.

== Architecture ==
The temple is made of white marble. There are four distinct parts of the temple: its sanctum, tower, main hall, and entrance. It has three towers, referencing the three main faiths of India, as well as stained glass windows depicting traditional Hindu stories. Marble sculptures also reference Hindu mythology. It features Hindu deities inside - particularly Lakshmi, Narayan, and Ganesh - and figures such as Christ, the Virgin Mary, St. Peter, Buddha, Confucius, and Socrates on the outer walls. Statues of its founders - Rukmani Devi Birla and Braj Mohan Birla - lie outdoors in covered pavilions, facing the temple with hands folded in namaskāra mudra. Its architectural style is considered to be modern. It was built on a raised platform, which lifts it up into the Jaipur skyline; at night, it becomes covered in light. In addition to the temple itself, the grounds include gardens and a small gift shop. Below the temple lies the B. M. Birla Family Museum and the Sri and Smt. G. P. Birla Gallery; both contain photographs of the temple's construction and the Birla family's philanthropic contributions, as well as treasures belonging to the Birla family.

== Gallery ==
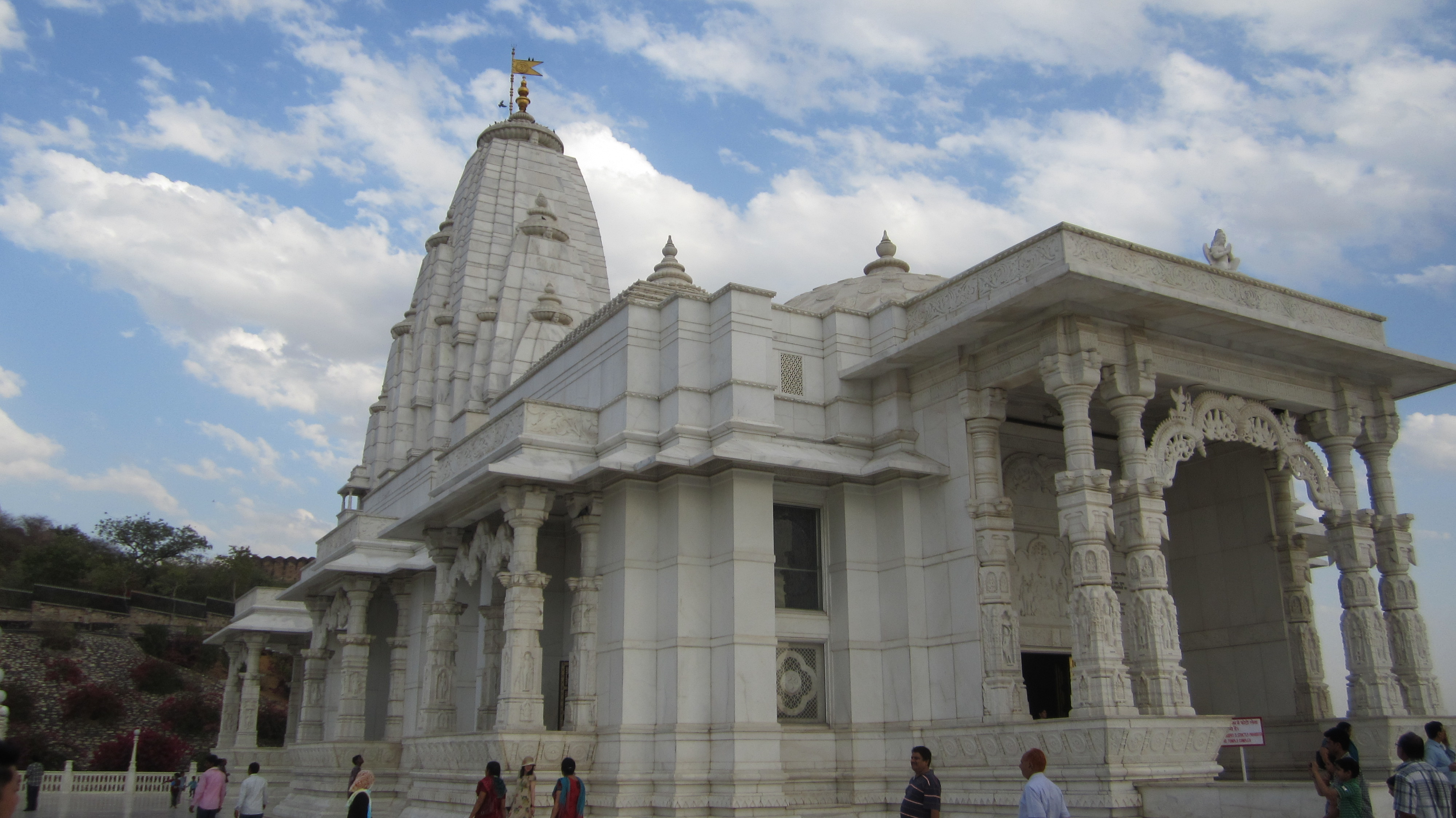

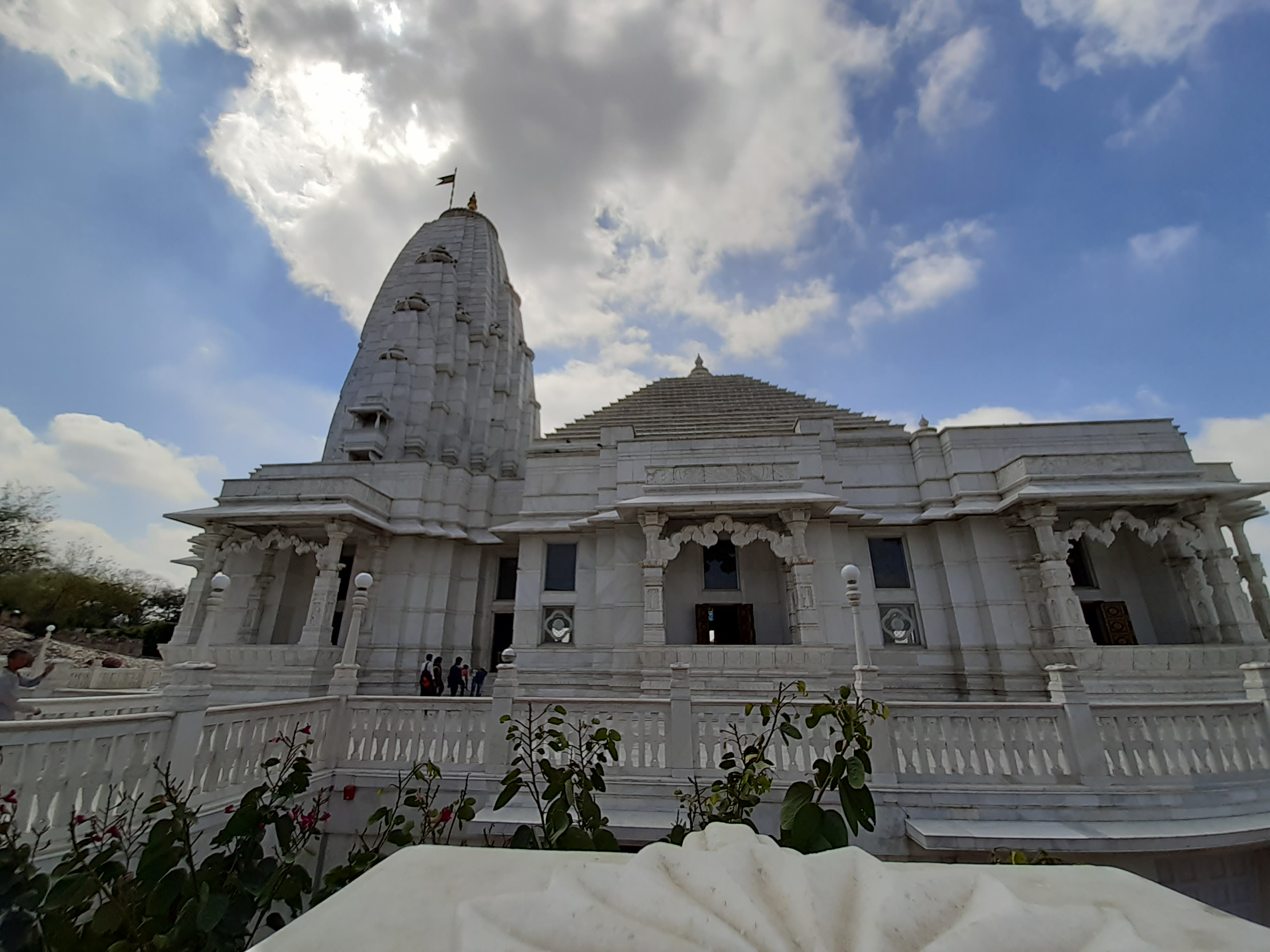

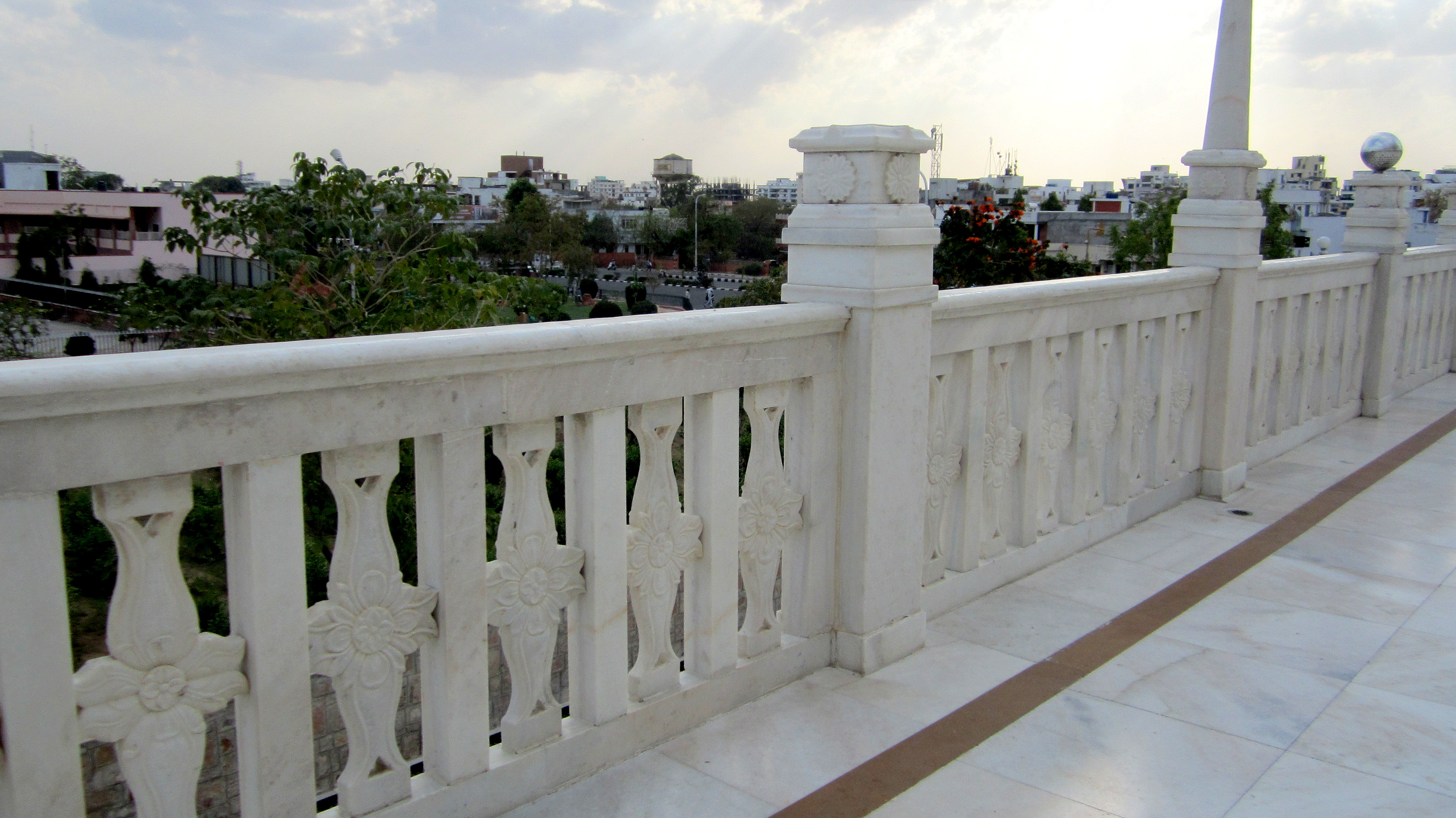

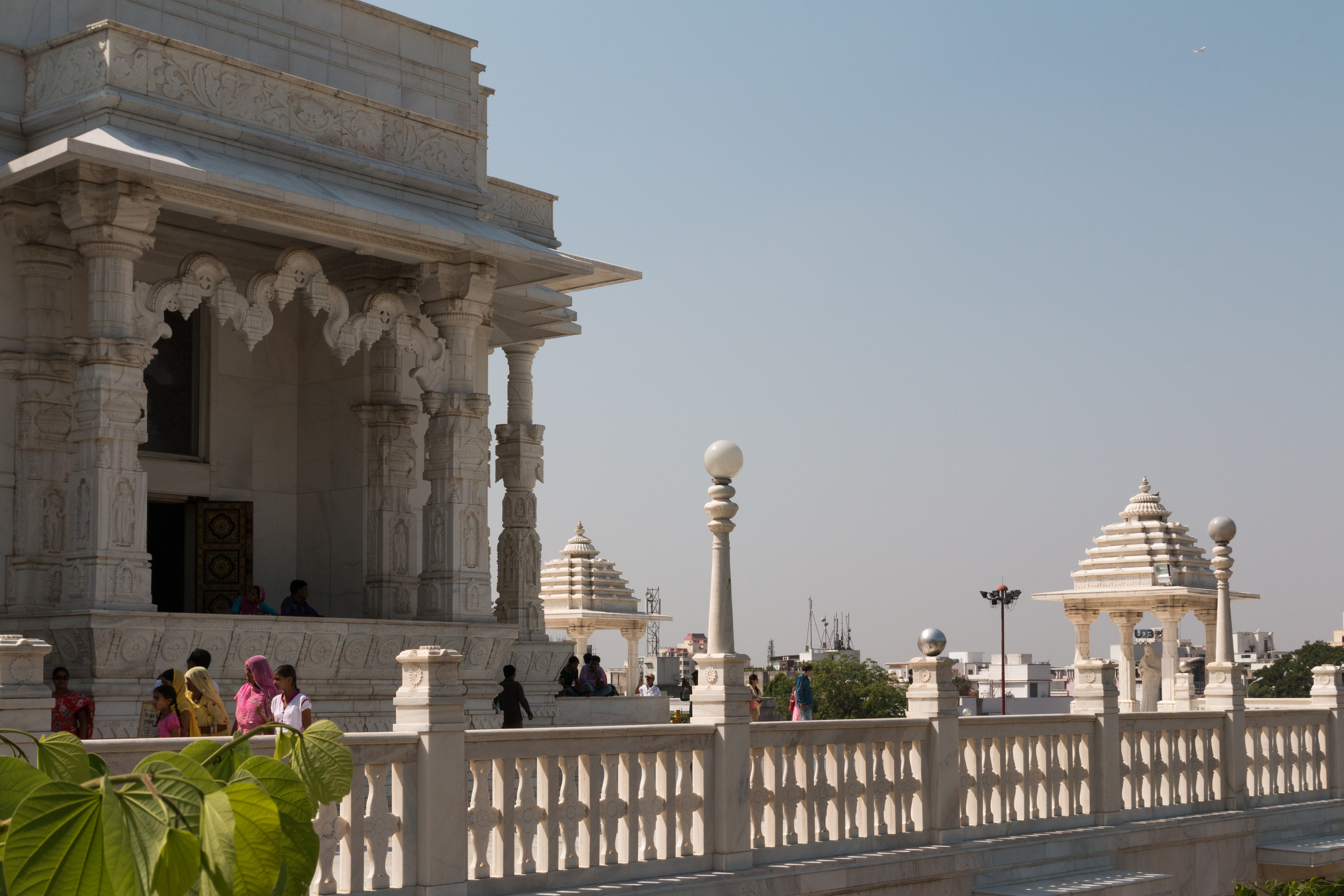

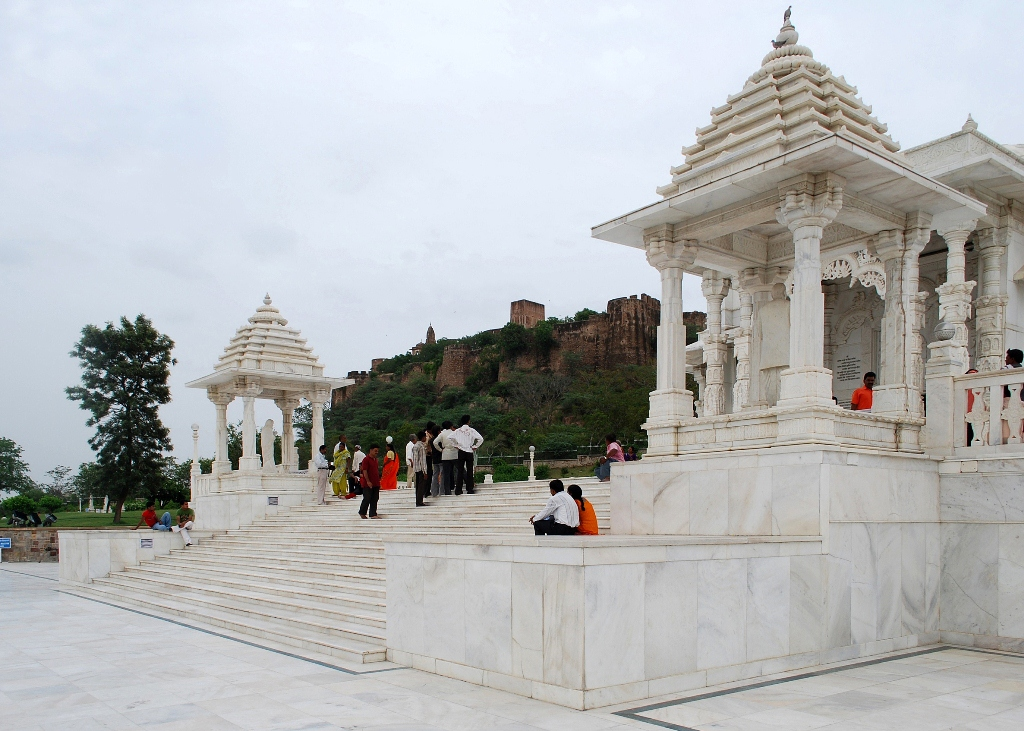
