= Orient Electric =

Indian multinational electronics company

- Company type: Public
- Traded as: BSE: 541301; NSE: ORIENTELEC
- ISIN: INE142Z01019
- Industry: Electrical equipment; Home Appliances
- Founded: 1954; 72 years ago
- Founder: C. K. Birla
- Headquarters: New Delhi, India
- Area served: Worldwide
- Key people: Ravindra Singh Negi (CEO & Managing Director)
- Products: Home appliances; Fans; Lighting; Switchgear
- Number of employees: 1,000
- Parent: CKA Birla Group
- Website: orientelectric.com

Orient Electric Limited is an Indian electrical equipment manufacturer, based in New Delhi and part of CKA Birla Group. It makes fans, lighting, home appliances and switchgears. Orient Electric has manufacturing facilities in Kolkata, Faridabad, Hyderabad and Noida.

Orient Electric was a division of Orient Paper & Industries, until its demerger in 2018.

== History ==
On 14 July 2023, Orient Electric announced the resignation of Managing Director and CEO Rajan Gupta. On 15 July 2023, Desh Deepak Khetrapal was appointed as the new Managing Director.

On 31 May 2024, Orient Electric appointed Ravindra Singh Negi as its Managing Director and CEO, succeeding Deepak Khetrapal.
