= Indira Gandhi Chowk =

Indira Gandhi Chawk
- Narayan Bapu Nagar (Borough) Chawk
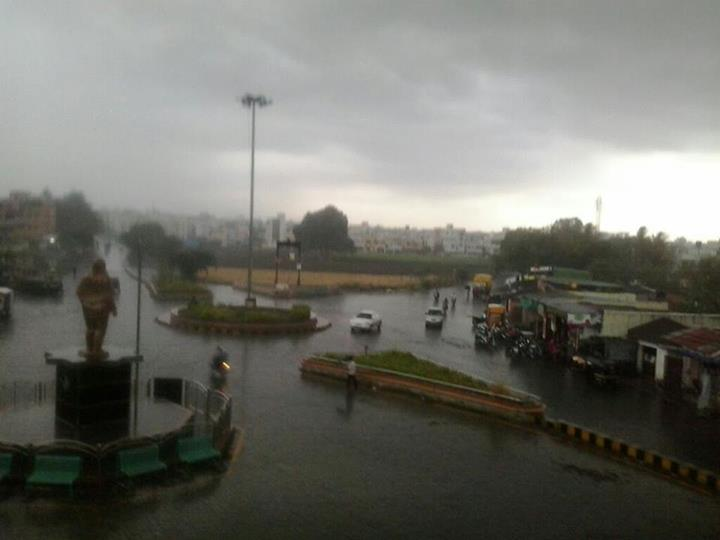
- Interactive map of Indira Gandhi Chawk

Location
- Nashik, India
- Coordinates: 20.00°N 73.78°E
- Roads at junction: Shivaji Nagar, Upnagar, Old Saikheda(Sailani), Taakli all connects to Jail Road and Nashik-Pune NH50

Construction
- Type: Intersection
- Opened: 2003

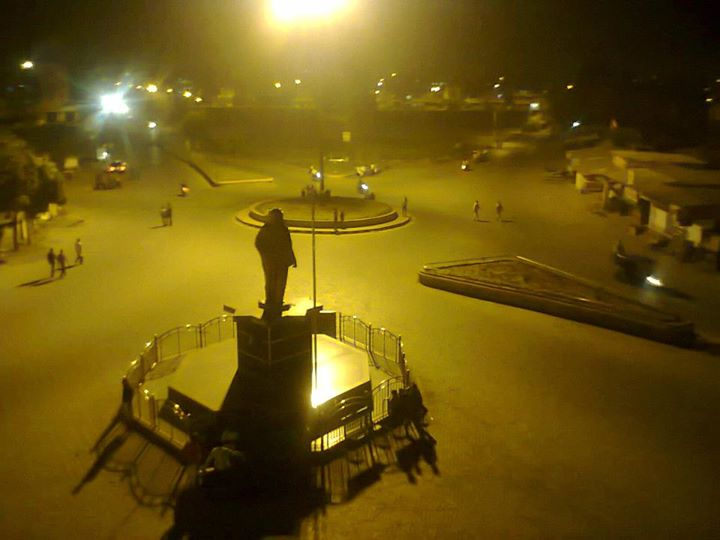
Indira Gandhi Statue at midnight 3am

Indira Gandhi Chawk or Narayan Bapu Nagar Chawk is a road junction and public space of Nashik's Nashik Road, built in 2003 to connect Jail Road (SH26) with the major shopping area Nashik Road. Indira Gandhi was the first female Prime Minister of Republic of India, This circle was open to public in 2003 with the help of Vilasrao Deshmukh, Chief Minister of Maharashtra.

The Indira Gandhi Statue now links directly to the theatres on Nashik-Pune Road National Highway 50, as well as shopping malls, and highwaysin Nashik city. The Circle is close to major shopping and entertainment areas in the West End. Its status as a major traffic intersection has made Indira Gandhi Chawk a busy meeting place and a tourist attraction in its own right.

== Notable people ==
- Dinkar Gotiram Adhav
- Karbhari Adhav
- Frank Pinto
- Nishant Gatkal
- Aakash Adhav
- Sampat Kachru Kadam
- Dr. Devendra Yeole
- Manish Yerawar
- Deepesh Joshi
- Niraj Kulkarni
