= Hindmotor =

Neighbourhood in Hooghly, West Bengal, India

- Neighbourhood
- Location in West Bengal, India Hindmotor (India)
- Coordinates: 22.69°N 88.33°E
- Country: India
- State: West Bengal
- Division: Burdwan
- District: Hooghly

Government
  - Type: Municipality
  - Body: Uttarpara Kotrung Municipality

Languages
  - Official: Bengali, English, Hindi
- Time zone: UTC+5:30 (IST)
- PIN: 712233
- Telephone code: +91 33
- Vehicle registration: WB
- Lok Sabha constituency: Sreerampur
- Vidhan Sabha constituency: Uttarpara

Hindmotor is a neighbourhood in Uttarpara of Hooghly district in the Indian state of West Bengal. It is a part of the area covered by Kolkata Metropolitan Development Authority (KMDA).

The town is prominent as it developed and named, for a Hindustan Motors factory, shared with the neighbouring Uttarpara and Konnagar suburbs. The factory had been in the area, known as Hindmotor colony since 1948 and was the sole manufacturing site of the famous Hindustan Ambassador. At its peak the Hindmotor colony had its own schools, temples and hospitals. Apart from Hindmotor colony, Hindmotor town is located on both sides of the Hindmotor Railway station well connected with railway as well as G.T Road.

== Transport ==
Hind Motor is well connected by road and rail. State Highway 6 / Grand Trunk Road passes through the locality.

=== Bus ===
Few private buses connect Hind Motor to Kolkata.

=== Train ===
Hind Motor railway station connects the town to Howrah Station via the Howrah-Bardhaman main line.
