= Rajasthan Foundation =

- Formation: March 30, 2001; 23 years ago
- Legal status: Government Organisation
- Purpose: To address the unique needs and concerns of people of Rajasthani origin living outside Rajasthan, in other states within India
- Headquarters: Rajasthan Foundation, Yojana Bhawan, Yudhishther Marg, C-Scheme, Jaipur, India
- Owner: Government of Rajasthan
- Chairperson: Dheeraj Srivastava
- Key people: Bhajan Lal Sharma (Chairman & Chief Minister of Rajasthan)
- Affiliations: Industries Department, Government of Rajasthan
- Website: foundation.rajasthan.gov.in

Rajasthan Foundation is an Indian government organization in Rajasthan, which was founded in 2001. It is registered under the Rajasthan Societies Registration Act, 1860. It is a part of the Industries Department. The main objective of the foundation is to promote the interests and concerns of Non-resident Rajasthanis (NRRs) settled in India and abroad and to strengthen relationships between the people of Rajasthan and NRRs for mutual benefit.

== History ==
The Rajasthan Foundation was established in 2001 as part of the Industries Department. Its formation was an initiative of the Rajasthan government to promote the interests of Non-resident Rajasthanis and to create a platform for continuous interaction between the state and its diaspora.

== Objectives ==
The Rajasthan Foundation has several objectives, including:

1. Strengthening and renewing the bonds between Non-Resident Rajasthanis (NRRs) settled in India and abroad and their state of origin, Rajasthan.
2. Connecting Global and Indian NRRs to their roots, culture, and heritage, and enhancing their belongingness to their homeland.
3. Providing a forum for continuous communication and interaction between NRRs, the State of Rajasthan, and its various agencies.
4. Mobilizing and integrating Rajasthani Diaspora in socio-economic development.
5. Promoting the welfare and well-being of NRRs living in different parts of the country and the world.
6. Identifying specific problems of NRRs and coordinating with the State and Government of India in times of crisis.
7. Creating mutually beneficial relationships and partnerships between the diaspora and their homeland by tapping into diaspora resources in economic, social, and cultural areas.
8. Conceiving and implementing effective schemes and conducting various programs to achieve the above goals.

== Administration ==
Rajasthan Foundation is headed by the Chief Minister of Rajasthan, who serves as its chairman. The foundation is overseen by a governing body that has general superintendence, directions, and control of its affairs. The Commissioner of the Rajasthan Foundation serves as the Member Secretary of the organization. The Member Secretary is the chief executive officer of the Foundation and is responsible for executing its functions in accordance with the broad policy and guidelines established by the Governing Body. Dheeraj Srivastava served as the current chairperson of the foundation.

== See also ==
- Rajasthani people
- Indian diaspora
