= Devapur, Vikramgad =

Village in Maharashtra

Devapur
- village
- Location in Maharashtra, India Devapur (India)
- Coordinates: 19.8758609°N 73.0361003°E
- Country: India
- State: Maharashtra
- District: Palghar
- Taluka: Vikramgad
- Elevation: 129 m (423 ft)

Population (2011)
  - Total: 864
- Time zone: UTC+5:30 (IST)
- 2011 census code: 551773

Devapur is a village in the Palghar district of Maharashtra, India. It is located in the Vikramgad taluka.

== Demographics ==
According to the 2011 census of India, Devapur has 147 households. The effective literacy rate (i.e. the literacy rate of population excluding children aged 6 and below) is 53.89%.

Demographics (2011 Census)
	Total	Male	Female
Population	864	404	460
Children aged below 6 years	170	78	92
Scheduled caste	0	0	0
Scheduled tribe	857	400	457
Literates	374	206	168
Workers (all)	481	228	253
Main workers (total)	458	224	234
Main workers: Cultivators	261	151	110
Main workers: Agricultural labourers	86	30	56
Main workers: Household industry workers	67	3	64
Main workers: Other	44	40	4
Marginal workers (total)	23	4	19
Marginal workers: Cultivators	2	0	2
Marginal workers: Agricultural labourers	18	3	15
Marginal workers: Household industry workers	1	0	1
Marginal workers: Others	2	1	1
Non-workers	383	176	207
