= Deopur, Bhopal =

Deopur
- village
- Location within Madhya Pradesh Location within India
- Coordinates: 23.4045331°N 77.3640257°E
- Country: India
- State: Madhya Pradesh
- District: Bhopal
- Tehsil: Huzur
- Elevation: 485 m (1,591 ft)

Population (2011)
  - Total: 300
- Time zone: UTC+5:30 (IST)
- ISO 3166 code: MP-IN
- 2011 census code: 482380

Deopur is a village in the Bhopal district of Madhya Pradesh, India. It is located in the Huzur tehsil and the Phanda block.

== Demographics ==
According to the 2011 census of India, Deopur has 72 households. The effective literacy rate (i.e. the literacy rate of population excluding children aged 6 and below) is 70.33%.

Demographics (2011 Census)
	Total	Male	Female
Population	300	152	148
Children aged below 6 years	54	25	29
Scheduled caste	0	0	0
Scheduled tribe	0	0	0
Literates	173	106	67
Workers (all)	167	84	83
Main workers (total)	142	80	62
Main workers: Cultivators	24	23	1
Main workers: Agricultural labourers	117	57	60
Main workers: Household industry workers	0	0	0
Main workers: Other	1	0	1
Marginal workers (total)	25	4	21
Marginal workers: Cultivators	2	0	2
Marginal workers: Agricultural labourers	22	4	18
Marginal workers: Household industry workers	0	0	0
Marginal workers: Others	1	0	1
Non-workers	133	68	65
