= Devapur, Adilabad district =

Devapur
- Census Town
- Location in Telangana, India Devapur (India)
- Coordinates: 19.0350°N 79.3592°E
- Country: India
- State: Telangana
- District: Mancherial

Area
  - Total: 22.55 km^{2} (8.71 sq mi)

Population (2011)
  - Total: 9,683
  - Density: 429.4/km^{2} (1,112/sq mi)

Languages
  - Official: Telugu, Urdu
- Time zone: UTC+5:30
- PIN: 504218
- Vehicle registration: TS–02
- Website: telangana.gov.in

Devapur, is a census town in Adilabad district of the Indian state of Telangana.
