= Hindustan Motors =

Car manufacturing company in India pvt ltd

Hindustan Motors Limited.
- Type: Public
- Traded as: NSE: HINDMOTORS; BSE: 500500
- Industry: Automotive
- Founded: 1942; 84 years ago
- Founder: Brij Mohan Birla
- Defunct: 2014
- Fate: Operation suspended
- Headquarters: Kolkata, India
- Key people: Uttam Bose (MD); Prakash Sahu (CEO)
- Products: Automotive industry; Automotive parts
- Revenue: ₹ 30 crore (US$ 3.5 million) (2024)
- Owner: S Parmar
- Divisions: Hindustan Motorcycles

Hindustan Motors was an Indian automotive manufacturer based in Kolkata. It was a part of the Birla Technical Services conglomerate. Hindustan Motors held the largest share of the Indian passenger car market until the early 1980s, when Maruti Udyog began production and significantly altered the competitive landscape. Hindustan Motors manufactured the Ambassador and Landmaster motorcars (based on 1956 Morris Oxford Series III), both immensely popular Indian automobiles from 1957 to 2014.

One of the original three car manufacturers in India, founded in 1942 by Mr. B.M. Birla, it was a leader in car sales until the 1980s, when the industry was opened up from protection. Manoj Jha was the managing director who stepped down from the post on 21 February 2012.

In early 2013, Hindustan Motors announced that it will demerger and transfer its Chennai plant to its fully owned subsidiary Hindustan Motor Finance Corporation Limited.

On 11 February 2017, Hindustan Motors executed an agreement with PSA Group (now Stellantis) for the sale of the Ambassador brand, including the trademarks, for a consideration of ₹80 crore. The tie-up entails two joint venture agreements between the companies of the two groups.

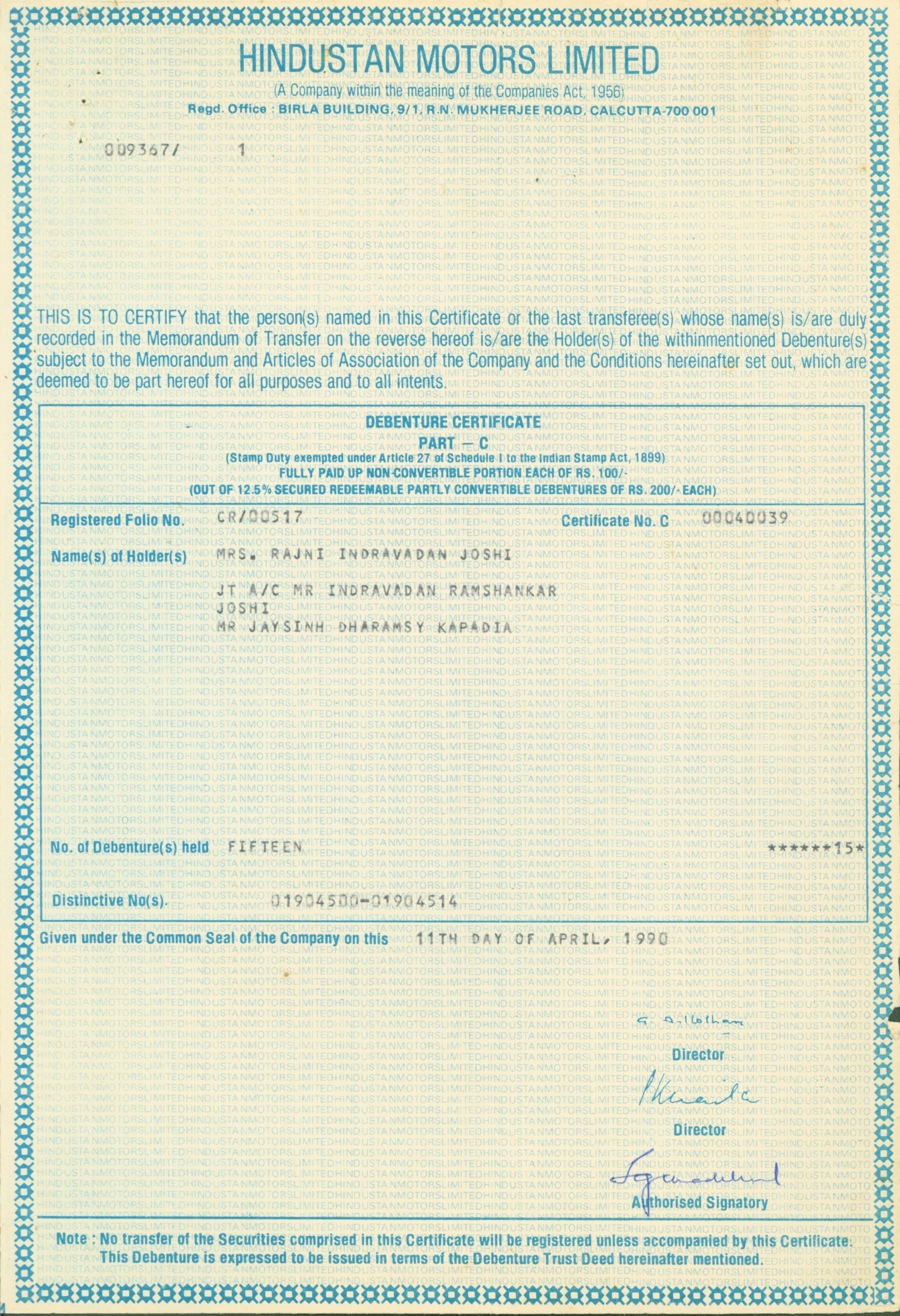
Debenture certificate of Hindustan Motors Ltd., issued 11 April 1990

== History ==
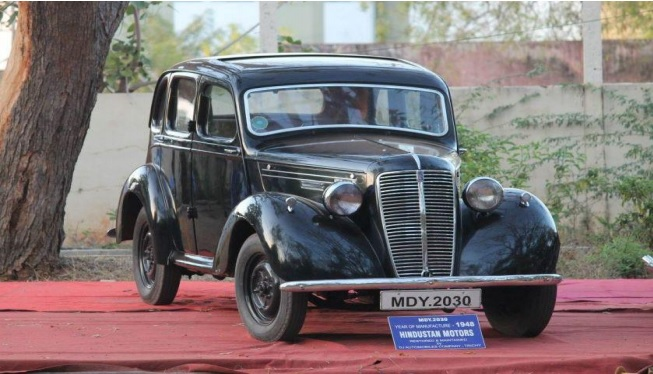
1948 Hindustan 10

Hindustan Motors Limited (HML) was India's pioneering automobile manufacturing company. It was established just before the Indian Independence Act 1947, in 1942 by B. M. Birla of the industrialist Birla family in collaboration with Lord Nuffield of Morris Motors, who were already selling their cars in India. Commencing operations in a small assembly plant in Port Okha near Gujarat, the manufacturing facilities later moved to the Hindustan Motors Uttarpara unit in Uttarpara, West Bengal in 1948, where it began the production of the Morris-designed Hindustan Ambassador. The HM-Mitsubishi Motors Plant is in Tiruvallur near Chennai in Tamil Nadu.

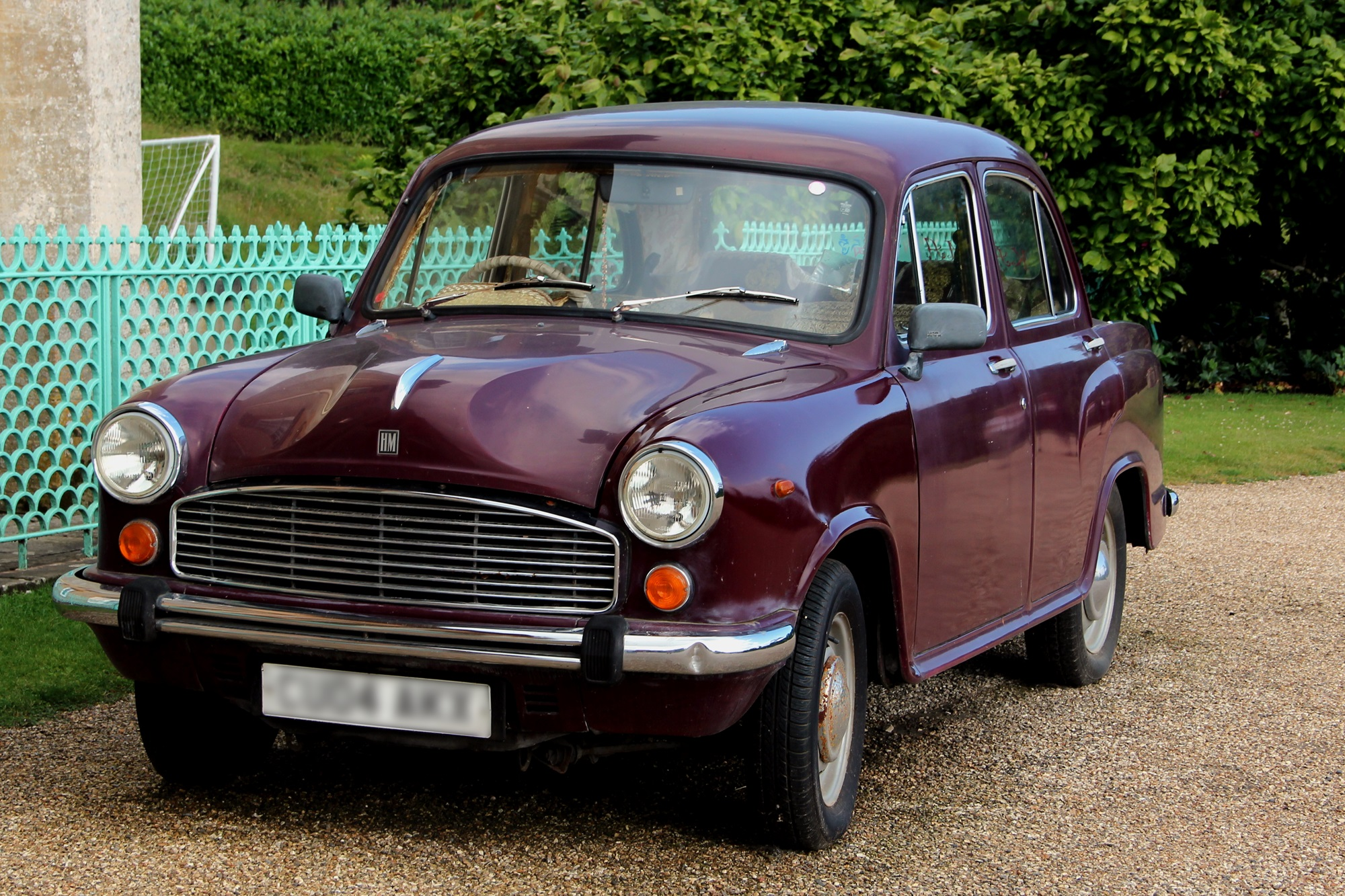
Hindustan Ambassador, later model

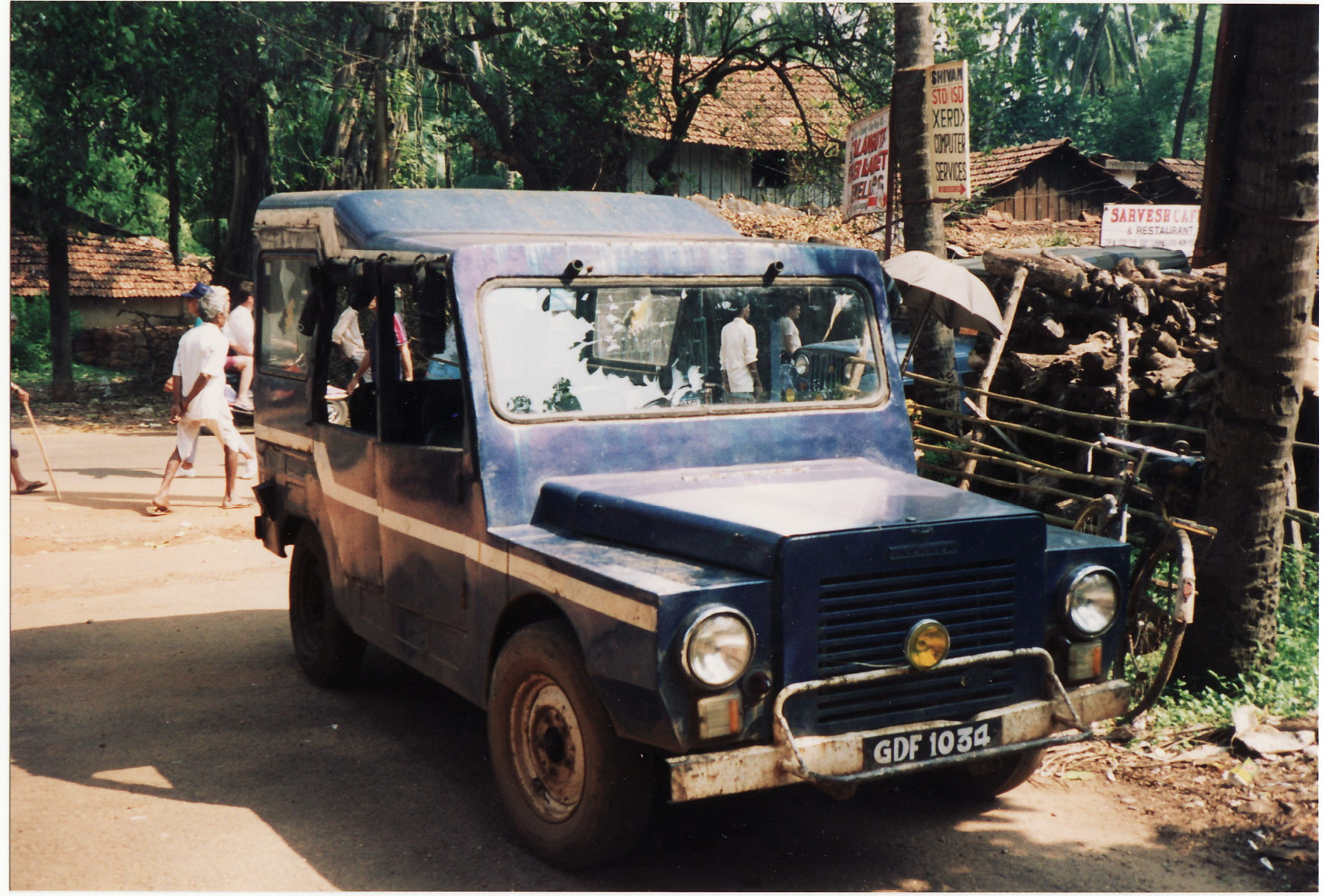
Hindustan Trekker

In 1948, after independence, vehicle production was shifted to a new greenfield plant spread over a large area in Uttarpara, West Bengal. The first car to roll out from the Uttarpara plant was the Hindustan 10, based on the Morris 10. Later the Hindustan 14, based on the Morris Oxford MO, and baby Hindustan, based on the Morris minor, were produced. In 1954 Hindustan launched the Morris Oxford Series II-derived Hindustan Landmaster, and in 1957 the Hindustan Ambassador, based on the Morris Oxford Series III, was launched. This first model, later known as Mark-1, whose basic design remained unchanged was manufactured until 2014 with various model changes on facelifts, engines and later with power steering, disc brakes, etc.

=== General Motors joint venture ===
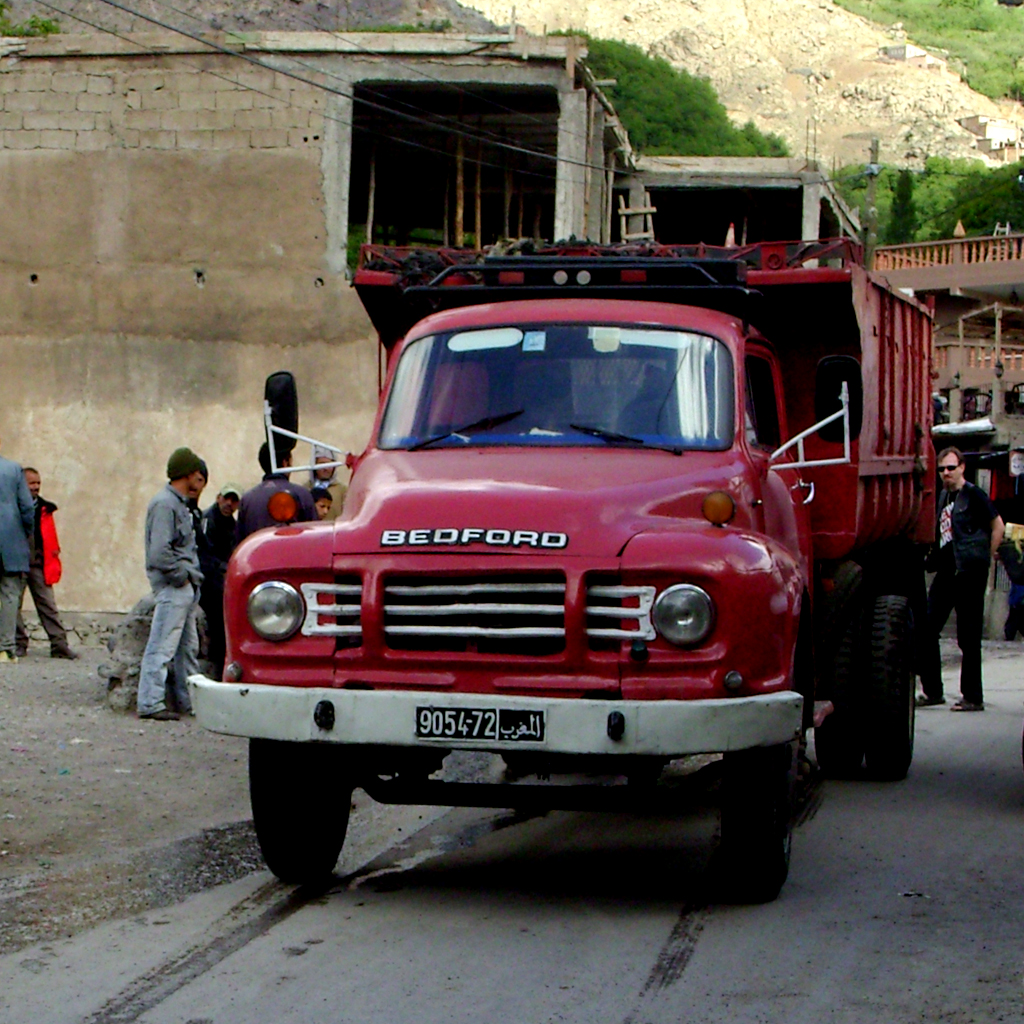
Bedford TJ manufactured by HM in India

Hindustan and General Motors have had several tie-ups in the post independence era to produce Bedford Trucks, Vauxhall Motors (1980 to 1990), Allison Transmissions and off-road equipment. In 1994, GM and Hindustan (C K Birla) formed a 50-50 joint venture, General Motors India to manufacture Opel Astra cars in the newly created mid-segment category. The production of the Astra was phased out and later replaced by the then successful Opel Corsa family of vehicles. In early 1999 General Motors India bought out the Halol, Gujarat, plant from Hindustan Motors thus ending a long partnership.

On 21 February 2012, Mr. Manoj Jha, the managing director stepped down from his post. The decision was unanimously accepted by the board of directors.

=== Earthmoving Equipment Division (HMEED) ===
Hindustan motors used to make earthmovers, initially in collaboration with Terex (US) and Fermac (UK); and beginning in 1984 with Caterpillar Inc. at the HMEED plants in Thiruvallur, near Chennai and Puducherry. The operation was sold to Caterpillar in 2000 and HM quit the earthmover business. HML continue to be a joint venture partner with Caterpillar in Hindustan Power Plus, which manufactures diesel engines and generator sets.

=== Hindustan Tractors ===
The company began in 1959 as Tractors and Bulldozers Private Ltd and imported tractors. Manufacturing of tractors began in 1963, in collaboration Motokov-Praha (Zetor) of Czechoslovakia, and was known as Hindustan Tractors & Bulldozers Ltd. In 1967, it became Hindustan Tractors Ltd. The tractors were based on the Zetor tractor design and sold under the Hindustan brand. In 1978, the Gujarat, Indian government formed Gujarat Tractors from the ailing company. In 1999, Mahindra Tractors purchased 60% of the company, and in 2001, completed purchasing the rest of the company, renaming it Mahindra Gujarat Tractors Ltd.

=== Isuzu joint venture ===
In 1982 Hindustan formed a collaboration with Isuzu to assemble and sell the Isuzu F series - JCS trucks in India. These trucks came from the factory with a fully built modern metal cabin which was not common with Tata and Ashok Leyland trucks at the time. They were well known for their reliability and fuel consumption, but were discontinued mainly due to falling sales, poor service facilities, and HML not being able to sell them for an affordable price.

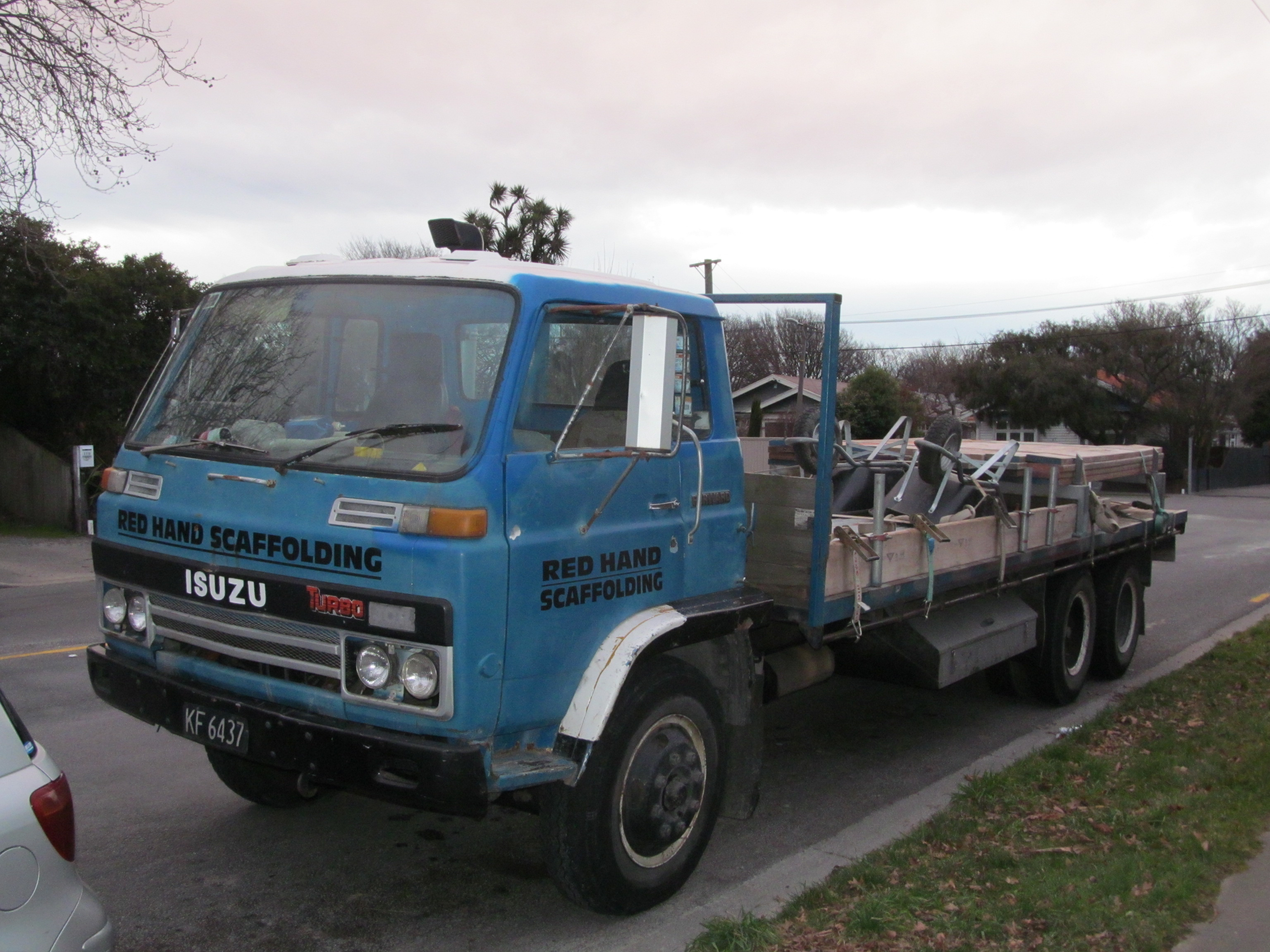
Similar looking 1982 Isuzu Forward JCR500S

Hindustan Motors also entered into a technical collaboration to manufacture engines and transmissions for the Contessa in the late 1980s at a newly constructed state of the art engine plant at Pithampur near Indore, Madhya Pradesh. The petrol engine commonly known as Isuzu 1.8 Petrol would later serve in the Hindustan Ambassador with Multi Point Fuel Injection until 2015. Initially the joint venture produced 4-cylinder G180Z 1.8L petrol engines and 5-speed transmissions. Later, an 2.0L Isuzu diesel engine was added to the production line to power the Contessa and the Ambassador. The technical collaboration lasted from 1983 to 1993. The Indore plant has since expanded to manufacture engines for a number of other manufacturers like Opel, Ford and Mahindra.

=== Mitsubishi joint venture ===
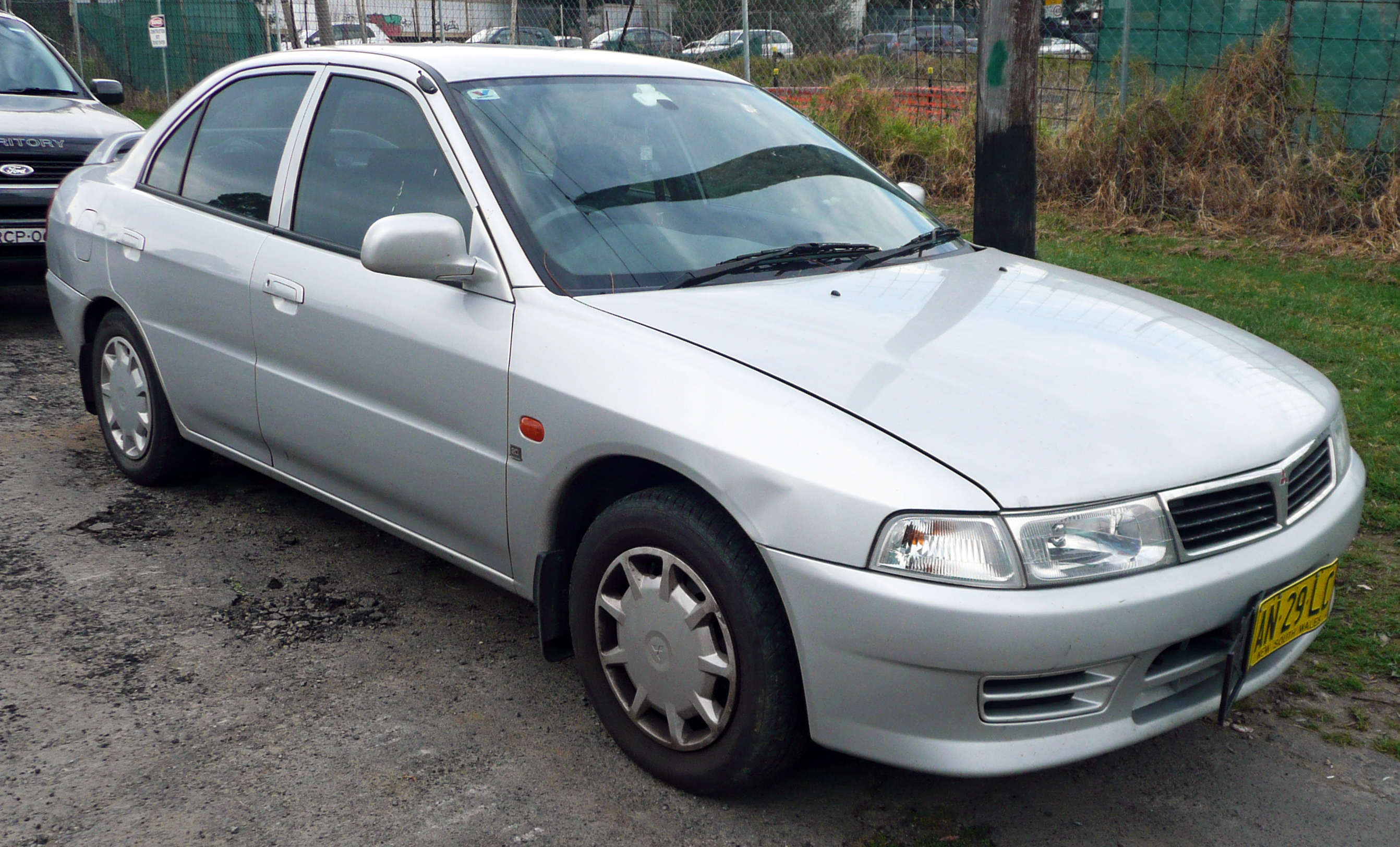
The sixth generation Mitsubishi Lancer had a long production run in India

Hindustan has a joint venture with Mitsubishi that began in 1998. The plant is located in Thiruvallur, Tamil Nadu. In India, Mitsubishi offered the Pajero, Lancer and Outlander with mild refreshes until early 2010s, but as time went by, their sales trended down. Mitsubishi launched Pajero Sport in 2012 with a 2.5l DI-D Variable Geometrical Turbo Diesel engine mated to a 5-speed AT (in 2WD only) or MT (in 4X4 only). Montero was also offered for a brief duration. Mitsubishi also launched the latest generation Outlander in 2018. The Lancer Evolution X was launched in India in 2013 as a CBU import, but it did not sell well in India due to the high price of ₹50 lakh.

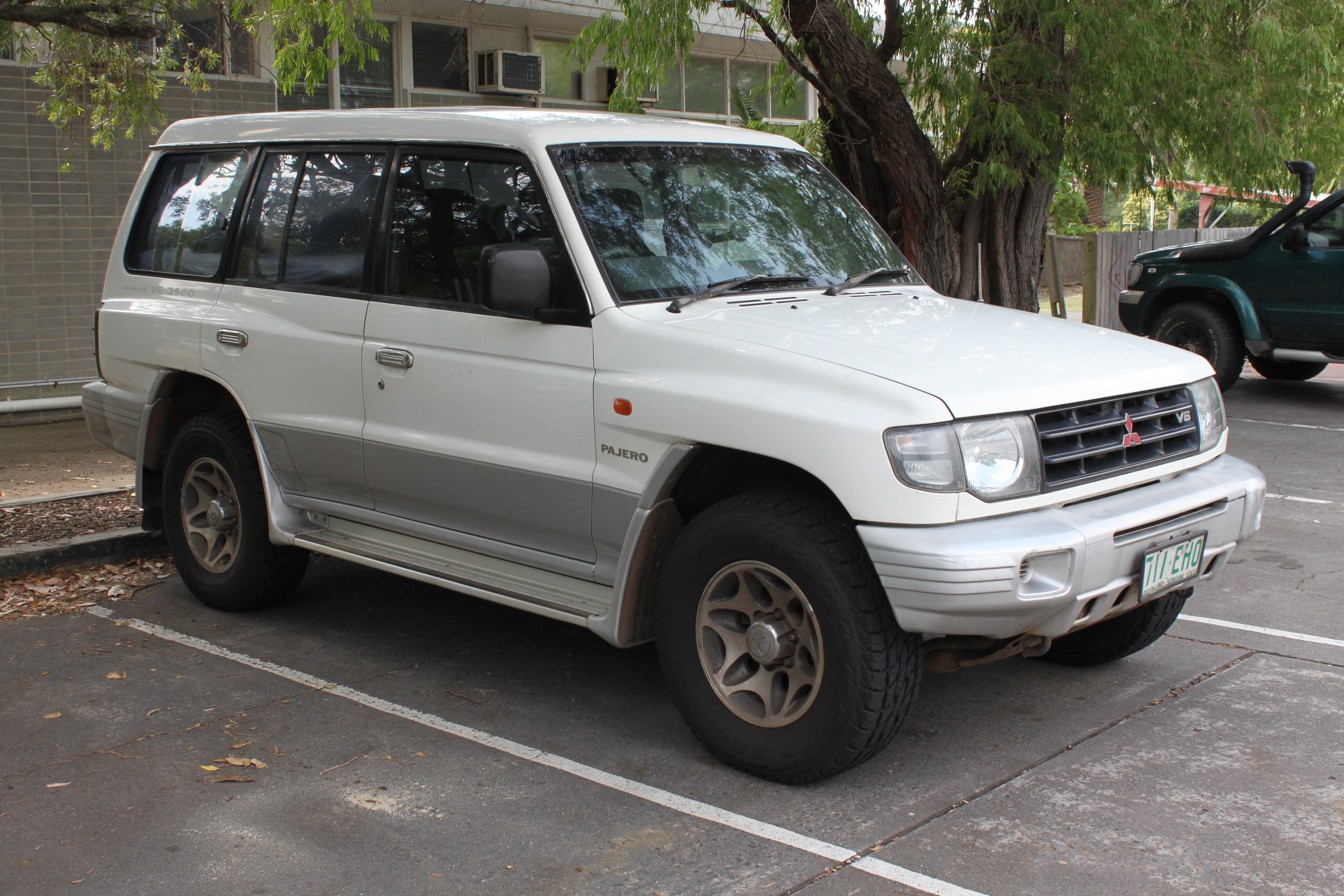
Mitsubishi Pajero

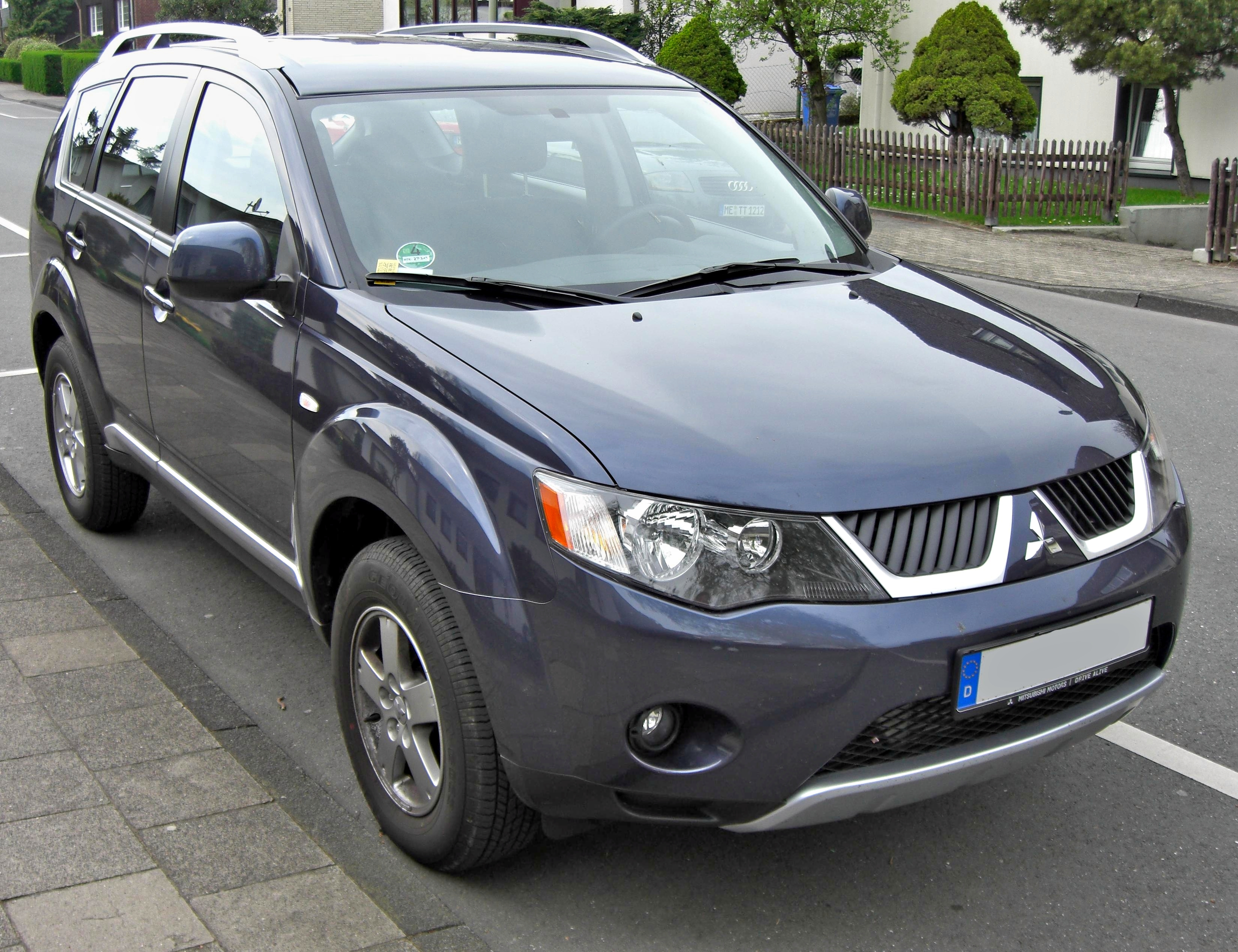
Mitsubishi Outlander

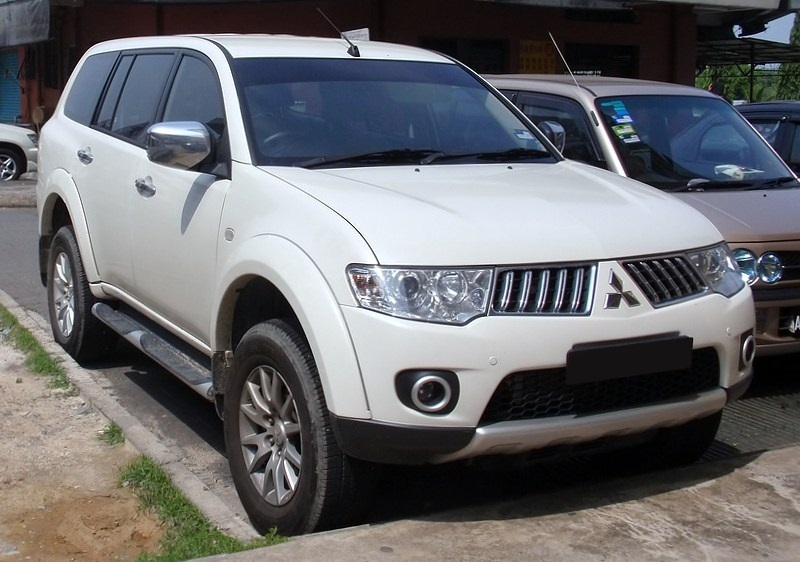
Mitsubishi Pajero Sport

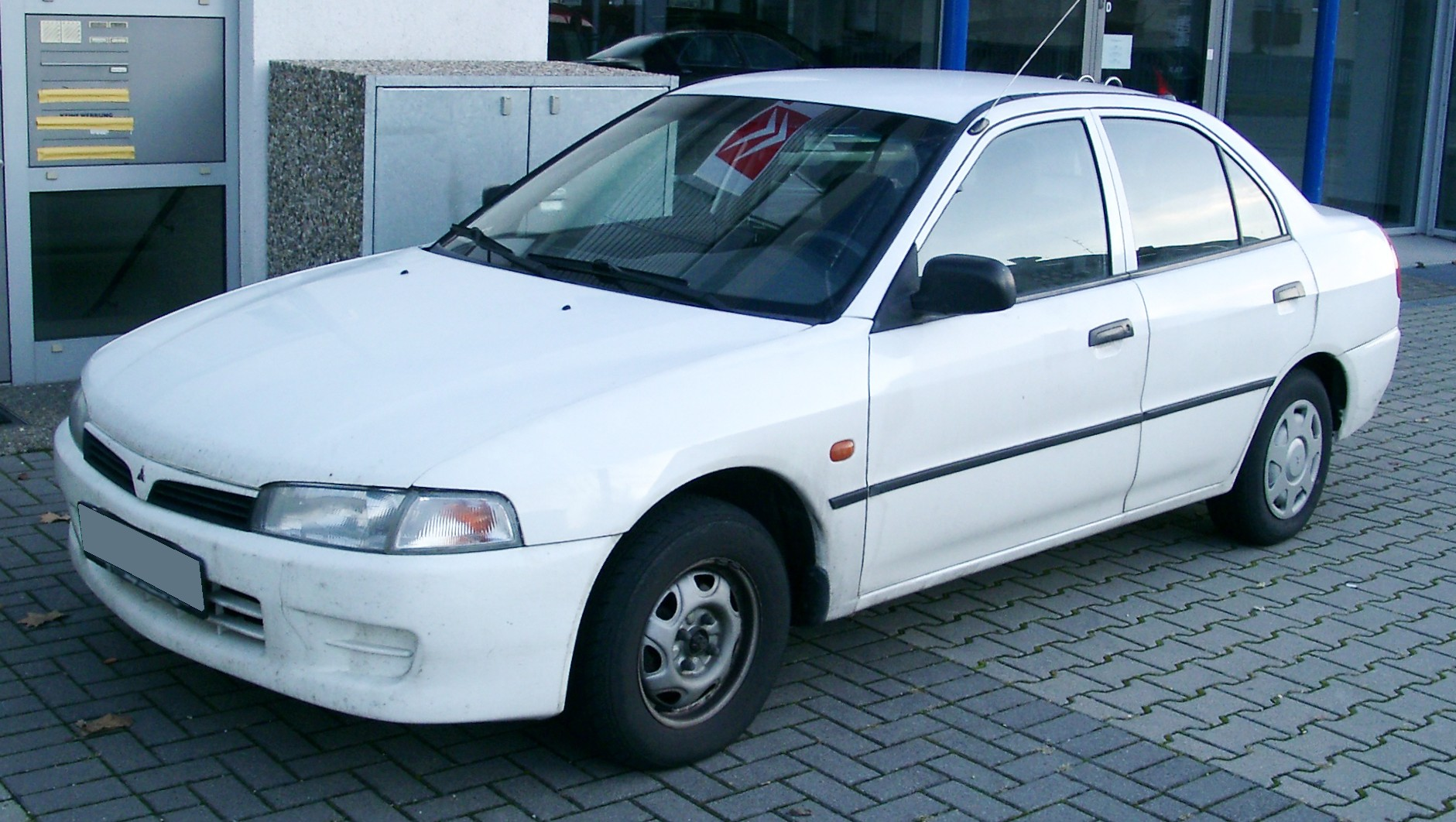
Mitsubishi Lancer

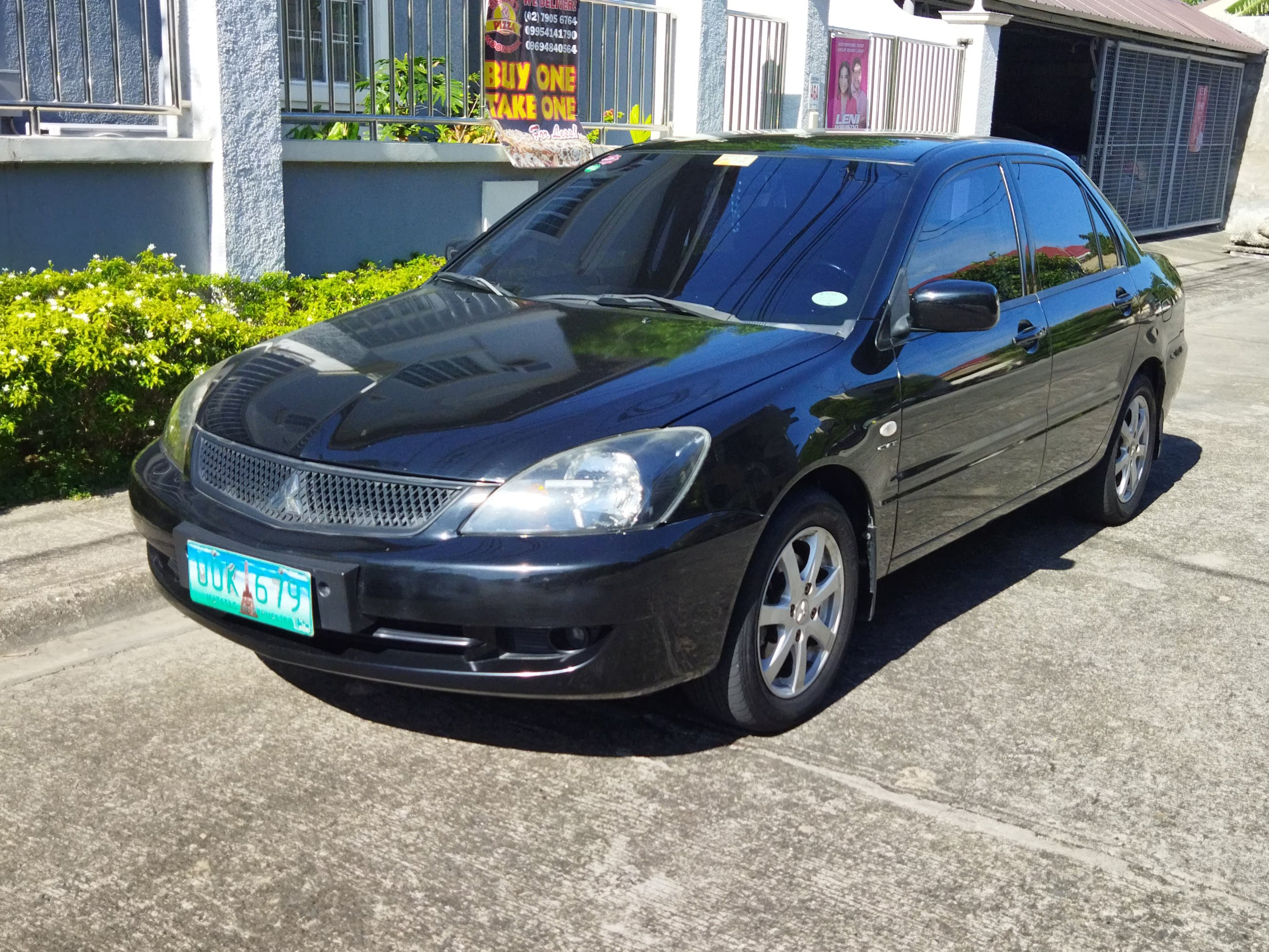
Mitsubishi Lancer Cedia

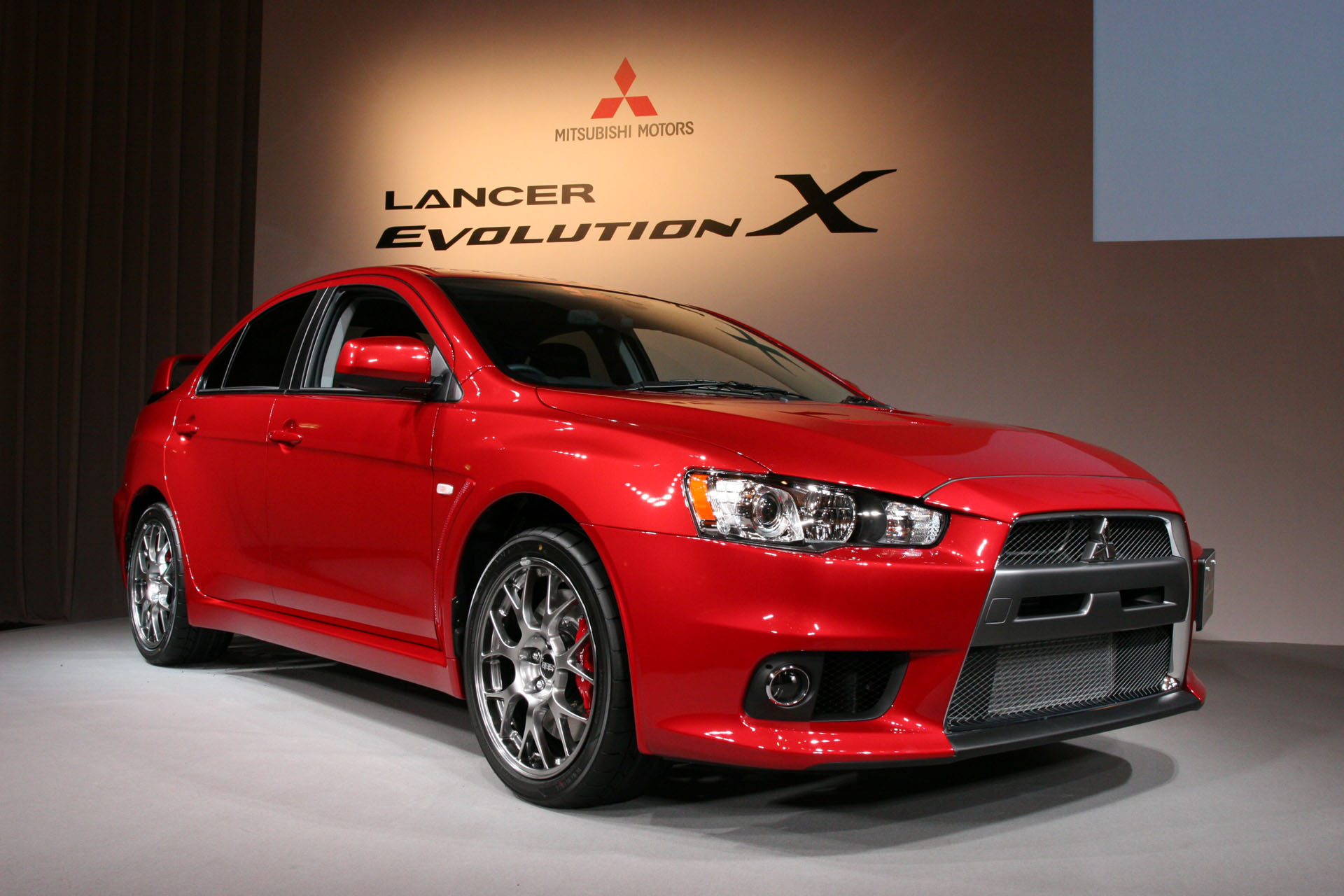
Mitsubishi Lancer Evolution X

=== Citroën joint venture ===
In 2017, CK Birla and the PSA Group announced a joint venture to build PSA cars in Hindustan's Tiruvallur plant. PSA also purchased Ambassador brand from Hindustan Motors. The Citroën C3 and C5 Aircross were launched in 2022.

== Hindustan models ==
=== Discontinued models ===
==== Passenger vehicles ====
- Hindustan 10 - based on 1947 Morris 10, replaced by Hindustan 122.
- Hindustan 122 and Hindustan 14 -based on 1948 Morris Oxford MO Series - replaced with Landmaster.
- Baby Hindustan based on Morris Minor.
- Hindustan Deluxe - based on 1948 Chevrolet Deluxe.
- Hindustan Landmaster - based on Morris Oxford Series II - 1954 to 1957. Made way for Ambassador range.
- Hindustan Ambassador - ceased production in May 2014. It was one of the longest running models in the world for 56 years.
- Hindustan Contessa - based on the British Vauxhall Victor FE with Isuzu diesel or petrol engines.
- Other Hindustan Ambassador derived models - Pushpak, Trekker and Porter - ceased production since April 2008 Multiutility Vehicles based on Ambassador chassis and engines (Half Ton Driveaway Chassis).

==== Commercial vehicles ====
- Lavender - a small truck with 1.8L petrol engine or 1.5L Diesel engine
- Winner 1.5 XD FBV/Semi Deck (in collaboration with Shandong Shifeng)
- MASCOT T-480 FC - commercial truck.
- RTV Ranger - Minibus

== Former/idle plants ==
- Pithampur, Madhya Pradesh (near Indore) - Built in the 1980s it was a state of art robotic engine assembly plant as well as commercial truck assembly line for then launched Isuzu F Series trucks. Later RTV & Winner were assembled here.
- Hosur, Tamil Nadu - Built for Off-Highway vehicles.
- Hind Motor, Uttarpara, Hooghly District, West Bengal - Closed since 2015. Oldest plant built in 1948, all Hindustan Ambassador badged vehicles were manufactured here.
- Tiruvallur, Tamil Nadu (near Chennai) - Built in the late 1990s for Mitsubishi range, later in 2015 started assembly for ISUZU vehicles until January 2016 when Isuzu moved to its new plant at Sri City in Andhra Pradesh.
