= NBC Bearings =

Indian bearings manufacturing company

NBC Bearing
- Industry: Engineering, factory automation, Bearing Manufacturer
- Founded: 1946; 80 years ago
- Founder: Mr B M Birla
- Headquarters: Jaipur, Rajasthan, India
- Key people: Rohit Saboo (President & Chief Executive Officer); Rajesh Premchandran (Chief Sales & Marketing Officer); Gourav Chaturvedi (Chief Financial Officer)
- Products: Bearings from 6mm to 2000mm in over 3100 sizes
- Brands: NBC Bearing
- Revenue: The company had a gross turnover of Rs 2111.37 crores in 2020-21
- Number of employees: 2800
- Parent: CKA Birla Group
- Website: nbcbearings.com

NBC Bearings is the brand of National Engineering Industries Limited (NEIL), a part of CKA Birla Group. National Engineering Industries (NEIL) was founded in 1946 and is engaged in the manufacturing of bearings for the automotive, railway, industrial, and aerospace industries. It sells bearings under the brand name NBC Bearings and exports them to at least 30+ countries, including the United States, Germany, Brazil, Japan, and Australia.

== History ==
National Bearings Company Limited (NBC) was founded in Jaipur by Shri B. M. Birla in a technical collaboration with Hoffman, UK in the year 1946. It began with the production of ball bearings from the year 1950. Following a political change in the princely state of Hyderabad, the company was renamed as National Engineering Industries Limited.

In June 2020, NEI acquired the European-based bearing manufacturer Kinex Bearings & Global Supply.

In 2022, NBC Global Ag also opened its Global Technology Centre NBC Global (Germany) GmbH in Germany to support innovation. NBC Global AG also established NBC Kaili, (Ningbo) Precision Bearing Company, in Ningbo, China.

In October 2023, NBC partnered with FOGTEC to provide fire detection and suppression systems to Indian railways.

== Facilities ==
The company has five manufacturing facilities located at Jaipur, Newai and Manesar and Savli (Vadodara). Apart from the bearing production, the company also produces Next- Gen products. The employee strength is 2800 across five plants.

In April 2024, NBC setup a new plant in Bagru, Jaipur district, Rajasthan, India.

== Capacity ==
NBC makes 260 million bearings annually across its five plants. The NBC brand commands a market share of 24% in the domestic market. Approximately 70% of NEIL's sales come from original equipment manufacturers and 30% from the replacement market. The turnover approximates 60% from the auto sector (OEM and aftermarket), 30% for railway products and 10% from the low volume industrial applications.

== Technology ==
NEIL uses a heat treatment machine (furnace) from Chugairo, Japan. The grinding technology is sourced from Izumi of Japan, Nova of Italy, LMT of Sweden and FMT of Italy. NEIL operates 22 grinding lines out of which 17 are used for Deep Groove Ball Bearing (DGBB) and five are used for Double Row Angular Contact (DRAC) Bearings. NEIL maintains technical collaborations with NTN (Japan) and Amsted Rail (Brenco, USA).

== Research and development ==
The company has developed a low torque bearing that can reduce friction up to 20%, which results in fuel efficiency. The company spends 1% of its turnover on R & D activities, with an eye on increasing it to 2% in the coming years. The company holds a number of patents born from its research activities.

== Awards ==
- Deming Award (2010)
- Deming Grand Prize (2015)
- ACMA Award for Technology Excellence (2015)
- CII Quality Award - Best TQM Model Company (2015)
- Iconic Brands of India Award (2022)
- CII National Digitech Circle - Gold Award (2025)
