= KPIT Technologies =

Indian multinational technology company

- Formerly: KPIT Cummins Infosystems Ltd
- Type: Public
- Traded as: NSE: KPITTECH; BSE: 542651
- Industry: Automotive
- Founders: Ravi Pandit; Kishor Patil
- Headquarters: Pune, Maharashtra, India
- Area served: Worldwide
- Key people: Ravi Pandit (Chairman); Kishor Patil (CEO & MD)
- Services: Product engineering Embedded software
- Revenue: ▲₹5,842 crore (US$610 million) (2025)
- Operating income: ▲₹1,229 crore (US$130 million) (2025)
- Net income: ▲₹839 crore (US$87 million) (2025)
- Number of employees: 12,727 (December 2023)
- Website: www.kpit.com
- Footnotes; Financials as of 31 March 2025.

KPIT Technologies Ltd is an Indian multinational corporation which provides engineering research and development (ER&D) services to automotive companies. The company is headquartered in Pune and has development centers in Europe, USA, Brazil, Japan and China, apart from India.

KPIT has filed 58 patents, published some research papers, and has won several awards for innovation.

== History ==
KPIT was co-founded in 1990 by Ravi Pandit and Kishor Patil, as KPIT Infosystems. Both of them are chartered accountants by profession, and they were partners in an accountancy firm, Kirtane & Pandit Chartered Accountants (KPCA). The company made its initial public offer (IPO) in 1999, which was 50 times oversubscribed.

In 2002, Cummins Infotech, the IT department of Cummins merged with KPIT, and the name of the company became KPIT Cummins Infosystems Ltd.

KPIT Cummins Infosystems changed its name to "KPIT Technologies Limited" in September 2013. This was in line with Cummins' decision to reduce its shareholding in KPIT, to focus on its core business of engine and generator manufacturing.

In January 2018, Birlasoft, an IT company, and KPIT announced their merger, with plans to immediately split into two new companies. In April 2018, this deal was approved by the Competition Commission of India. Following the corporate spin-off, one company focused on IT and the other on automotive was formed. The IT company operated under the name Birlasoft, and the automotive company operated under the name KPIT Technologies. According to the original plan, the shareholders of Birlasoft received 22 shares of the combined company for every 9 shares they held in Birlasoft, while the shareholders of KPIT Technologies received 1 share of the new KPIT Technologies company for every share they held in KPIT Technologies.

In an interview, Ravi Pandit, co-founder, chairman, and CEO of KPIT Technologies, commented upon this deal, "Segregating business IT and automotive tech businesses will provide sharper focus on each business." On 22 April 2019, KPIT Technologies Limited got listed on BSE and NSE. The transaction resulted in two publicly traded specialized technology companies – KPIT Technologies and Birlasoft.

On 6 June 2019, KPIT launched its new corporate logo.
