= Brij Mohan Birla =

Descendant of the Birla family

Brij Mohan Birla (1904 – 1981) was one of the scions of Birla family and an industrialist and philanthropist. He was the youngest and 4th son of Baldeo Das Birla. He was chairman of Hindustan Motors, Ruby General Insurance, India Exchange Ltd, NBC Bearing and was on board of several other Birla companies. He founded Hindustan Motors in 1942 and NBC Bearings in 1946. CK Birla Group is successor to his branch of Birla family. He was president of Indian Chamber of Commerce in 1936 and the Federation of Indian Chambers of Commerce & Industry for year 1954.

He was a philanthropist and there are many institutions which own its existence due to donations by him and his trusts:

- Birla Institute of Technology, Mesra near Ranchi was established in the year 1955 by him
- Birla Mandir, Jaipur
- B. M. Birla Planetarium, Chennai
- B. M. Birla Science Museum, Hyderabad
- B. M. Birla Heart Research Centre, Kolkata is named after him
- Modern High School for Girls, Kolkata was founded by him in 1952
- Rani Birla Girls' College, Kolkata founded in 1961
- Modern High School for Girls, Pilani
- Rukmani Birla High School, Jaipur, named after wife of Brij Mohan Birla
- B.M. Birla Science and Technology Centre, Jaipur.
