= RV3 =

RV3 may refer to:

- BOSS RV-3, an electric guitar effects pedal
- Mandala 3, the third mandala of the Rigveda
- RedVictor3, a heavily modified Vauxhall Victor
- Van's Aircraft RV-3, a kit aircraft
