= Andy Frost (autosports) =

British mechanic (born 1961)

Andy Frost is an automotive mechanic, speed enthusiast, international drag racer and owner of the Red Victor 2. He was born in Walsall, England on July 4, 1961.

== Career ==
Frost has won multiple awards (race), including the 1996 street eliminator series. He was runner up for the same prize in 2006 and 2007. He was also the co-creator of the World Street Race along with Trish Biro. He is a transmission specialist by trade.

== Red Victor ==
The 'Red Victor 2' is Andy Frost's ongoing project car. In a video on YouTube.com he estimates over £100,000 or around $200,000 Canadian of work has been done to the 1972 Vauxhall Victor. Included in the parts added is a twin-turbo 9.3 liter engine and a custom-built transmission designed by Frost and Penn Auto. The vehicle is "as aerodynamic as a brick", but is capable of reaching 189 miles per hour (304 km/h) on the track with the help of the 2,100 bhp (1,600 kW) power plant and a long list of modifications. Andy originally purchased the car for only £60 in 1981. He is now driving the Red Victor 3 which is the former world's quickest and fastest street-legal car in the 1/4 mile.

On September 13, 2014, during Hot Rod Magazine's Drag Week, Larry Larson took the world record street-legal ET with a time of 6.163, but did not beat the 230-mph record. This was later exceeded further with a 5:95 1/4 mile at 244 mph.
