= Hindustan Contessa =

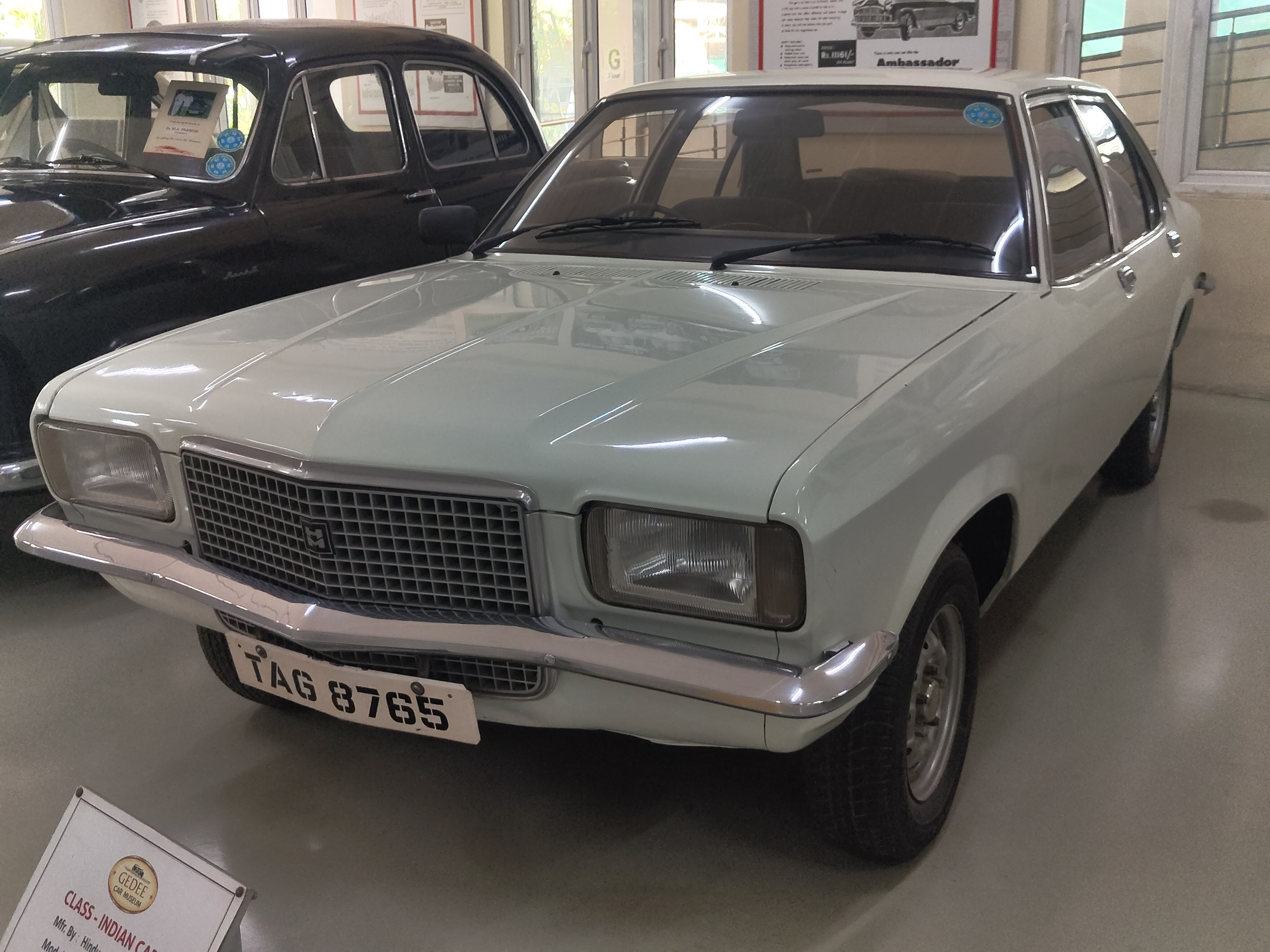
- 1980s Ambassador Mk.II

Overview
- Manufacturer: Hindustan Motors
- Production: 1984–2002
- Assembly: India: Uttarpara

Body and chassis
- Class: Large family car
- Body style: 4-door sedan
- Layout: FR layout
- Platform: GM V platform
- Related: Vauxhall Victor FE; Opel Rekord D

Powertrain
- Engine: 1.5 L BMC B-Series OHV I4; 1.8 L 4ZB1 I4; 2.0 L 4FC1 diesel I4; 2.0 L 4FC1-T turbodiesel I4
- Transmission: 4-speed manual (BMC); 5-speed manual (Isuzu)

Dimensions
- Wheelbase: 2,667 mm (105.0 in)
- Length: 4,591 mm (180.7 in)
- Width: 1,699 mm (66.9 in)
- Height: 1,432 mm (56.4 in)
- Curb weight: 1,200 kg (2,600 lb)

The Hindustan Contessa is an automobile which was manufactured by Hindustan Motors (HM) of India from 1984 to 2002. It was based on the Vauxhall VX Series of 1976 to 1978, itself a development of the Vauxhall Victor FE, and in turn ultimately derived from the Opel Rekord D. When introduced in 1983, it was one of the few Indian manufactured luxury cars in the market. One of its few indigenous competitors was the short-lived Standard 2000 which was based on the Rover SD1 and the Premier 118 NE was based on Fiat 124. The Contessa was a popular choice amongst government officials. It was nicknamed "The Indian Benz" due to its premium luxury and comfort.

== History ==
By the late 1970s, HM was ready to introduce a more modern car in the Indian market after having produced the ageing Ambassador for three decades. They were successful in acquiring the production tooling and technology of the Vauxhall VX Series, a car that was phased out in the UK in 1978. The production line was set up alongside the Ambassador at Uttarpara near Kolkata and the first test cars were ready by 1982. Series production was underway by the spring of 1984.

To keep development costs in check, the HM Contessa was introduced to the Indian market with the 50 hp (37 kW) 1.5 L BMC B-Series engine which also powered the Ambassador in a slightly modified form along with the Hindustan four-speed gearbox both from the early 1950s.The Contessa was thus a car introduced in 1984 with a 1970 body and 1950 engine and gearbox. The press was upbeat about the roomy interior and plush ride, but was critical about the grossly underpowered engine and equally primitive gearbox. Top speed was only around 125 km/h (78 mph), although there was also a version with higher 8.3:1 compression which offered 54 hp (40 kW).

=== Isuzu-engine era ===
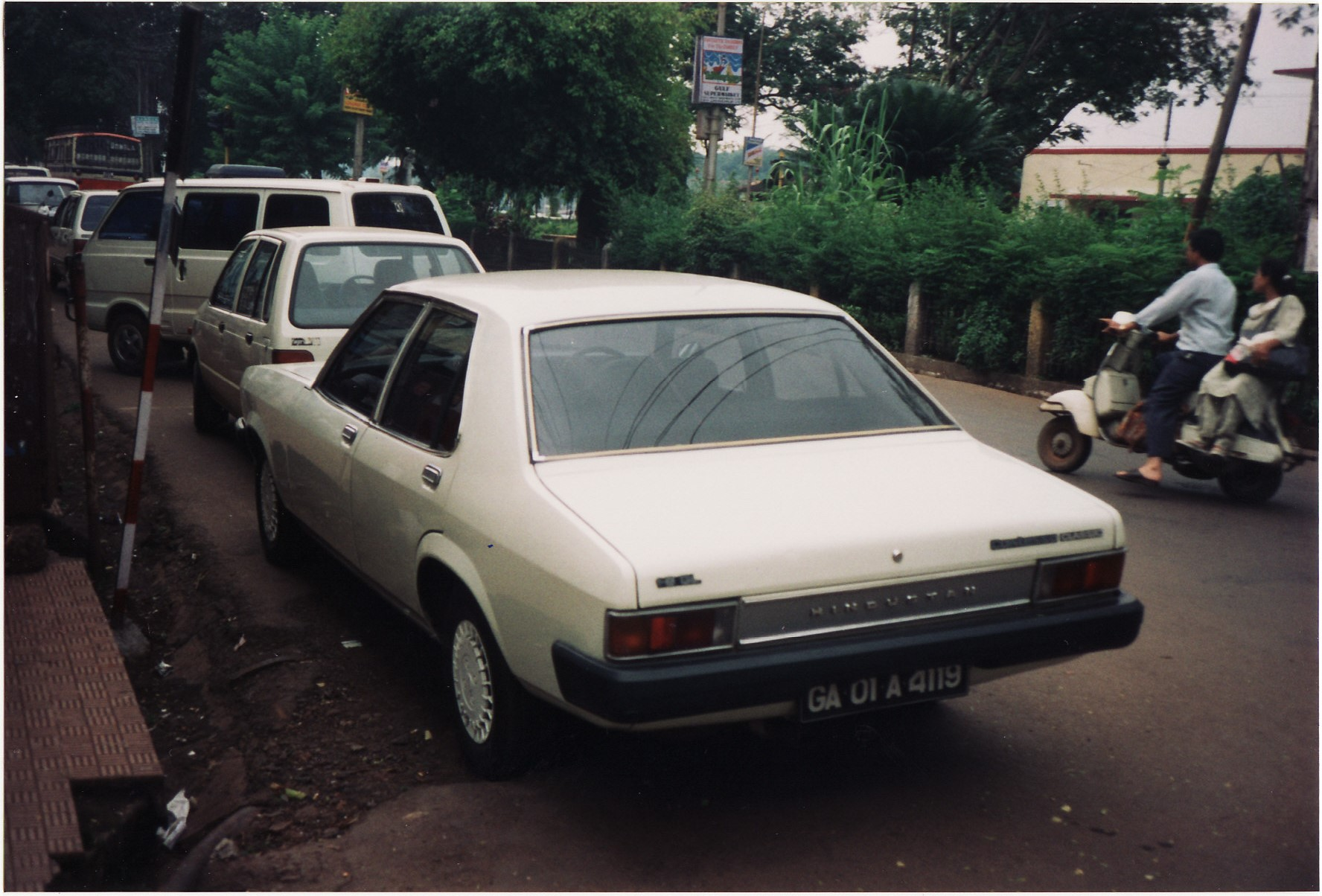
Rear of a Contessa Classic 1.8 GL (with facelifted bumpers)

By the late eighties, Hindustan had tied-up with Isuzu of Japan and started manufacturing their 1.8 L 4ZB1 petrol engine and matching five-speed gearbox for installation in the Contessa. The new car was called the Contessa Classic with distinctive "CLASSIC" and "1.8GL" badging on the trunk lid. The Isuzu-engined car quickly displaced the BMC-engined model, which was phased out in short order. The car achieved an increased top speed of around 160 km/h.

Even though the Contessa was based on a 1970s design, the interior was quiet and the seats were considered to be extremely comfortable. The basic design of the Contessa remained the same throughout its life, though HM made minor updates throughout the life of the model such as a revised grille during the 1990s. Numerous features like fuel injection, power windows, power steering, bigger bumpers, upgraded headlights, air conditioning, etcetera, were introduced in phases to keep the car appealing to the premium customer.

In the 1990s, Hindustan started manufacturing the 2.0 L Isuzu 4FC1 diesel engine that came to power the Contessa Diesel. The diesel was a reasonably strong seller, considering its high price. A turbo diesel version was introduced a few years later.

However, after the advent of more modern cars from GM, Ford, Fiat, Tata, etcetera, the demand for the Contessa began to wane. Maruti Suzuki had grabbed the lion's share of the market and intense competition between the new auto manufacturers brought modern fuel-efficient cars to the Indian marketplace in the late 1990s. The constant rise of petrol prices was the final nail in the coffin for the now comparably thirsty Contessa, which was phased out in 2002. Towards the end of production, there were three versions of this car; the 1.8 GLX (Isuzu petrol), 2.0 DLX (Isuzu diesel) and 2.0 TD (Isuzu turbo diesel).

== Specification ==
The specifications of the petrol engined Contessa are as follows:

=== Engine (1800 Isuzu) ===
- Type: Inline-four, SOHC with carburettor. MPFI from 2000 when new pollution norms kicked in, requiring fuel injection
- Fuel: Petrol
- Capacity: 1.8 L
- Bore / stroke: 84 / 82 mm
- Compression ratio: 8.5:1
- Maximum power: 88 bhp (66 kW) at 5,000 rpm for early fully imported assembled engines; 75 bhp (56 kW) for later engines assembled locally by Hindustan Motors
- Maximum torque: 135 N⋅m (100 lb⋅ft) at 3,000 rpm
- Cooling: Water-cooled
