= Red Victor 2 =

Customised 2,300 hp 1972 Vauxhall Victor

Red Victor 2 is a 1972 Vauxhall Victor owned by British mechanic Andy Frost. Frost purchased the car in 1981 and began customizing it as a hobby; it was once believed to be the fastest street legal car in the world, and now boasts over 2,300 hp. But since it is not a production car, it is not officially considered to hold the record.

The car was previously named the Red Victor One.

== Red Victor 3 ==
In mid-2011 performance specs for the still in production RedVictor3 were released by VXR. It uses an 8.8L Twin Turbo engine producing 3000 hp at the rear-wheel. Red Victor 3 will still be street legal, and use pump-gas on the street. Thus it will be quicker than Larry Larson's '66 Nova, which recently trumped Red Victor 1 as the fastest street legal vehicle. It was the world's quickest and fastest street legal car in the 1/4 mile as of June 2012, with a 6.59 @ 220 mph elapsed time.

A car built by Jeff Lutz called Mad Max, is as of 2016, the fastest street legal in the world with a time of 5.85 @250 mph.

== External Reading ==
- BBC Feature on Red Victor 2
- Official Red Victor Website
