= Envoy (automobile) =

Defunct General Motors of Canada division

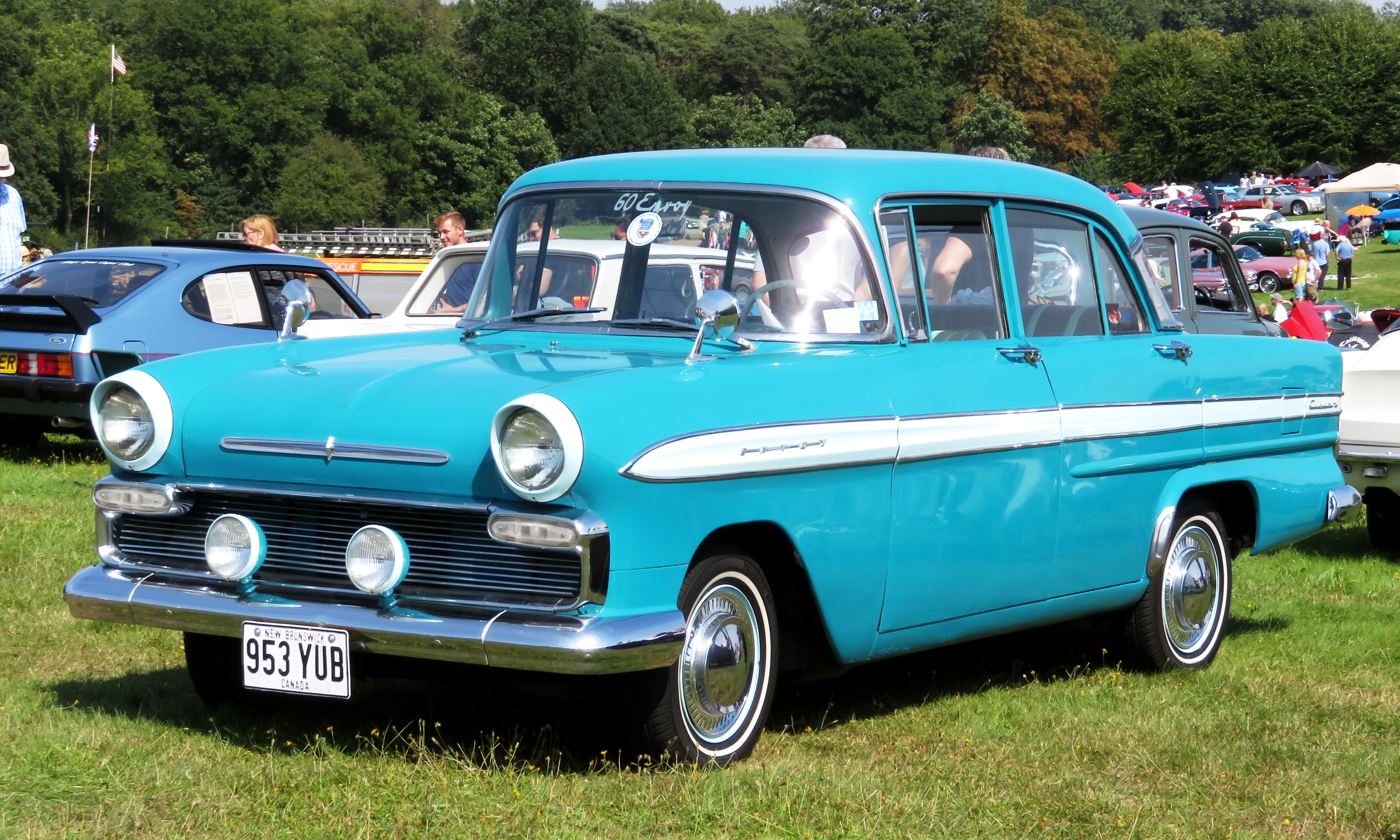
- Envoy Special (1960)
- Product type: Automobiles
- Produced by: GM Canada
- Country: Canada
- Introduced: 1959
- Discontinued: 1970; 56 years ago
- Related brands: Vauxhall

Envoy was an automobile brand created by General Motors of Canada and used to sell badge engineered British built Vauxhall and Bedford vehicles on the Canadian market from 1959 to 1970.

"Envoy" remained a trademark owned by Vauxhall and the name resurfaced as a trim designation in the 1990s, and was used to denote the entry level trim of various Vauxhall cars into the mid 2000s.

== Models ==
=== Envoy F Series ===
The Envoy name was first used in the Canadian market for a version of the Vauxhall Victor F Series 2. It was sold through Chevrolet-Oldsmobile dealerships at the same time as the Vauxhall version was sold though Pontiac-Buick dealers. Introduced in 1959, the Envoy models differed from the Vauxhalls in terms of trim and equipment. The saloons were initially sold in Envoy Standard and Special models and the estate version as the Envoy Sherwood Station Wagon. An up-market Custom Saloon was added to the range in 1960.

=== Envoy FB ===
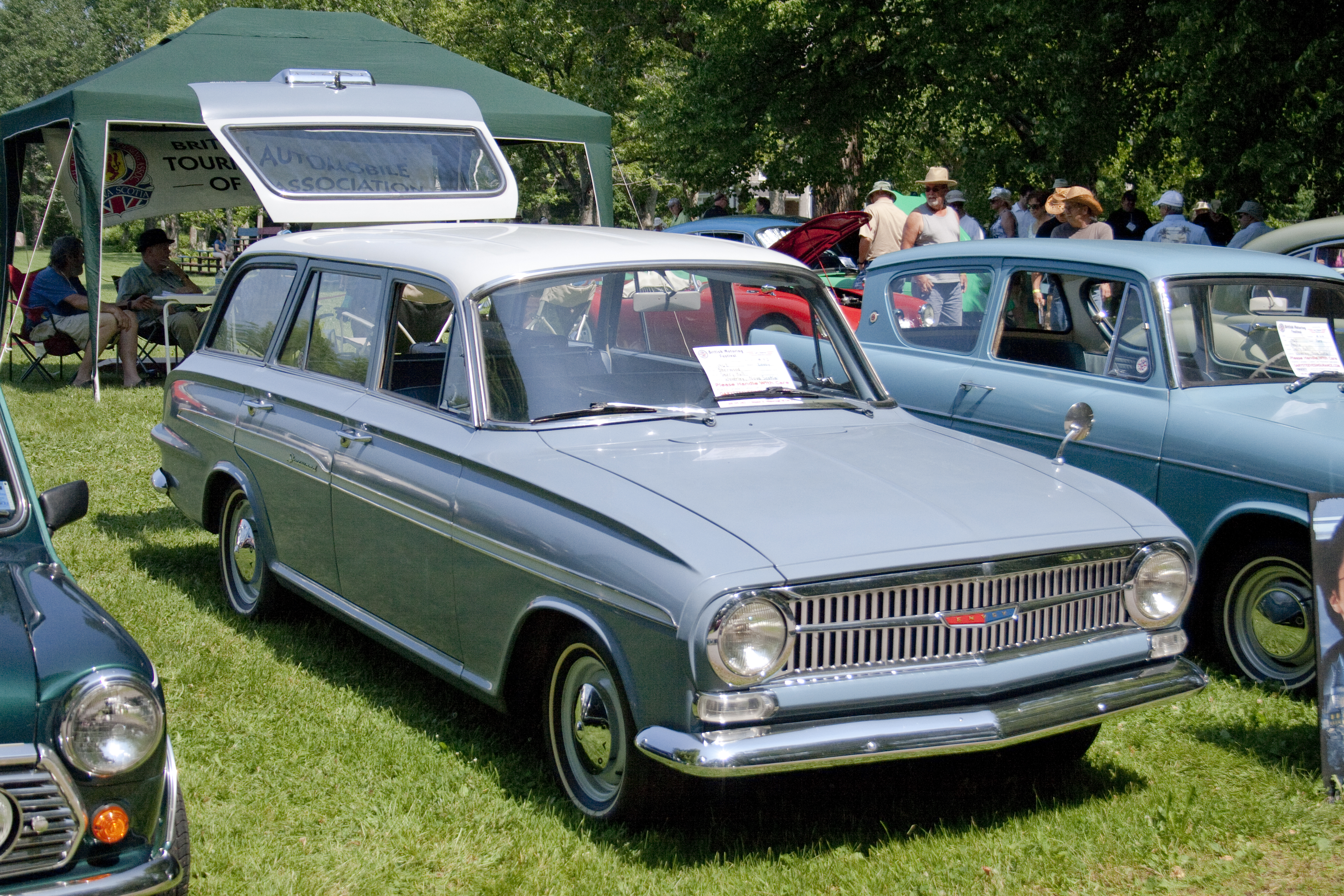
Envoy Sherwood FB Series Station Wagon

Envoy versions of the Vauxhall Victor FB were available through Chevrolet-Oldsmobile dealers from 1962 to 1964. Externally the Envoy FB resembled the European market Vauxhall VX4/90, but used Victor mechanicals and interior. The Envoy FB range again comprised Standard, Special & Custom Sedans and a Sherwood Station Wagon. The Envoy received an uprated 1594cc engine for the 1964 model year.

=== Envoy FC ===
The sedan version of the Vauxhall Victor FC was marketed as the Envoy Special and the estate version as the Sherwood Wagon. Again the Envoy used the exterior trim of the VX4/90.

=== Envoy FD ===
The Vauxhall Victor FD was sold under the Envoy name from 1968 to 1970. It was offered in 4-door Sedan and Estate Wagon variants with a choice of 1599cc and 1995cc 4 cylinder engines. Again the Envoy shared its grille with the Vauxhall VX4/90 model although its use for the Canadian Envoy FD model predated the release of the FD series VX4/90.

=== Bedford based models ===
==== Envoy CA ====
The Envoy name was used on Bedford CA van and minibus models on the Canadian market, where it was called the EA Envoy van. The various models were designated the EASV (Envoy half ton van), the EALV (one ton van) and the EAZ (half ton chassis only).

=== Vauxhall Viva based models ===
==== Epic HA ====
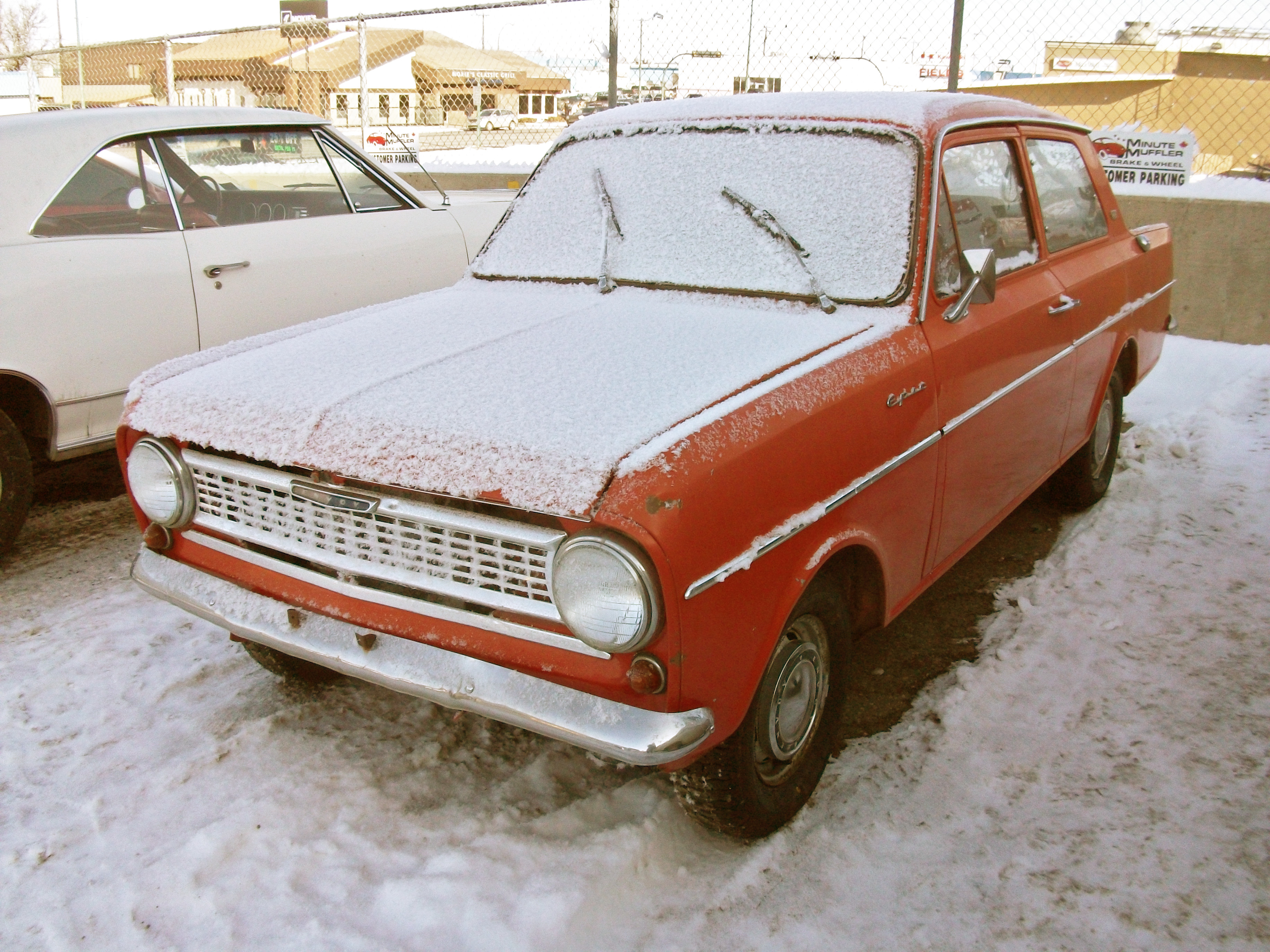
Epic HA. The HA carried both Envoy and Epic badges

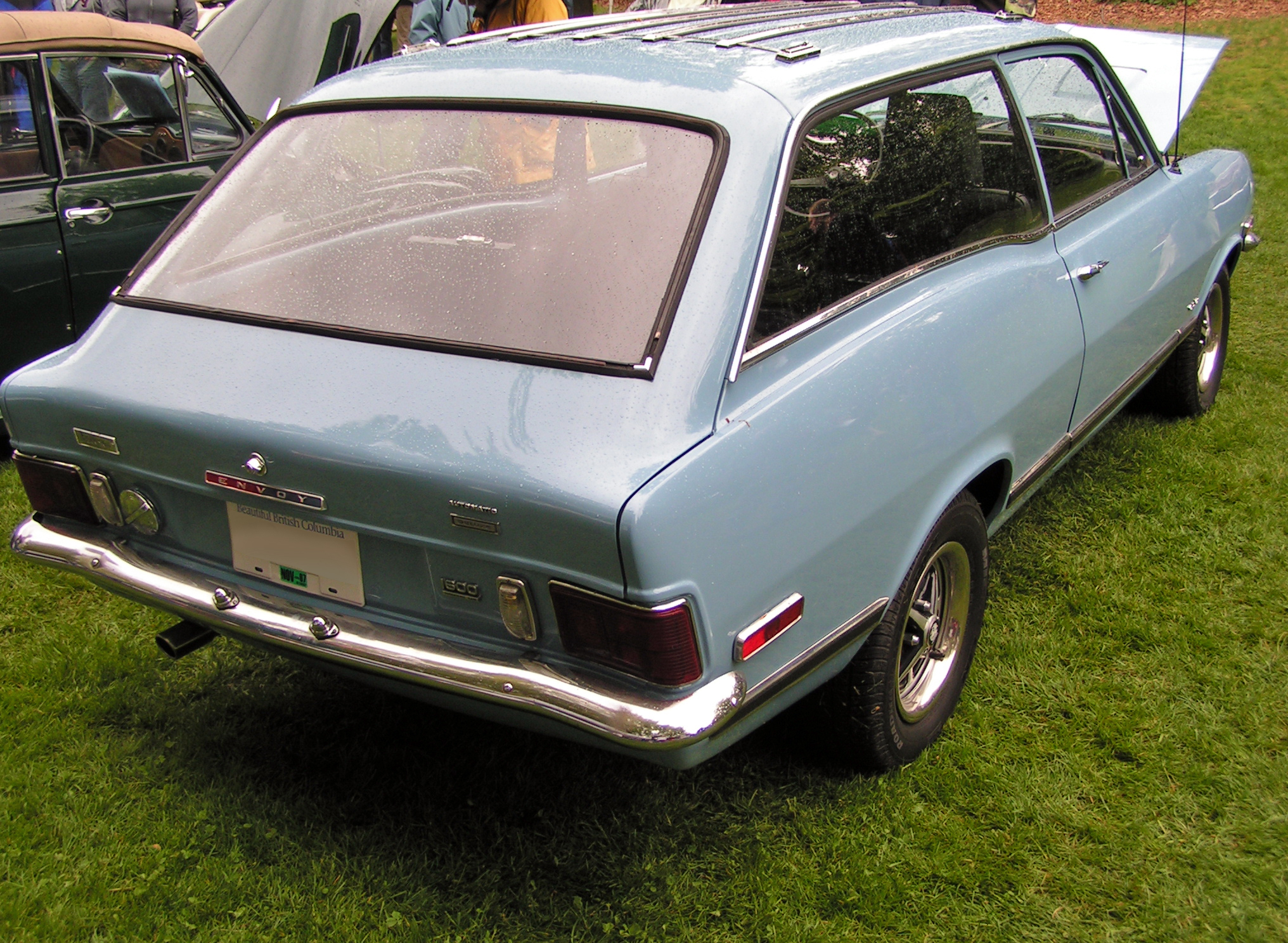
Epic HB Estate Wagon. The HB models also carried both Envoy and Epic badges

In 1964 the Vauxhall Viva HA was introduced in to the Canadian market as a Vauxhall and also as the Epic. The Epic differed from the Viva in that it used the grille and rear lights from the Viva SL. Although not marketed as an Envoy, it carried both "Envoy" and Epic" badging.

==== Epic HB ====
The Vauxhall Viva HB was launched in Canada in 1967 as a Vauxhall and also as the Epic. The Canadian models were distinguished by a four headlamp front grille, different trim, different body side mouldings and badging. The Epic HB was offered in 2 door sedan, 4 door sedan and Estate Wagon models. 1159cc, 1595cc and 2000cc engines were available. After the 1970 model year the Envoy brand was replaced with the Chevrolet Vega at Chevrolet-Oldsmobile dealers, while the HC Vauxhall Viva continued to be imported under the Firenza name until badge engineering returned with the Pontiac Astre, a Vega twin, becoming Canadian Pontiac-Buick dealers' small-car offering in 1973, two years before appearing in US showrooms.
