= Vauxhall Victor =

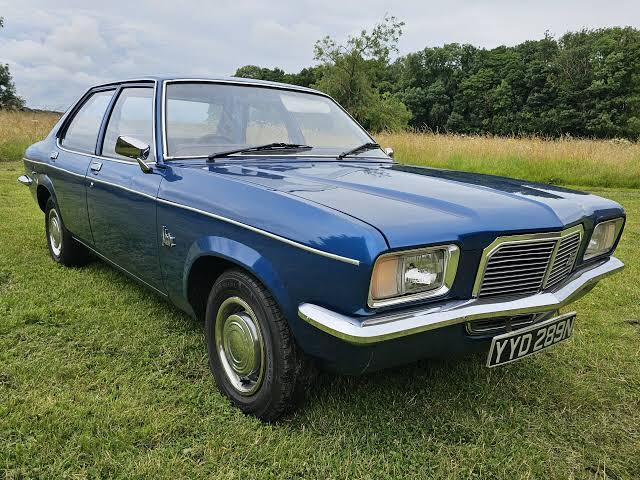
- Vauxhall Victor Saloon (FE Series)

Overview
- Manufacturer: Vauxhall (General Motors)
- Also called: Vauxhall VX4/90; Vauxhall Ventora; Envoy (Canada)
- Production: 1957–1978

Body and chassis
- Class: Large family car (D)

Chronology
- Predecessor: Vauxhall Wyvern; Vauxhall Cresta (FE series)
- Successor: Vauxhall Carlton; Vauxhall Viceroy; Vauxhall Royale

The Vauxhall Victor is a large family car produced by Vauxhall from 1957 until 1976. The Victor was introduced to replace the outgoing Wyvern model. It was renamed Vauxhall VX Series in 1976 and continued in production until 1978, by which time it had grown significantly and was viewed, at least in its home market, as a larger-than-average family car.

The last Victor, the Victor FE, was also manufactured under licence by Hindustan Motors in India as the Hindustan Contessa, during the 1980s and early 2000s, with an Isuzu engine.

The Victor was replaced in 1978 by the Vauxhall Carlton - essentially a badge engineered version of the Opel Rekord E.

The Victor briefly became Britain's most exported car, with sales in markets as far flung as the United States (sold by Pontiac dealers, since Vauxhall had been part of GM from 1925), Canada, Australia, New Zealand, South Africa, and Asian right-hand drive markets, such as Ceylon (now Sri Lanka), India, Pakistan, Malaysia, Thailand, and Singapore.

In Canada, it was marketed as both the Vauxhall Victor (sold through Pontiac/Buick dealerships) and the Envoy (through Chevrolet/Oldsmobile dealers). The Victor was also instrumental in giving Vauxhall its first in-house-designed estate, which complemented the four-door saloon.

== F Series Victor ==
Vauxhall Victor F
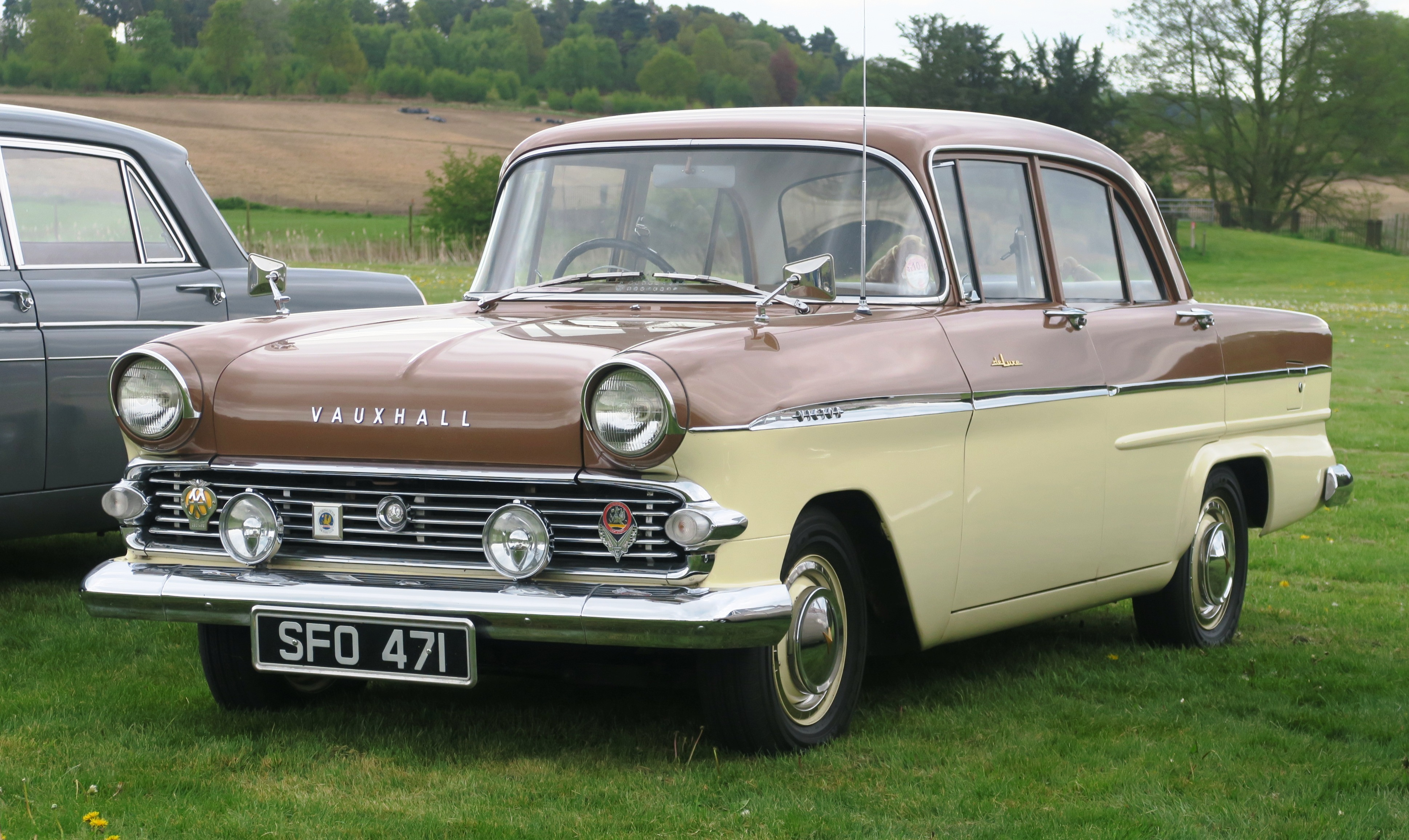

Overview
- Also called: Envoy; Vauxhall Voyager
- Production: 1957–1961; 390,745 produced.
- Assembly: United Kingdom: Luton; Australia; Belgium: Antwerp; New Zealand: Petone; Switzerland: Biel

Body and chassis
- Body style: 4-door saloon 5-door estate

Powertrain
- Engine: 1.5 L OHV I4
- Transmission: 3-speed manual

Dimensions
- Wheelbase: 98 in (2,489 mm)
- Length: 167 in (4,242 mm)
- Width: 63 in (1,600 mm)
- Height: 59 in (1,499 mm)

The original Victor, launched on 28 February 1957, was coded the F series and saw a production run of more than 390,000 units. The car was of unitary construction and featured a large glass area with heavily curved windscreen and rear window. Following American styling trends then current, the windscreen pillars (A-pillars) sloped forwards. In fact, the body style was derived directly from the classic ′55 Chevrolet Bel Air. Bench seats were fitted front and rear trimmed in Rayon and "Elastofab", and two-colour interior trim was standard. The Super model had extra chrome trim, notably around the windows; remnants of the signature Vauxhall bonnet flutes ran along the front flanks and the exhaust pipe exited through the rear bumper. The car was equipped with arm rests on the doors, door-operated courtesy lights, a two-spoke steering wheel, and twin sun visors. It was designed to compete with the Ford Consul Mk2, Austin A55 Cambridge, and the Morris Oxford Series III.

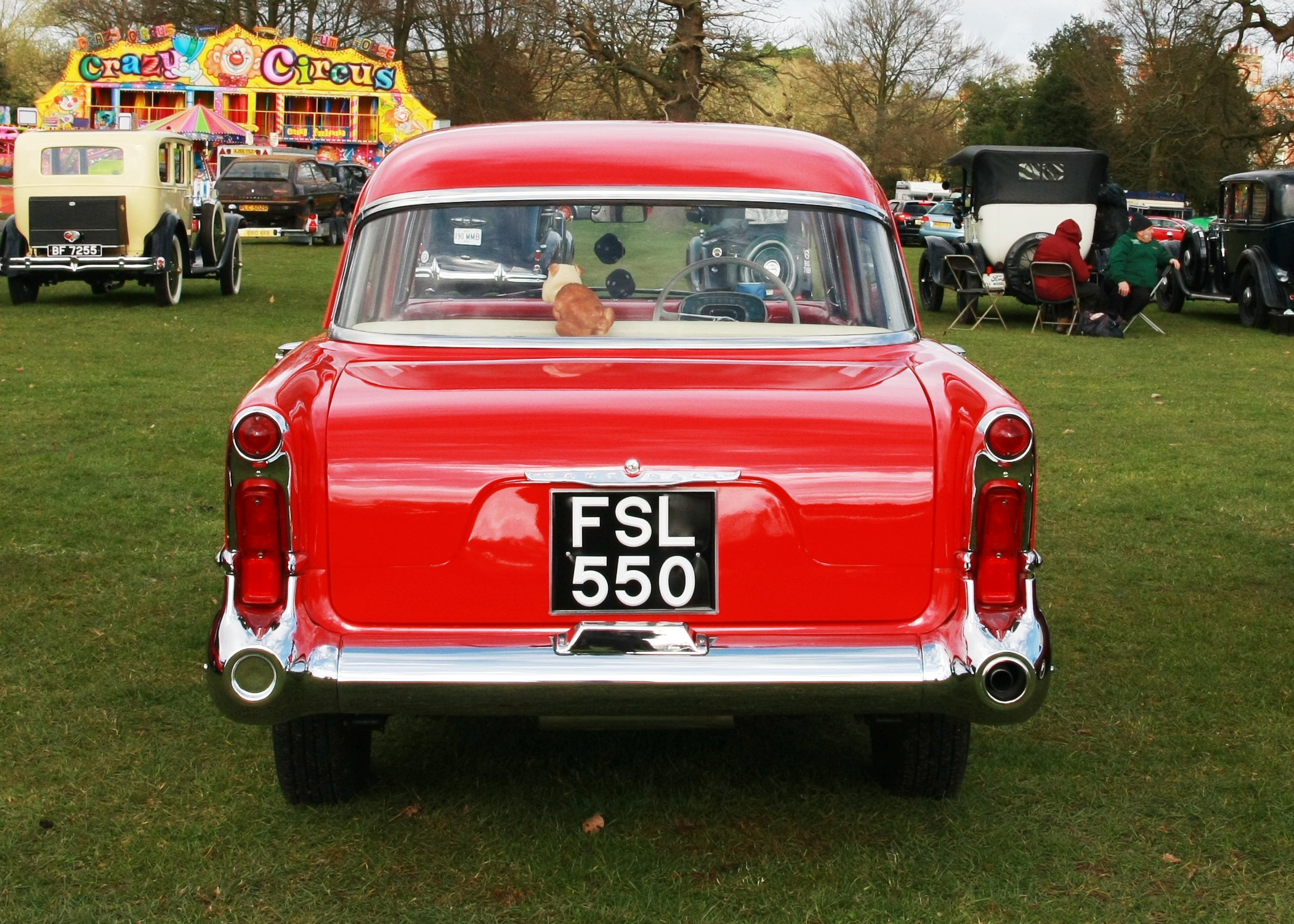
Vauxhall Victor F (1958) rear view treatment. On the early cars the exhaust gases emerged through a hole on the right side of the bumper.

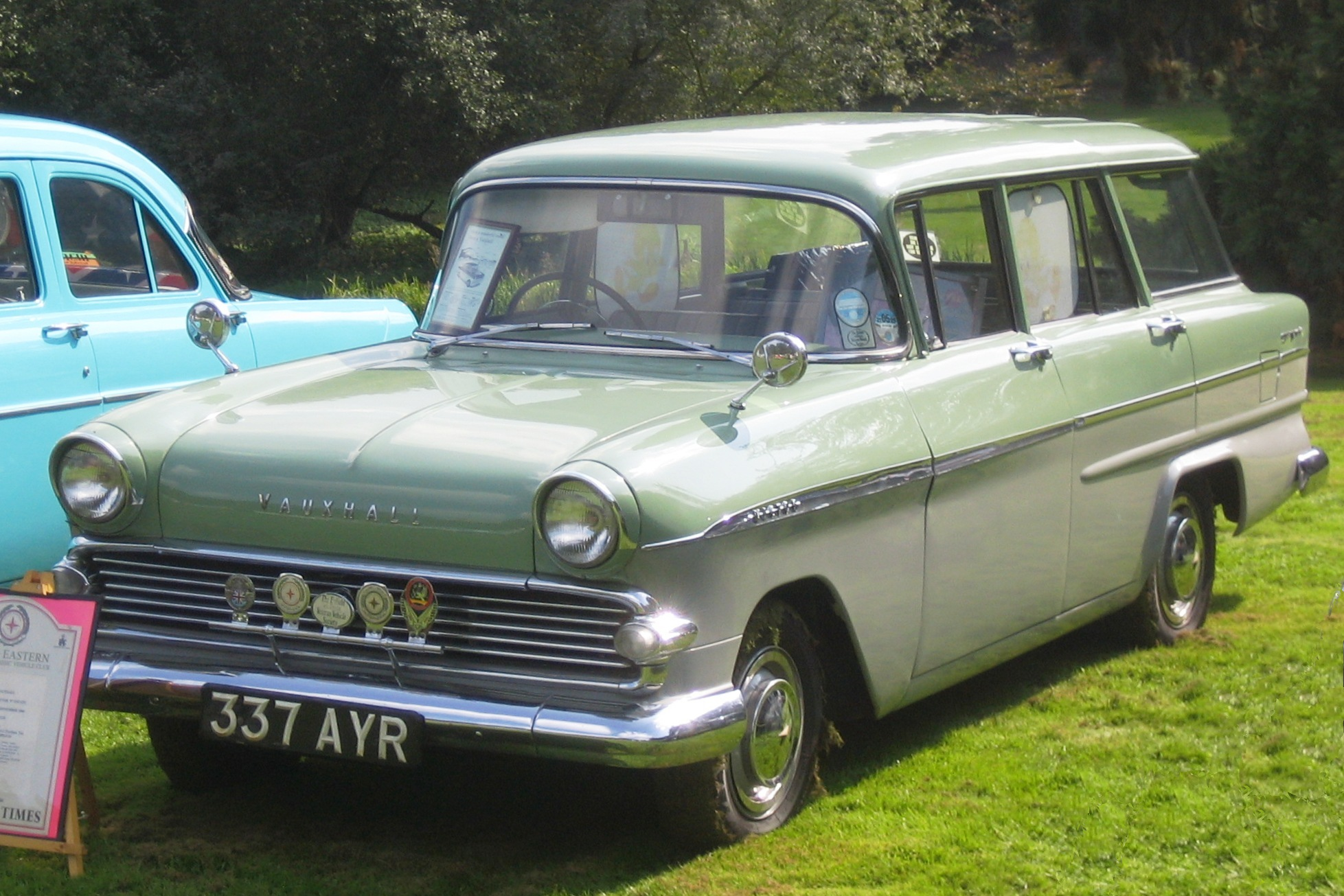
1961 model year Vauxhall Victor F Estate, featuring the simplified grille new that year and also showing the less sculpted rear doors and restyled bumpers introduced with the 1959 model year Series 2

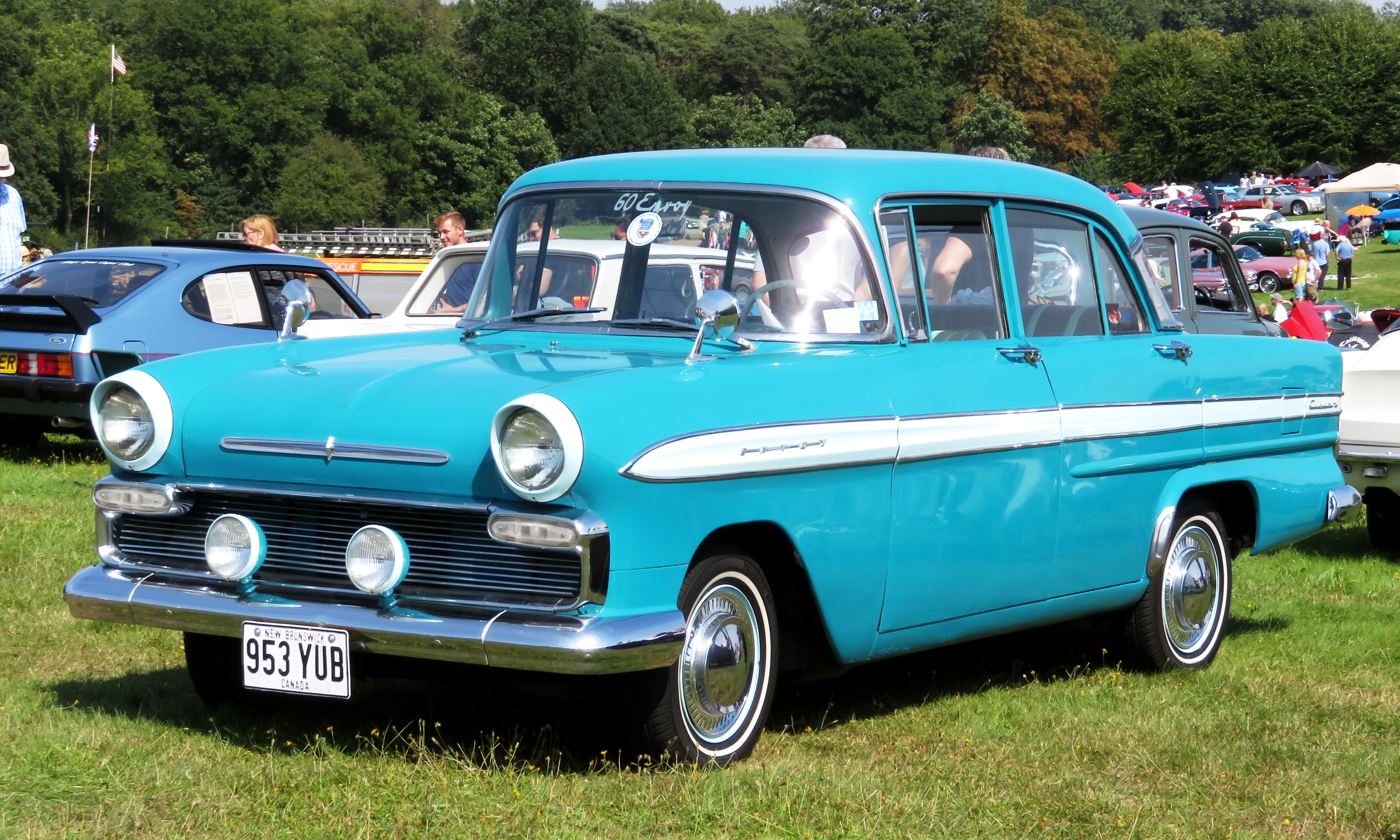
At the request of Canadian Chevrolet-Oldsmobile dealers, restyled "Envoy" variants were developed and sold in competition with the Vauxhall Victor sold through Pontiac-Buick dealers

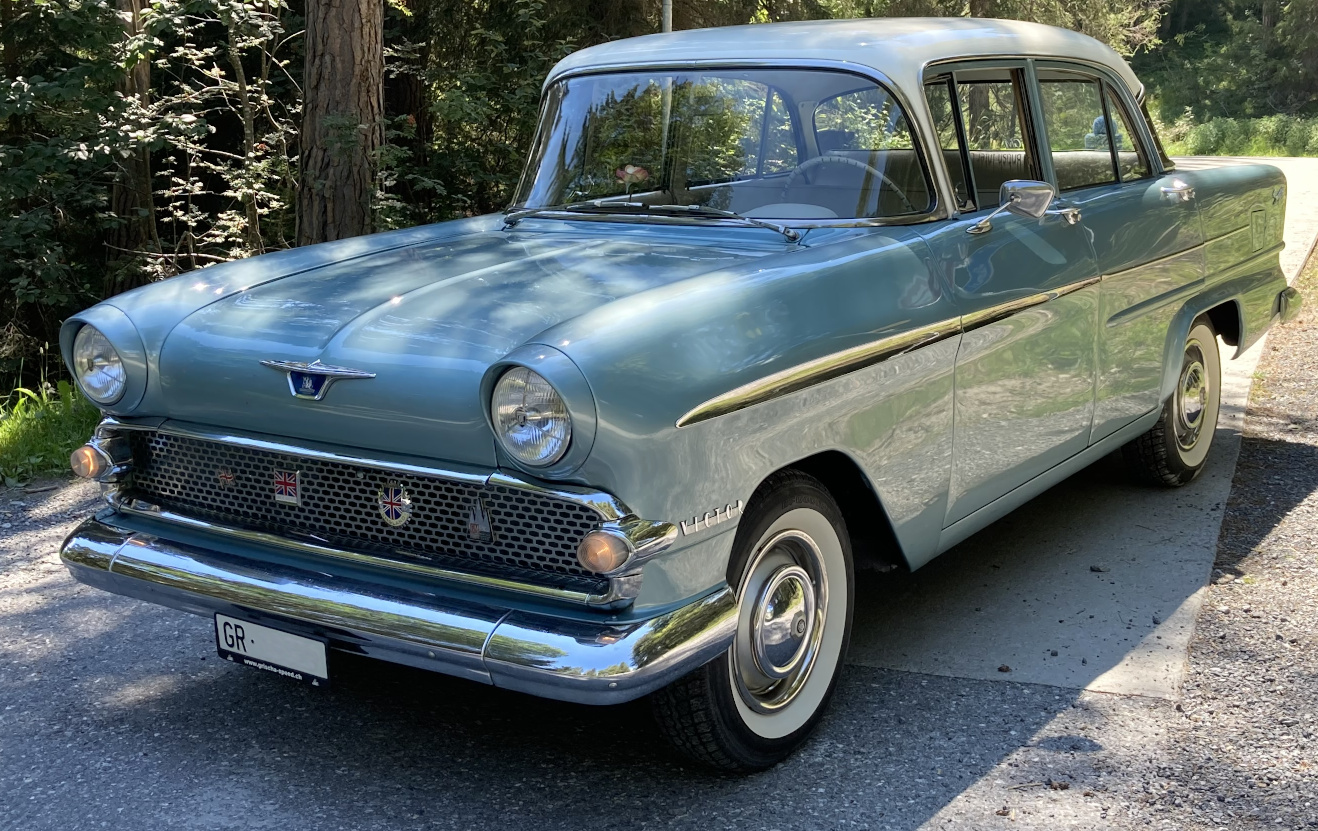
A Swiss-made 1960 Victor Super, "Montage Suisse" badge rightmost in the grille.

An estate variant was launched in 1958. When restyled, as the Series 2, the car lost all its '57 Buick styled bumper pods and the teardrop shaped Vauxhall flutes were replaced by a single chrome side-stripe running nose to tail. The sculpted "porthole" rear bumper tips, which rusted badly due to exhaust residue, were replaced by plain, straight ones. The old bumper ends continued to be used for many years on a variety of motor coaches and ice-cream vans.

Although the engine was of similar size to that of the outgoing Wyvern it was in critical respects new. Fitted with a single Zenith carburettor it had an output of 55 bhp (41 kW) at 4200 rpm and gained a reputation of giving a long trouble free life. This was also the year when Vauxhall standardized on "premium" grade petrol/gasoline, permitting an increase in the compression ratio from the Wyvern's 6.8:1 to 7.8:1. Premium grade petrol had become available in the UK at the end of 1953, following an end to post-war fuel rationing, and at that time offered average octane level of 93, but in the ensuing four years this had crept up to 95 (RON).

The Victor's three-speed gearbox had synchromesh on all forward ratios and was operated by a column-mounted lever. In early 1958 Newtondrive two-pedal control was available as an option.

Suspension was independent at the front by coil springs and an anti-roll bar was fitted on a rubber-mounted cross member. The rear suspension used a live axle and semi elliptic leaf springs. Steering was of the recirculating ball type. Lockheed hydraulic 8 in (203 mm) drum brakes were used.

A "Super" version tested by The Motor magazine in 1957 had a top speed of 74.4 mph (119.7 km/h) and could accelerate from 0-60 mph (97 km/h) in 28.1 seconds. A fuel consumption of 31.0 miles per imperial gallon (9.1 L/100 km; 25.8 mpg_{‑US}) was recorded. The test car cost £758 including taxes. The estate costs £931.

A Series II model was announced in 1959 with simplified styling. The new car was available in three versions with a Deluxe as the top model featuring leather trim and separate front seats.

F Series Victor sedans were assembled at General Motors New Zealand plant in Petone. Most were Supers with column shift and three-speed manual transmission, though some base models were made for government fleet contracts. Wagons were imported.

F type Victors were available in the United States and Canada through the Pontiac dealer network. They are the only Vauxhall-brand car ever offered in the US, however Vauxhalls continued to be available from Buick-Pontiac-GMC dealers in Canada (along with their unique Envoy-branded variants sold at Chevrolet-Oldsmobile dealers) until 1971.

== FB Series Victor and VX4/90 ==
Vauxhall Victor FB Vauxhall VX4/90 FB
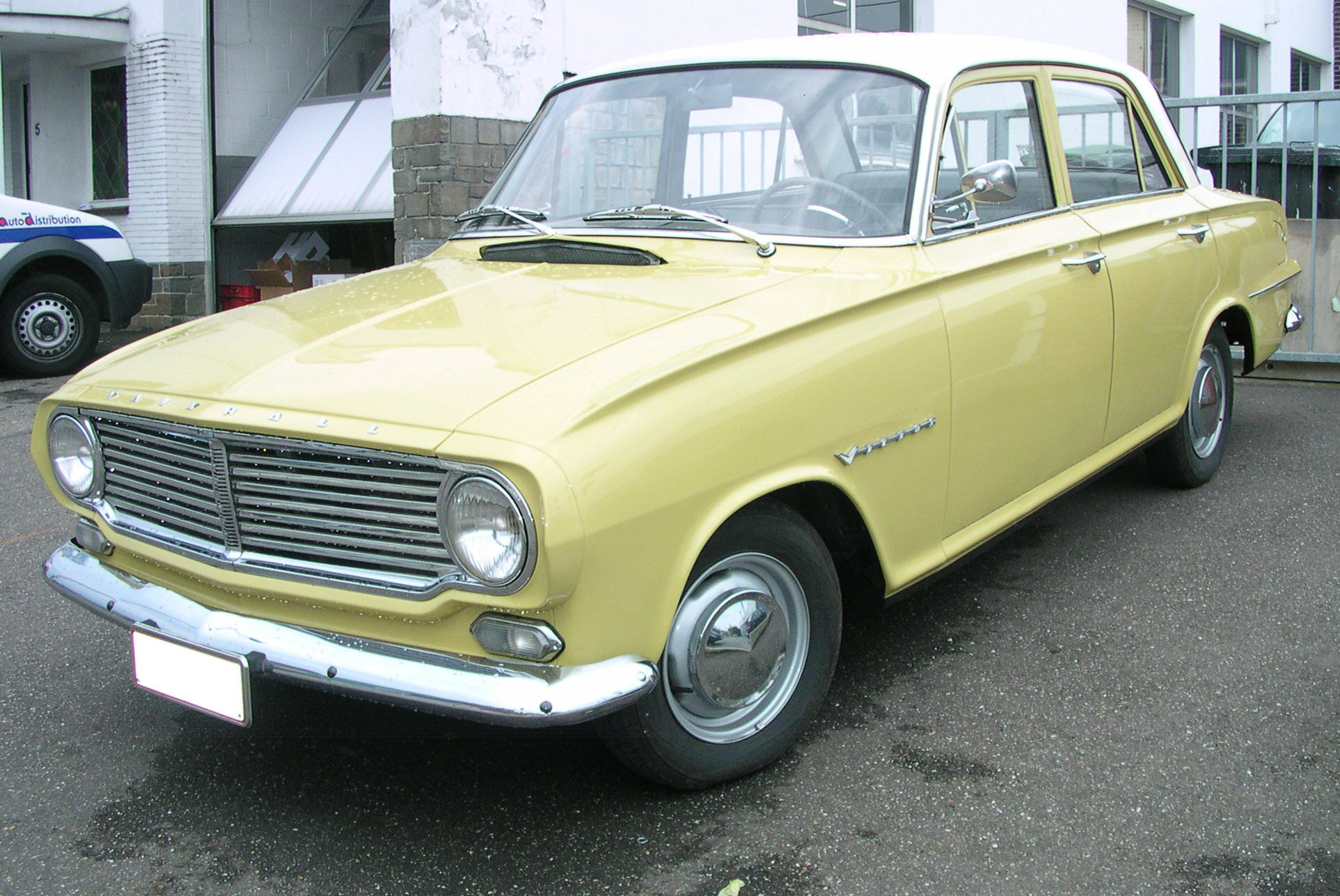

Overview
- Also called: Envoy
- Production: 1961–1964; 328,640 produced.
- Assembly: United Kingdom: Luton; Australia; Belgium: Antwerp; Denmark: Copenhagen; Portugal; Trinidad; New Zealand: Petone; South Africa: Port Elizabeth
- Designer: David Jones, Gerald Palmer

Body and chassis
- Body style: 4-door saloon 5-door estate

Powertrain
- Engine: 1.5 or 1.6 L Straight-4 ohv
- Transmission: 4-speed manual

Dimensions
- Wheelbase: 100 in (2,540 mm)
- Length: 173 in (4,394 mm)
- Width: 64 in (1,626 mm)
- Height: 58 in (1,500 mm)

The more cleanly styled FB announced 14 September 1960 ran until 1964 with a substantial improvement regarding rust protection. It was widely exported, although sales in the US ended after 1961 when Pontiac, Oldsmobile and Buick came up with home-grown compact models of their own, with the all-new GM "Y" platform (North America). Consequently, the FB only achieved sales of 328,000 vehicles by the time it was replaced in 1964. The body styling owed nothing to any US GM influence, the flat front and turtle-deck rear resembling some older US Fords. Mechanically, the main change was the option of a 4-speed all-synchromesh transmission with floor change but the previously used 3-speed all-synchro column change unit was still fitted as standard. The base (FBY) engine was also revised with higher compression ratio and revised manifolding increasing the power output to 49.5 bhp (37 kW; 50 PS). In September 1963 the engine was enlarged from 1508 to 1594 cc, identified as the FB30. The increased capacity coincided with a further increase in the compression ratio of the standard engine from 8.1:1 to 8.5:1, reflecting the continuing increase of the average octane level of "premium grade" fuel (on which the Victor unit had by now standardised) offered in the UK, now to 97 (RON). 1963 was also the year when front disc brakes with larger 14 in (360 mm) wheels became an option. Models with the larger engine had a revised frontal treatment with a block style grille element and revised parking lights at either lower extreme of the grille.

A Vynide-covered bench front seat was standard on the base model and Super Victor but individual seats were standard on the De Luxe and optional on the lower-priced cars. Other options included a heater, fog lamps, radio, screen washers, reversing light and seat belts.

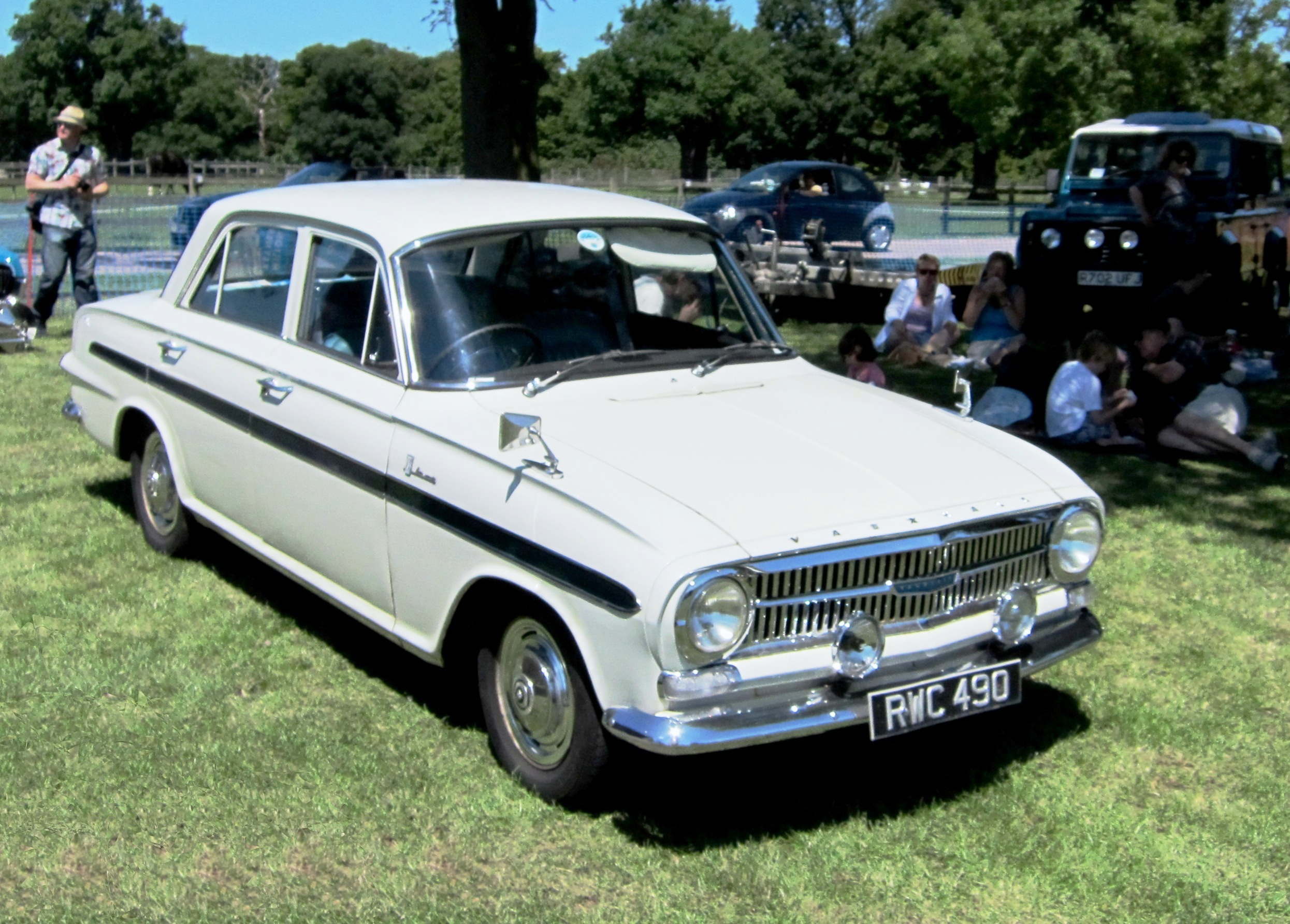
The FB was the first Victor to spawn a sporty VX4/90 derivative.

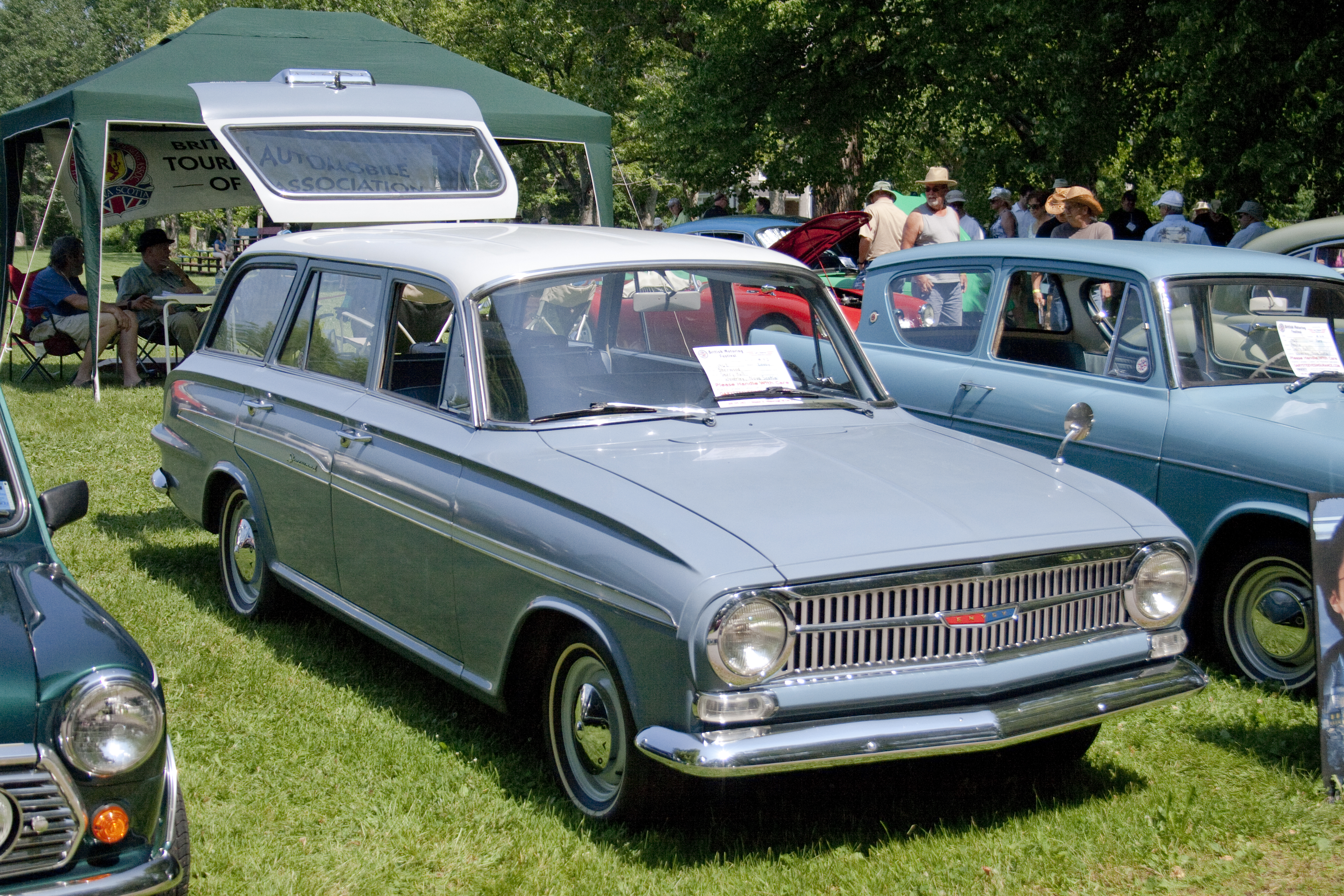
The Victor FB Estate was marketed in Canada as the Envoy Sherwood Station Wagon

A 1508 cc "Super" version was tested by the British magazine The Motor in 1961 and was found to have a top speed of 76.2 mph (122.6 km/h) and could accelerate from 0–60 mph (97 km/h) in 22.6 seconds. A fuel consumption of 32.2 miles per imperial gallon (8.8 L/100 km; 26.8 mpg_{‑US}) was recorded. The test car cost £798 including taxes of £251.

A sporty derivative, the VX4/90, announced separately in mid-October 1961 was also available. It was fitted with a twin-carburettor, a taller alloy head, high-compression expansion controlled pistons, and a nitrided EN19B steel crankshaft engine giving 71 bhp (53 kW) and servo-assisted disc brakes (same as Cresta brakes) on the front wheels. Externally the car was distinguished from the standard car by a coloured stripe down the side, revised grille and larger tail-light clusters. These cosmetic features were essentially similar to the Canadian-market-only Envoy models.

The VX4/90 was available only in saloon form with 4-speed (GM Opel) all-synchro gearbox, Lockheed front disc brakes, 14 inch wheels, front individual / bucket seats, full instrumentation including mechanically driven (from the distributor) tachometer and heater. The VX4/90 FBX engine also was upgraded to the 31FB, the larger bore size giving 1595 cc (97 cubic inches). With a change in rear axle ratio from 4.125 to 3.9, the VX 4/90 could now easily exceed 90 mph.

General Motors New Zealand assembled the Victor FB sedan line in New Zealand, in Standard and Super form with three speed, column shift manual and bench front seat. Four speed floor shift, a factory option in England, was not available nor were disc brakes. Wagons, Deluxe sedans and the VX4/90 were rare imports, many under the no-remittance, no overseas exchange, deposit scheme available to consumers at the time. The Kiwi models were facelifted for 1964 but did not get the revised rear licence plate surround introduced in the UK market.

== FC Series Victor and VX4/90 ==
Vauxhall Victor FC Vauxhall VX4/90 FC
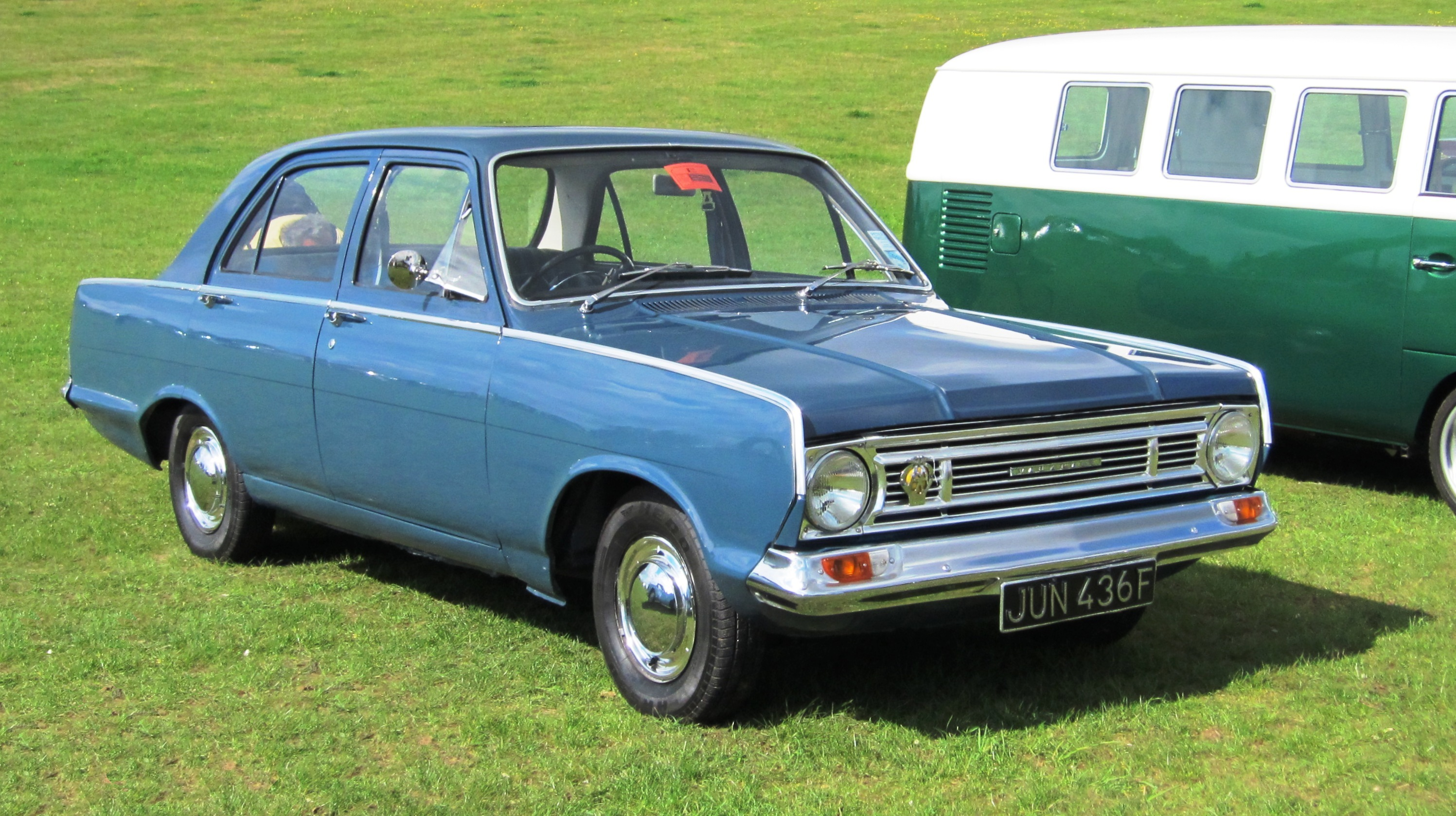

Overview
- Also called: Envoy
- Production: 1963–1967; 219,814 FC and 13,449 VX4/90 produced.
- Designer: David Jones

Body and chassis
- Body style: 4-door saloon 5-door estate

Powertrain
- Engine: 1.6 L Straight-4 ohv
- Transmission: 3- or 4-speed manual automatic

Dimensions
- Wheelbase: 100 in (2,540 mm)
- Length: 174.7 in (4,437 mm) (saloon & estate)
- Width: 65 in (1,651 mm)
- Height: 55.2 in (1,402 mm)
- Curb weight: 2,194 lb (995 kg) (Victor); 2,256 lb (1,023 kg) (VX 4/90)

The FC was the first Vauxhall to use curved side-window glass, allowing greater internal width: the Estate derivative was noted as being especially capacious for its class. Nevertheless, the public at the time regarded it as a qualitative downgrade after the pleasantly styled, conservative FB. As a countermeasure the FC Victor was marketed as the Victor 101, the name arising from the claim that there were '101 improvements' over the FB. Bench or separate front seating was offered, with three-speed column-change gearbox or the optional four-speed floor change. A 'Powerglide' two-speed automatic transmission was also available. Another US feature was that the optional radio was incorporated into the bright-metal dashboard trim. An innovative styling cue, which was adopted four years later by the Audi 100, was the incorporation of the side and indicator lamps in the front bumper, as had been common practice in the US for many years. The sculpted bumpers were, for the first time in the UK, contiguous with the body styling. The overall look of the car was unique in GM, with its slab sides outlined with brightwork seam covers incorporating the door handles. This, with the full width grille incorporating the headlights, was more reminiscent of the Lincoln Continental.

The FC (101) was the last Victor to have an engine with push rods and rockers operating the overhead valves. Victor FC models had racked up 238,000 sales by late 1967 when the 'Coke bottle styling' FD replaced it.

As with the rest of the running gear, the sporting VX 4/90 was developed from the FB series and offered an alloy head, higher compression ratio, twin-Zenith 34IV carburettors, stiffer suspension and additional instruments. Vauxhall took the VX4/90 seriously enough to offer an optional limited-slip differential, but few cars were ordered with it: the VX4/90 was, by this time, largely overshadowed by the less expensive Ford Cortina GT, which also had a higher profile in race and rally competitions.

Overall, FC survival numbers appear to be less than the F, FB and even FD series, due to bad rust problems, so examples are rare, unfairly forgotten, and undervalued.

Towards the end of the model run, in May 1967, a Victor 101 de luxe was road tested by Britain's Autocar magazine. The vehicle tested came with a four-speed floor-change gearbox and the 1595 cc engine delivering a claimed 66 bhp. A maximum speed of 81 mph (130 km/h) was achieved, which matched that achieved by a recently tested Austin A60 Cambridge and a Ford Cortina 1600 de luxe. The Victor accelerated to 60 mph (97 km/h) in 20.4 seconds, which was slightly quicker than the Austin but slightly slower than the lighter Cortina. The Vauxhall's overall fuel consumption for the test, at 23.1 mpg (10.9 L/100 km) placed it at the bottom of this class by more than 10%, while its manufacturer's recommended retail price of £822 was higher than that asked for the Austin at £804 or for the Ford at £761. (A lower price of £806 would have been available on the Victor if the test car had come with the three-speed column-change gearbox and all-round drum brakes.) The overall tone of the test was cautiously positive, with plaudits for the comfort, the lightness of the controls, the (optional) servo-assisted disc/drum brakes and the road holding, but adverse comments concerning the extent of the Victor's propensity to roll and the rather low gearing which accentuated the variability of fuel consumption according to driving style.

All Victors sported a different grille treatment for 1967, a final-year facelift that was standard Vauxhall practice at the time. This had a more finished and upmarket look with sturdier bars rather than the cheaper looking criss-cross element on earlier cars. The waistline chrome strip was also thinner.

New Zealand assembly continued again with the Super with three-speed manual column-shift transmission and bench front seat though some base models - minus the distinctive waistline chrome strips - were also built for government fleet business. Powerglide two-speed automatic became an option in 1966. As with the FB, there were no factory options. The model was facelifted for 1967 and, near the end of the run, a four-speed manual gearbox with floor shift and twin front seats replaced the three-speeder with bench seat. Some Deluxe models, wagons and VX4/90s were imported fully assembled from the UK but were quite rare.

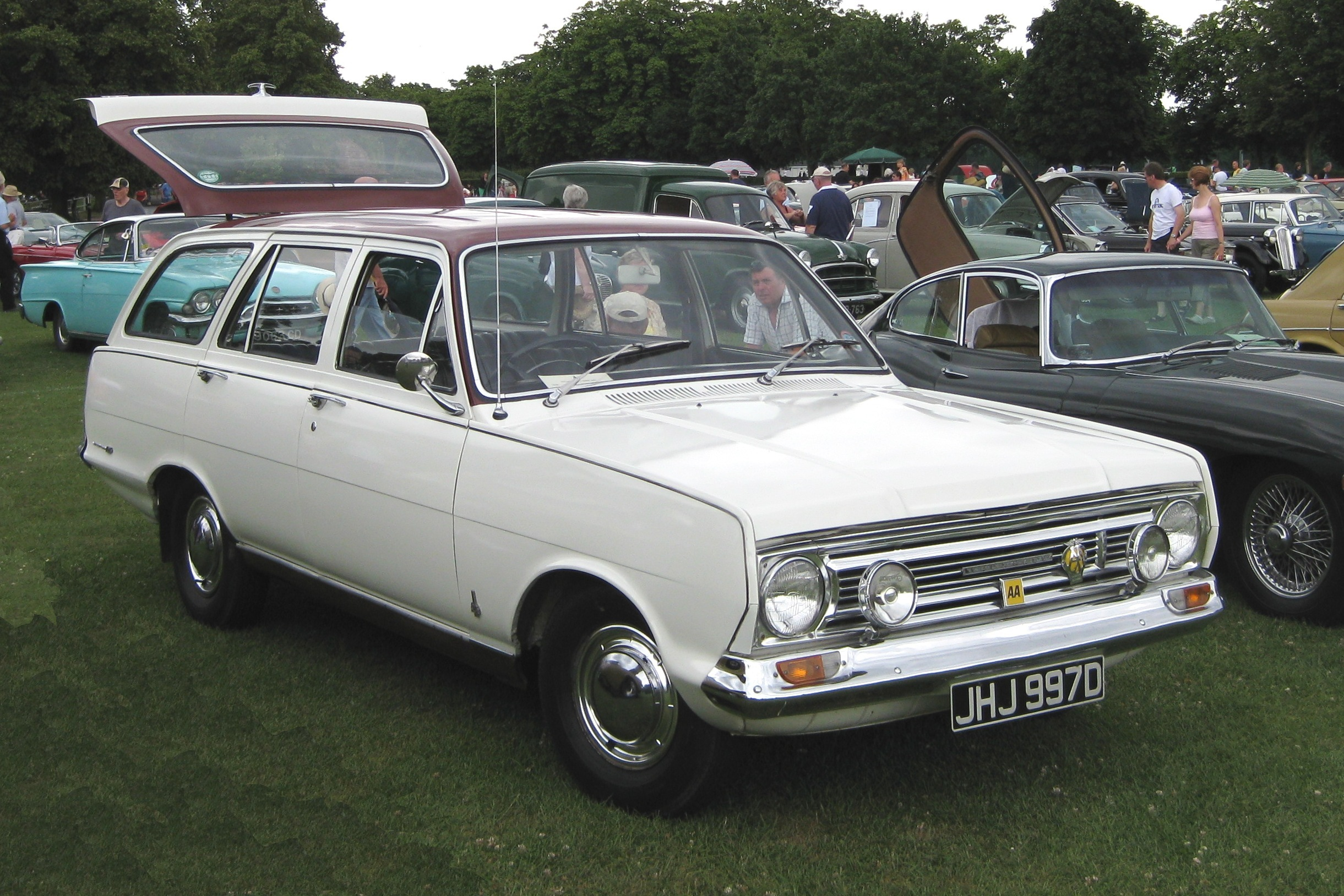
Vauxhall Victor FC Estate

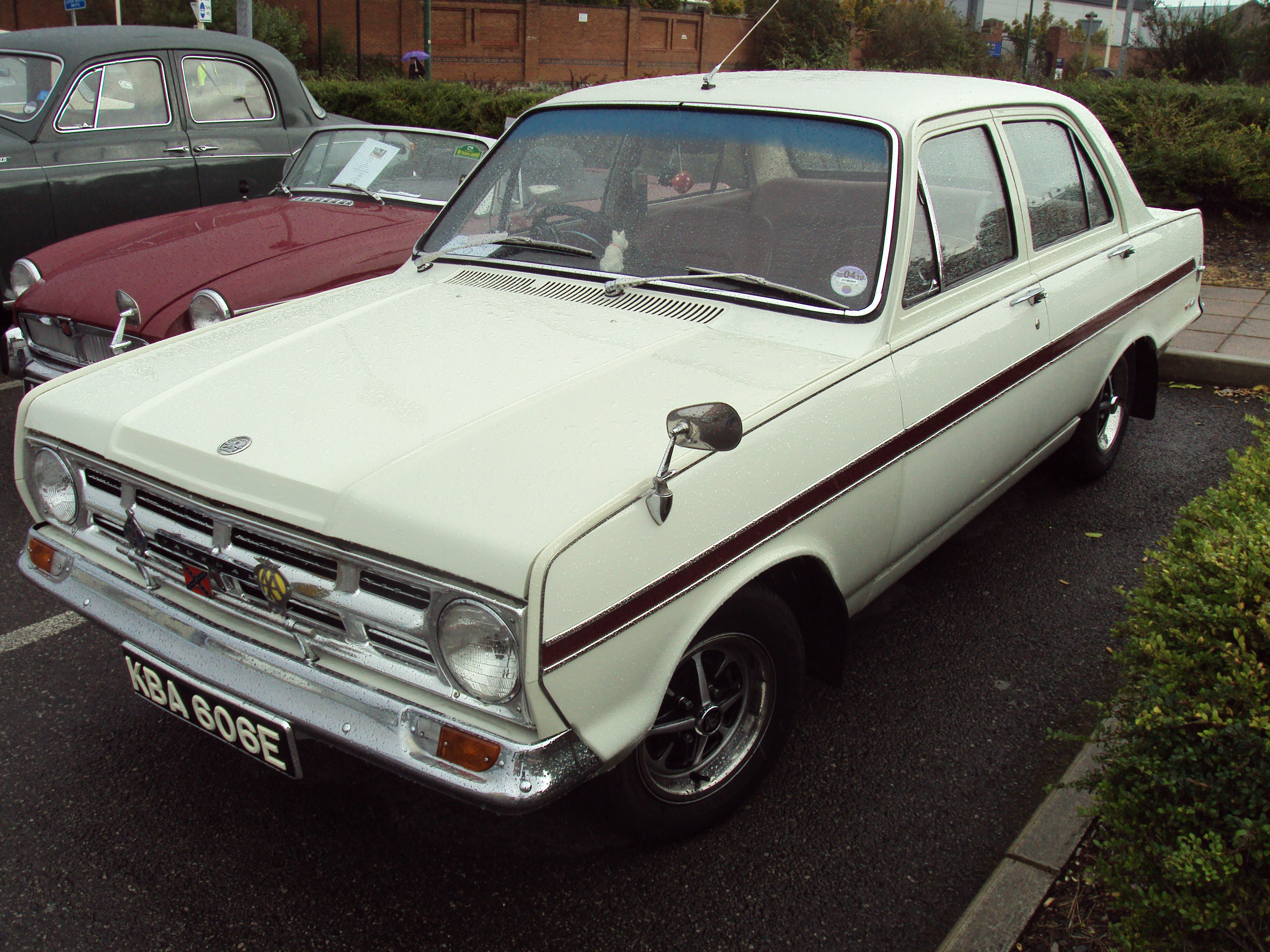
Vauxhall VX4/90 FC

== FD Series Victor, VX4/90 and Ventora ==
Vauxhall Victor FD Vauxhall VX4/90 FD Vauxhall Ventora FD
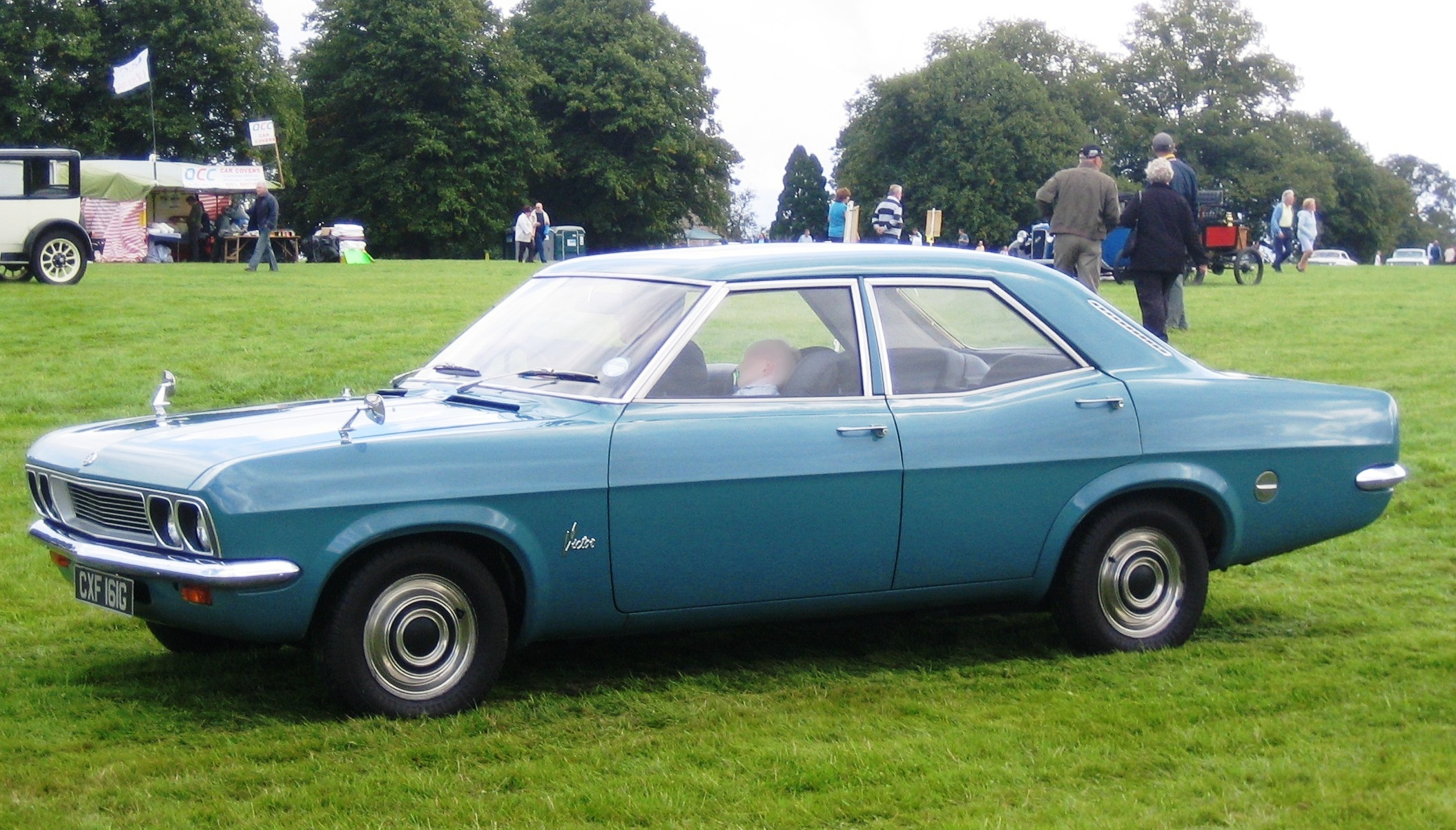

Overview
- Also called: Envoy
- Production: 1967–1972; 198,085 produced.
- Designer: David Jones, Leo Pruneau

Body and chassis
- Body style: 4-door saloon 5-door estate

Powertrain
- Engine: 1.6 L ohc I4; 2.0 L ohc I4; 3.3 L ohv I6
- Transmission: 3-speed manual (column); 4-speed manual (floor); Borg-Warner 3-speed automatic (4 cyl engines till 1969); G M Powerglide 3-speed automatic (6 cyl engines from 1968: all engines from late 1969)

Dimensions
- Wheelbase: 102 in (2,591 mm)
- Length: 177 in (4,496 mm) (saloon & estate)
- Width: 67 in (1,702 mm)
- Height: 52.5 in (1,334 mm)
- Curb weight: 2,320 lb (1,052 kg) (Victor); 2,553 lb (1,158 kg) (Ventora)

The FD was released at a time when the UK was undergoing a currency crisis as well as increasingly militant labour relations, resulting in rising prices and reduced quality. The FD Victor was inspired by the contemporary "Coke bottle styling" which had emanated from Detroit USA, five years before Ford's Cortina MK III. Fitted with all-new 1599 cc and 1975 cc engines that were the first British mass produced belt-driven overhead camshaft engines, the Slant Four was advanced for its time and application. The car also featured a bonded-in windscreen, the first for a mass produced car. The suspension design of the car was more sophisticated than most other British mass-produced efforts of the time, with a live axle located by trailing arms and a Panhard rod and sprung on coil springs instead of the traditional leaf springs, and a double wishbone front suspension assembly. The FD Victor was first shown at the October 1967 British Motor Show. where it was dubbed "Car of The Show" and also received the Don Safety Award.

The FD, however, departed from the traditional Victor family car bench front seat norm (there were still models with bench seats however) and could be ordered with comfortable contoured bucket seating front and rear. This was standard on the Victor 2000 (later 2000 SL with the facelift for 1970) and optional on the Victor 1600 (renamed Super with the 1970 facelift). Bucket seats were standard on the more sporty VX4/90 and six-cylinder Ventora versions, with the latter having reclining backrests as standard from 1969. All bucket seat models dispensed with the column shift and adopted a four-speed floor shift, with overdrive standard on manual VX4/90s and optional on the Ventora.

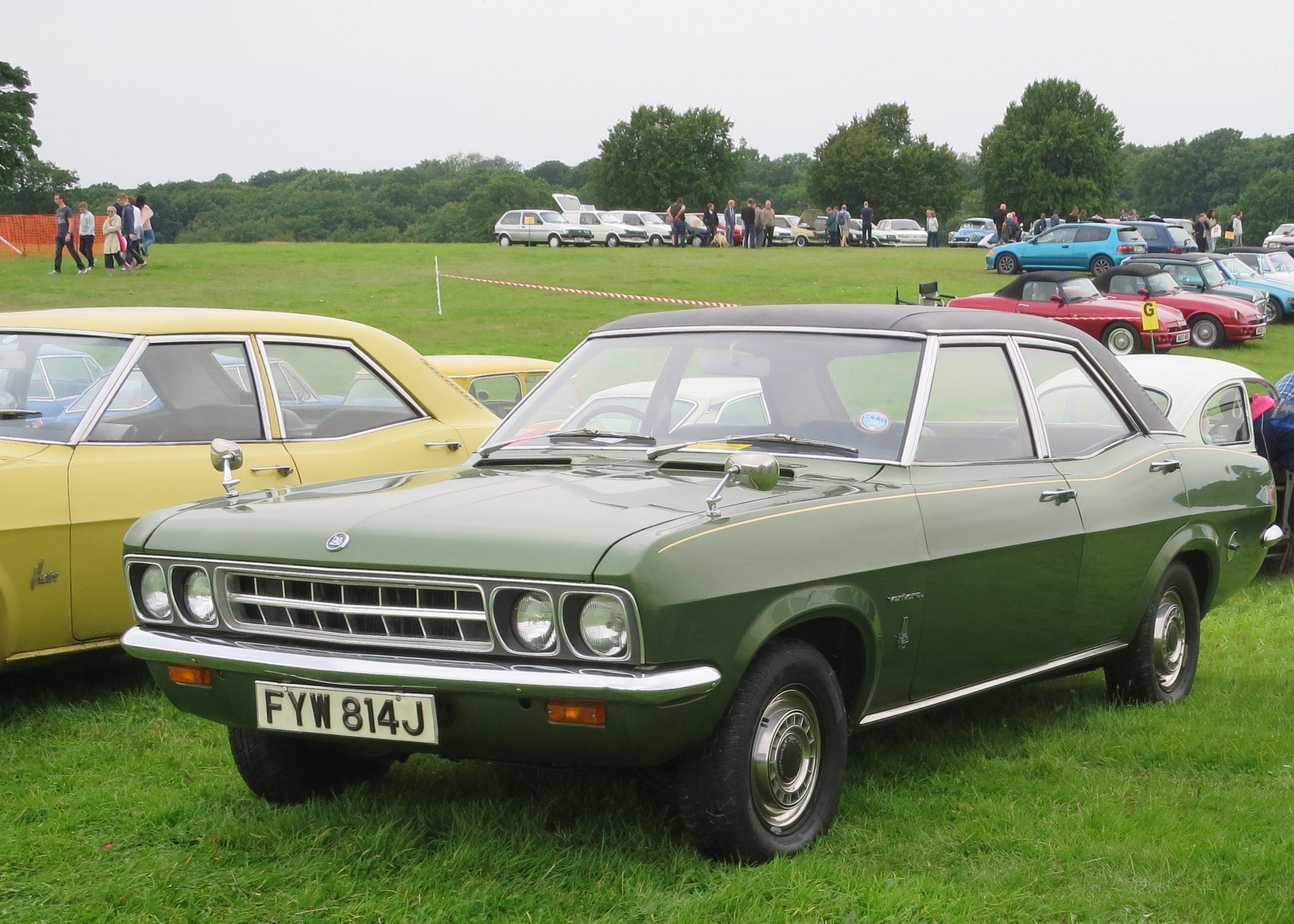
The Ventora combined the body of the Victor FD (from 1972 Victor FE) with the 3.3-litre engine from the Vauxhall Cresta.

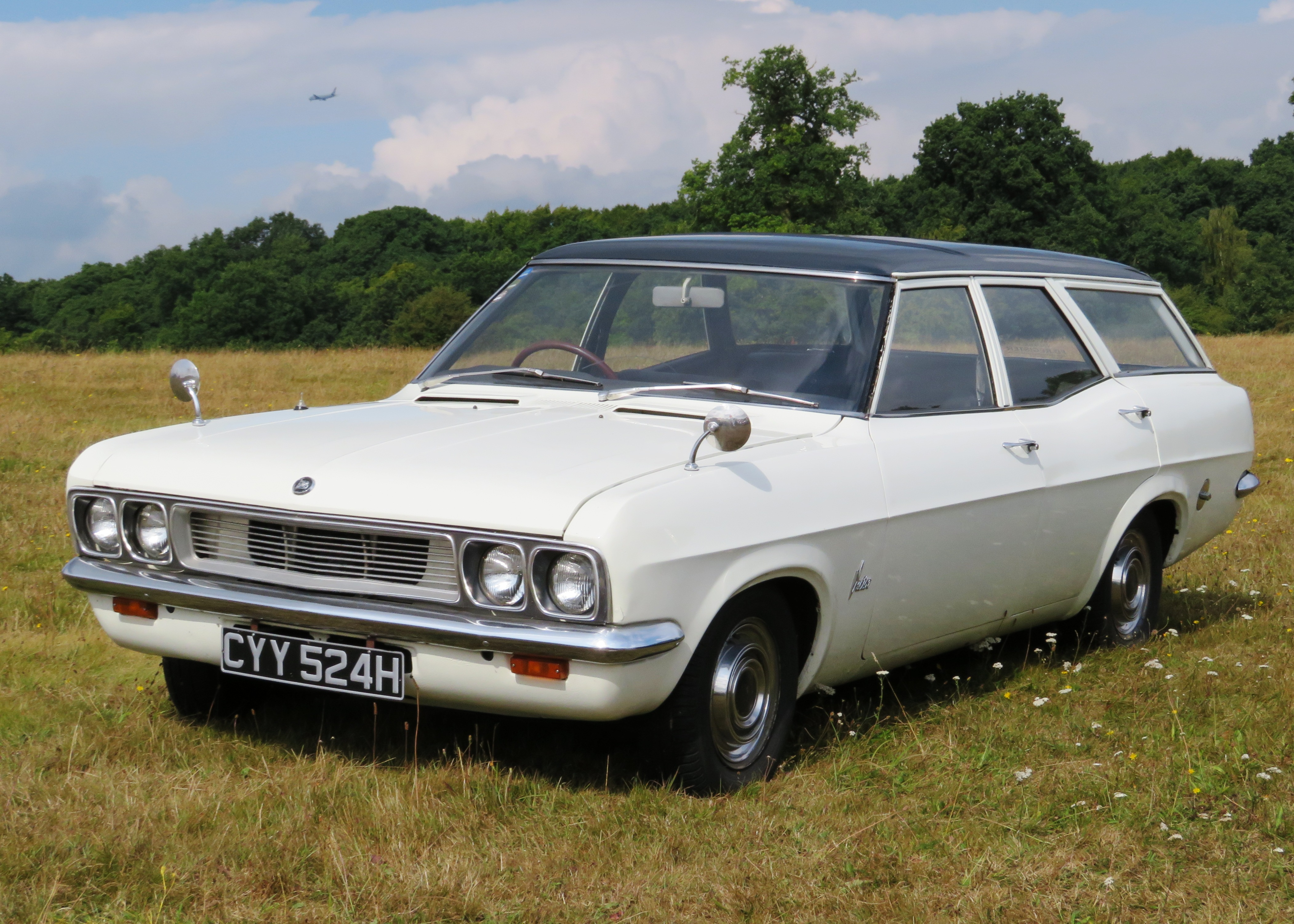
Vauxhall Victor FD Estate

In February 1968, Vauxhall launched the Vauxhall Ventora, which was in effect a marriage of the Victor FD body with the 3.3-litre six-cylinder engine hitherto offered only in the larger Cresta and Viscount models. The Ventora offered a claimed 123 bhp (92 kW; 125 PS) of output compared with 88 bhp (66 kW; 89 PS) from the 2-litre 4-cylinder Victor, also featuring correspondingly larger front disc-brake calipers. The Ventora therefore differed most spectacularly from its siblings through its effortless performance: in that respect it had no obvious direct competitor at or near its price (£1,102 including taxes in February 1968) on the UK market. The interior was also enhanced, with extra instrumentation including a rev counter. From the outside Ventoras can be identified by their wider tyres, a front grille of toothy-harmonica like gaps in place of the Victor's closely packed horizontal bars, fluted inserts in the hubcaps, and a black vinyl roof.

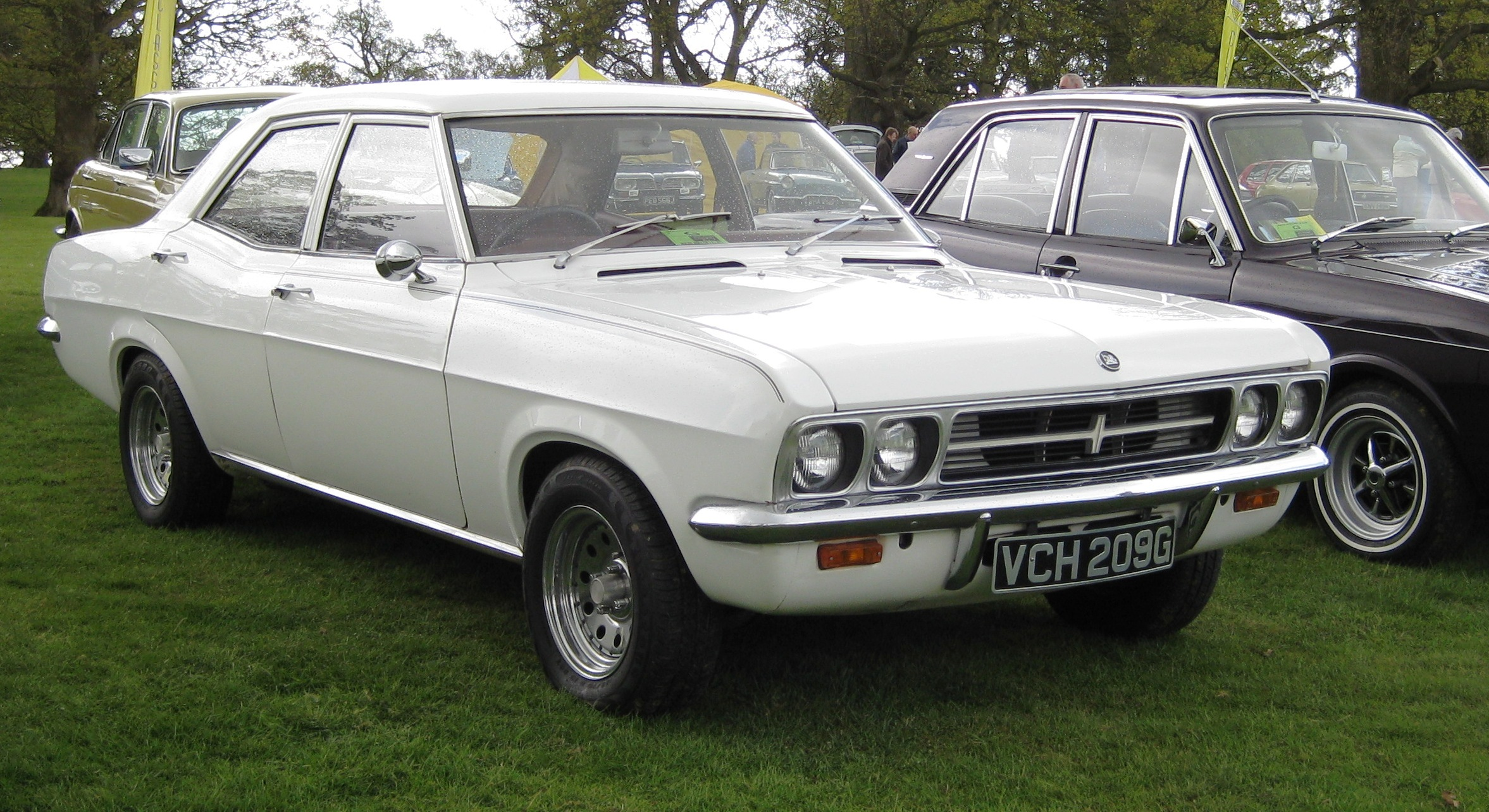
The VX 4/90 was a sporting derivative of the Victor, initially based on the Victor FB, but subsequently included in the FC, FD and FE Victor families.

May 1968 saw the return to the Vauxhall range of a Victor estate, now based on the Victor FD. The estate, like the saloon, offered a choice of 1599 cc or 1975 cc four-cylinder engines and was also offered with the 3294 cc engine normally found in the Vauxhall Cresta. (The Victor estate 3294 was the only six-cylinder Victor offered on the domestic market, although the Ventora was effectively a six-cylinder Victor saloon by another name.) Rear suspension was beefed up on the estate models and all apart from the base 1599 cc version came with front wheel disc brakes. As on the FD saloon, however, the standard transmission was a three-speed manual gearbox controlled from a column-mounted lever. A four-speed box with a floor-mounted gear lever was available at extra cost on the four-cylinder models, although it was included in the overall package for buyers of the Victor 3294 cc estate. The floor-mounted lever was set well forward to enable it to remain clear of the bench front seat which was standard in the 1599 cc versions.

Sales of the FD came in below those of the FC, at 198,000 or so units produced over a slightly longer production run that ended in December 1971, though new cars were offered for sale until the arrival of the Victor FE in March 1972. The lower numbers reflected the effects of a long strike Vauxhall underwent in 1970, as well as the closing off of some export markets — the FD was the last Victor to be sold in Canada as either a Vauxhall or Envoy, and the last to be officially imported (and assembled) into New Zealand.

As well as the 1.6 and 2.0 I4s, the FD series, the last Victor line to be sold there, was also available in New Zealand (sedans only; wagons were rare imports) with the larger Cresta PC's 3294 cc engine, badged as the Victor 3300, later 3300SL. These were manufactured with a choice of 4-speed manual gearbox or a 2-stage GM Powerglide automatic and most, apart from early cars, had the Ventora's grille. The new three speed GM Automatic (aka Holden Trimatic) gearbox was available for the update 1970 2.0 and 3.3 models. Bench (earlier 1.6 models with three-speed manual column shift only) or bucket front seats were available.

A one-off Ventora was the Black Prince. This high-profile modified car used components leftover after Gordon-Keeble went bust in the 1960s and was built in 1971, based on a modified Victor FD. The car featured a 5.4-litre V8 Chevrolet engine, ZF 5-speed gearbox and a limited-slip differential. Special features included a Sony 4-band radio that could be removed from the dashboard and used as a portable radio, auxiliary dials, Lucas Square 8 fog lights, matt black bonnet stripe, dash-mounted ice detector and map lights. The car was offered for sale in 1972 for approximately £3000, and was broken up in the late 1980s, with the owner using the running gear in a kit car. However, it is now known that one of the two cars built still exists in reasonable condition, but without the original engine/transmission, as it has been offered for sale in recent years. In reality, this car was merely a project to utilize the parts received from the administrators of the bankrupt Gordon-Keeble Car Co.

A 1972 Victor purchased at £60 and called Red Victor 2, has been heavily modified with around 2,000 hp to go 0-60mph in 1 second while still being street legal.

The earliest known surviving original FD series Victor 2000 is LRU 802F, a January 1968 registered car in Oyster Grey with a Casino Red interior. Known affectionately by The FD Register as 'Tom' after its first owner.

One earlier example in red survives which is extensively modified.

== FE Series Victor, VX4/90, Ventora, VX1800 and VX2300 ==
Vauxhall Victor FE Vauxhall VX4/90 FE Vauxhall Ventora FE Vauxhall VX1800 FE Vauxhall VX2300 FE
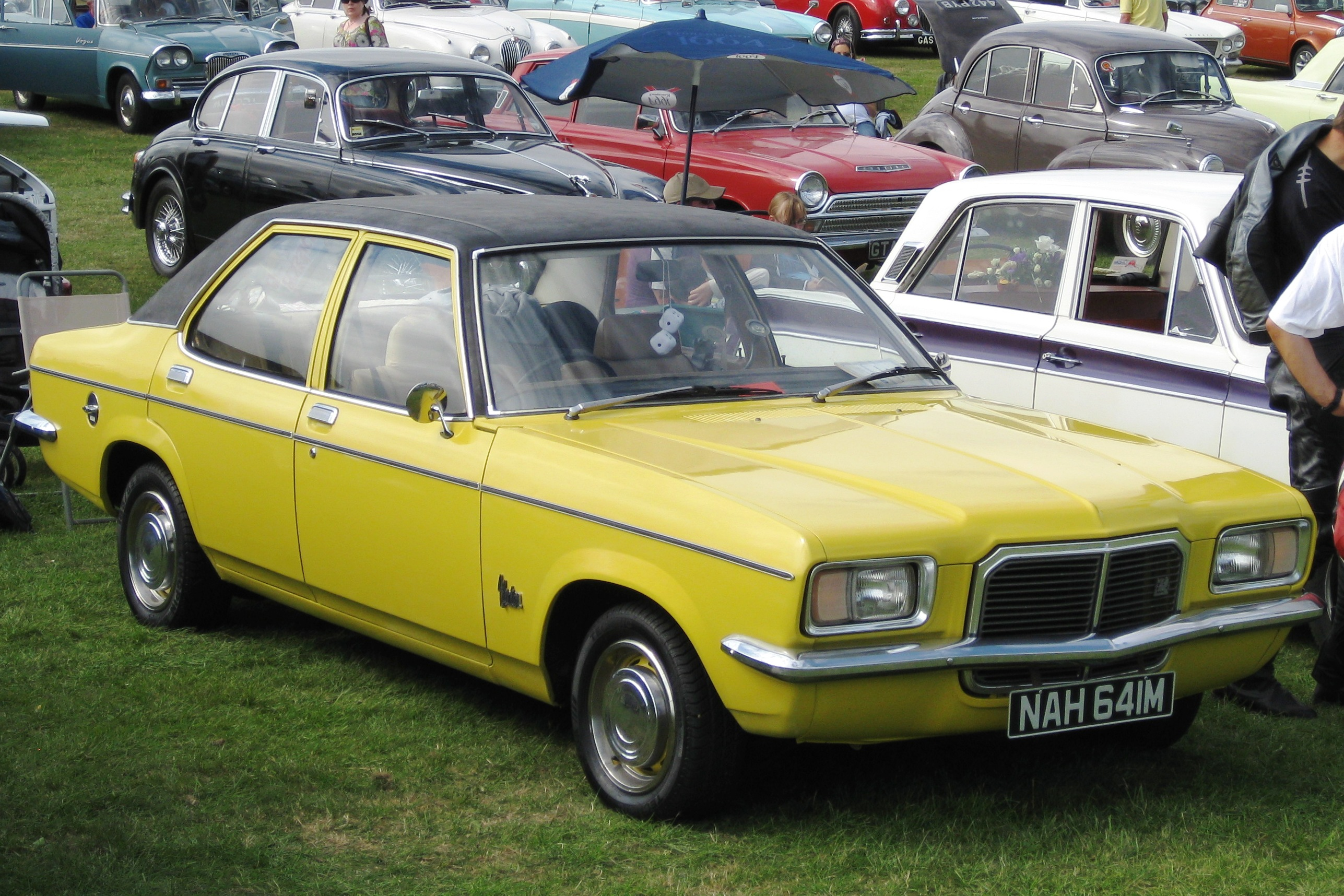

Overview
- Production: 1972–1978; Victor 1800/2300: 44,078 built VX4/90: 113,476 built (to 1976); Ventora: 7,291 built Victor 3300: 693 built VX1800/VX2300: 25,185 built

Body and chassis
- Body style: 4-door saloon 5-door estate
- Related: Opel Rekord; Hindustan Contessa

Powertrain
- Engine: 1759 cc OHC I4; 2279 cc OHC I4; 2793 cc OHV I6; 3294 cc OHV I6
- Transmission: 4-speed manual automatic

Dimensions
- Wheelbase: 105 in (2,667 mm)
- Length: 179 in (4,540 mm)
- Width: 67 in (1,700 mm)
- Height: 54 in (1,400 mm)

The last of the Victors, launched in March 1972, was the FE. Magazine and newspaper advertisements used the marketing slogan, "NEW VICTOR - The transcontinentals". The car appeared substantially larger than its predecessor, but was actually no wider and only 2 inches (5 cm) longer with much of the extra length accounted for by larger bumpers. Nevertheless, a higher cabin and improved packaging enabled the manufacturer to boast of 1.5 inches (38 mm) more leg room in the front and no less than 4 inches (100 mm) of extra leg room in the back, with virtually no loss of boot/trunk capacity. Useful increases in headroom and shoulder-level cabin width were also achieved through the use of differently shaped side panels and windows. The Victor Deluxes originally had a bench seat in front; this was replaced with bucket seats for 1973 and the parking brake was moved to its conventional position on the floor between them.

Most UK cars in this class featured manual transmission and with the FE Vauxhall belatedly fell into line with their principal UK competitor by including a four-speed gearbox – available only at extra cost on the old Victor FD – as standard equipment. The FE's extra weight presumably made this development irresistible. The four-speed transmission used the same box and ratios across the range, from the 1759 cc Victor to the torquey 3294 cc Ventora-badged version: contemporary road tests of the four-cylinder cars comment adversely on the wide gap – highlighted on the mountain roads included in the Portuguese route chosen for the car's press launch – between second and third gears.

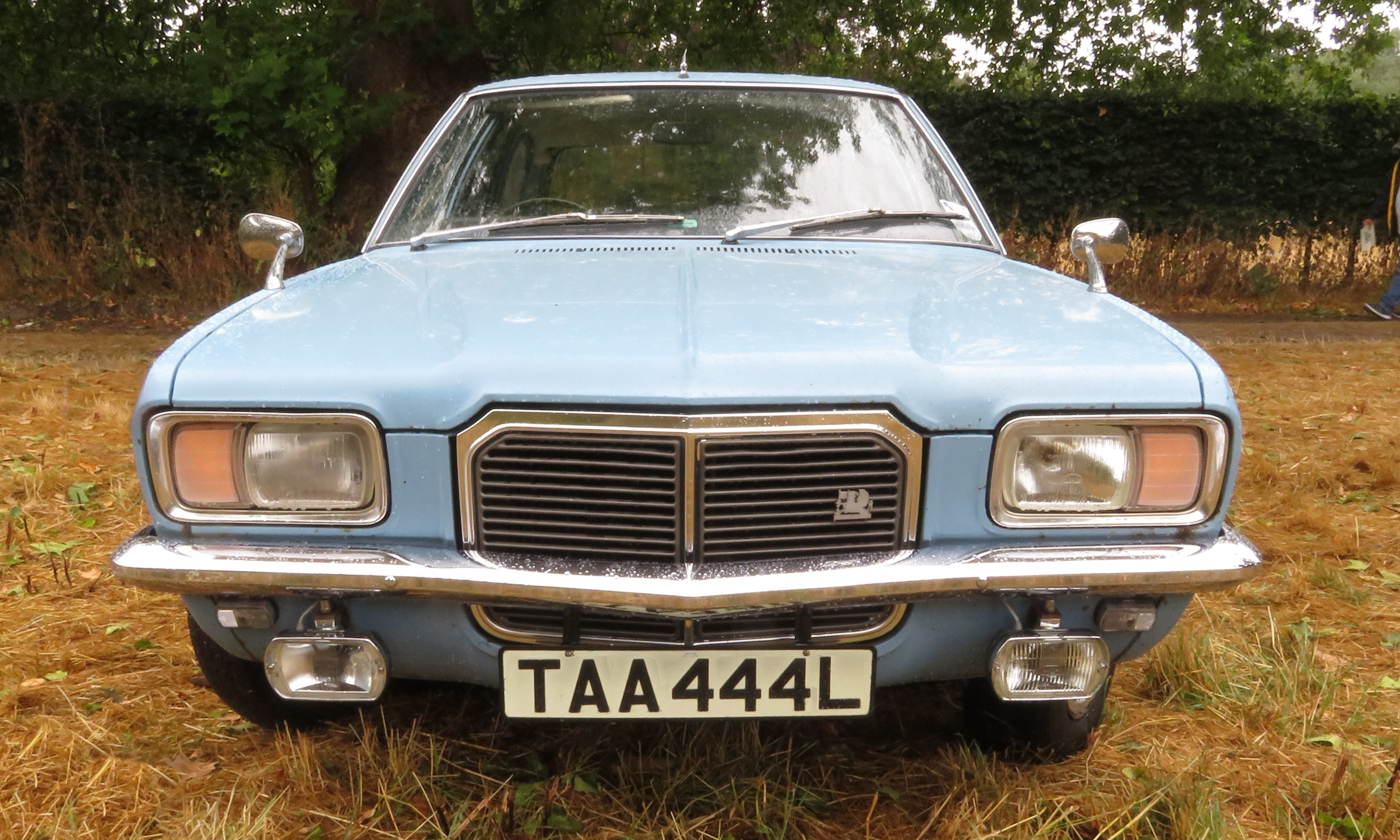
1972 Victor FE

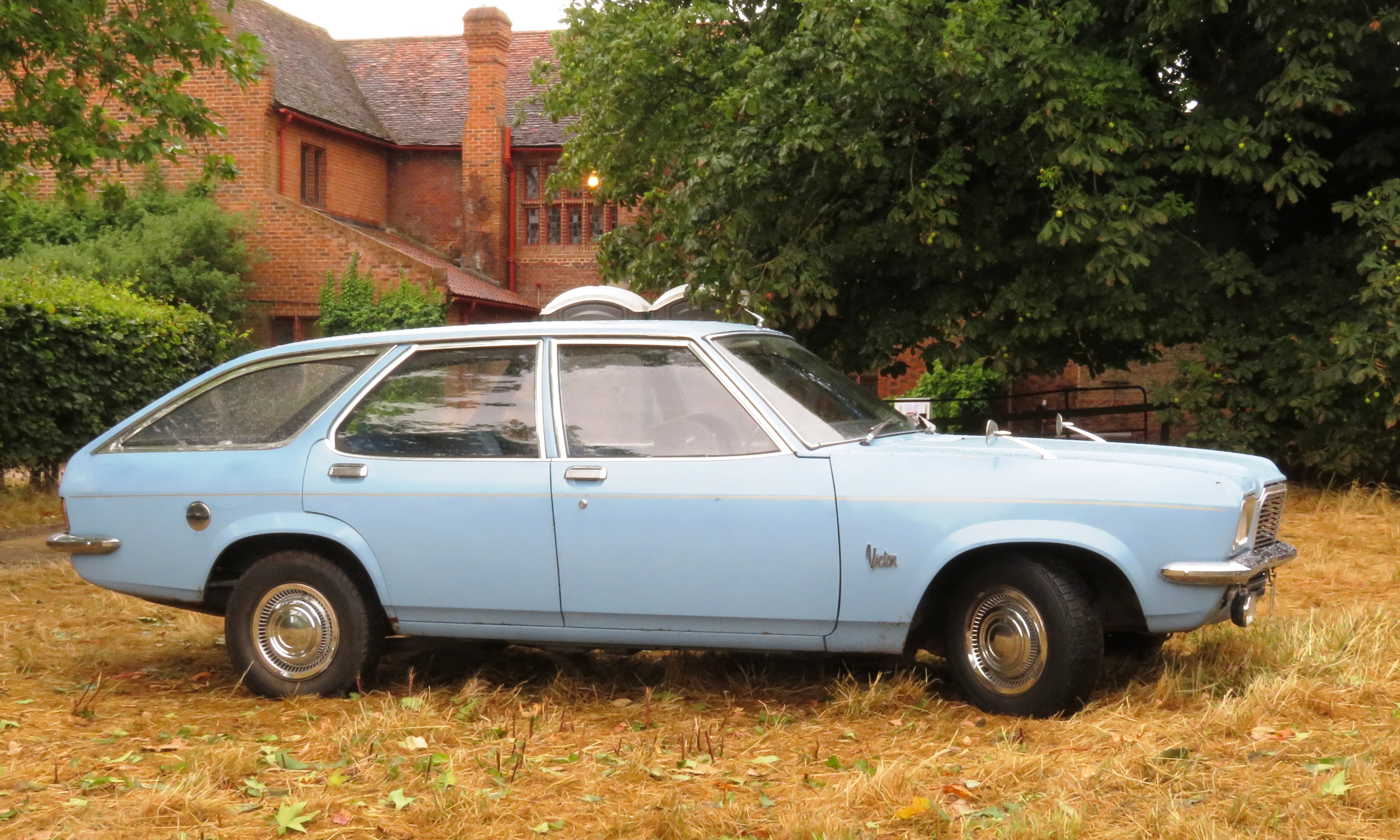
1972 Victor FE estate

Although the architecture of the suspension remained as before, numerous detailed modifications were made to counter criticism of the old model. Changes included an anti-roll bar as standard equipment on all but the entry-level models, and stiffer springs at the back, intended to compensate for the Victor's tendency to understeer. At the front the springing remained soft by the standards of the time: the track was widened (by 1.7 inches / 4 cm) and wheel geometry modified to incorporate "anti-dive action", improvements intended to address the Victor's tendency to wallow, which by then was attracting criticism from performance-oriented commentators.

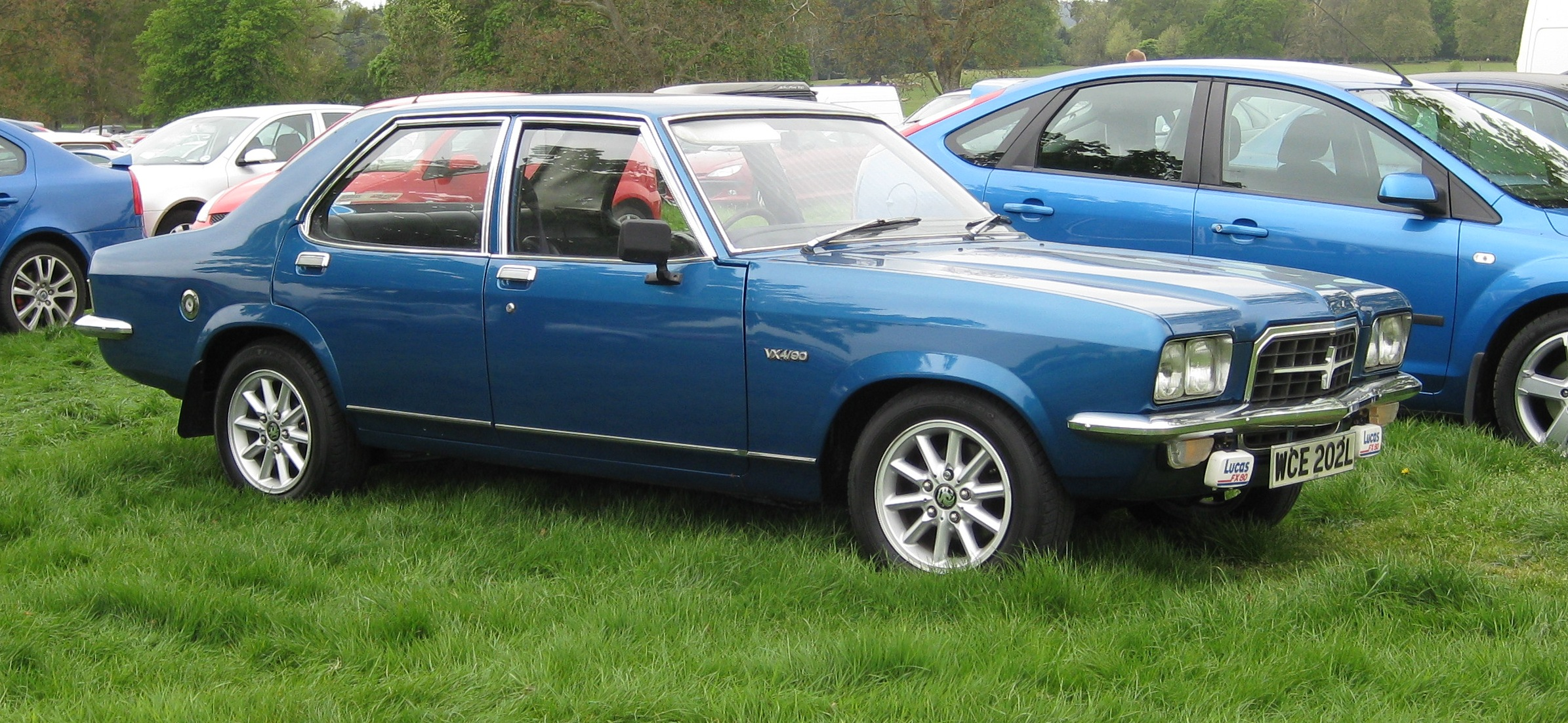
1972 Vauxhall VX4/90 (FE)

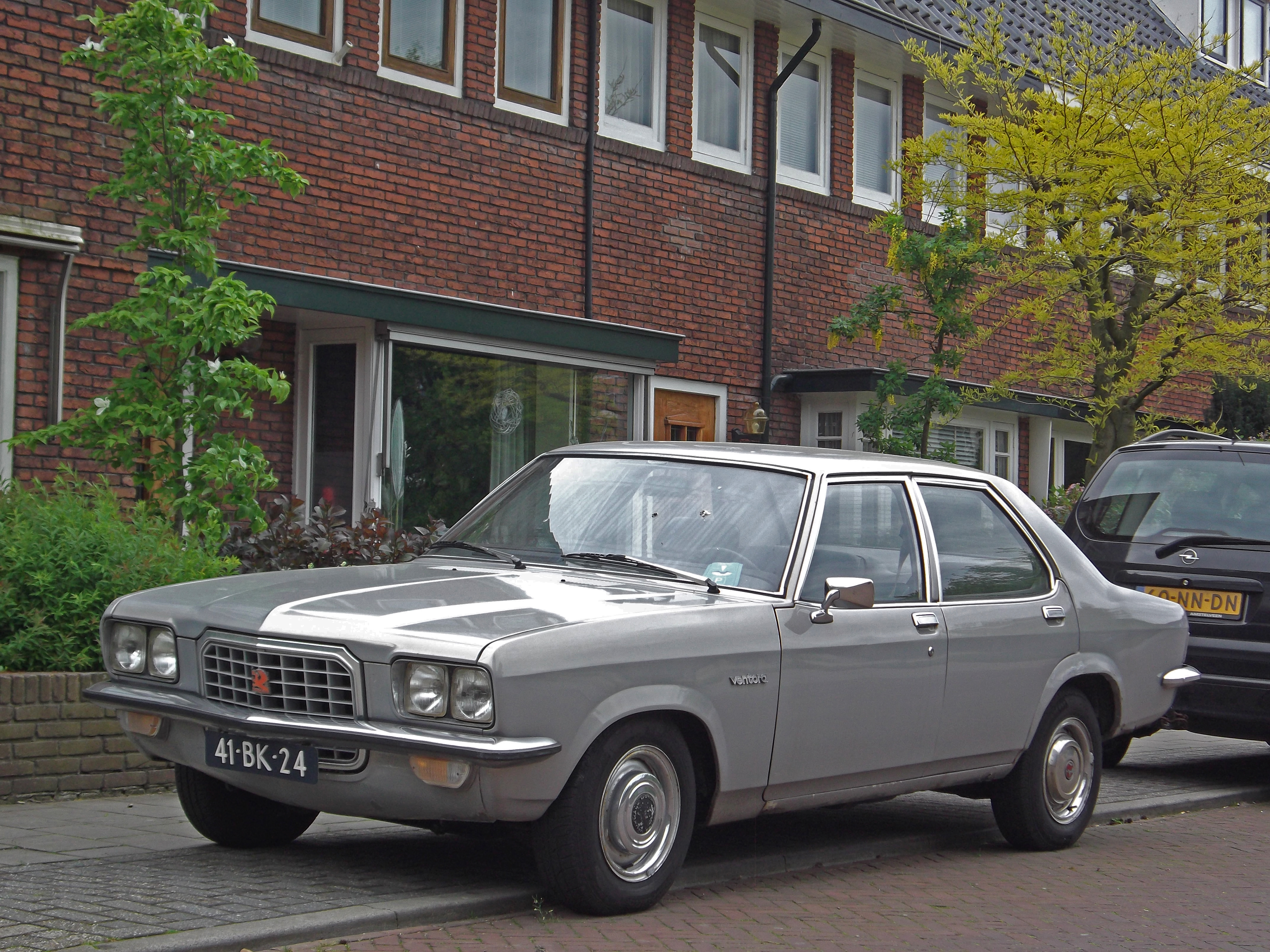
Vauxhall Ventora Saloon (FE)

The new Victor shared its floorpan and its basic bodyshell architecture with the Opel Rekord D (therefore the two cars look superficially similar) but all of the exterior panels were unique to the Victor and thus not interchangeable with the Rekord. The car used Vauxhall powertrains, along its own suspension and rack-and-pinion steering as opposed to the Rekord's recirculating ball unit. The front end incorporated the then advanced detail of having the slim bumper bisect the grille, with a third of the grille and the side-lights (on quad headlamp models) below the bumper line. Also, the estate version of the Victor took a completely different form to the equivalent 'Caravan' version of the Rekord.

Comparisons between the Victor and the Opel Rekord D were inevitable. An important difference from the back seat involved the rear doors. The Opel's door incorporated rear quarter lights and windows that wound fully down into the door whereas Vauxhall's designers preferred the "cleaner uncluttered look" arising from their elimination of rear quarter lights. The fact that back seat passengers could only open their windows down to approximately a third of their depth before further opening was blocked by the presence of the wheel arches was held out as a safety feature to complement the fitting of child-proof locks, given that back-seat passengers would no doubt include small children. Despite the absence of shared body panels anywhere that they could be seen, detailed investigation disclosed that minor assemblies such as the door locks and the wiper mechanisms were shared with the Opel Rekord D.

The FE Victor was the last Vauxhall to be designed independently of Opel. The engines were carried over from the FD range although enlarged to 1759 cc and 2279 cc. For a short period, the straight-six engine was used in the Ventora and 3300 SL models, the latter effectively a Victor Estate with lesser trim than the luxury Ventora. In spite of the heavy engine the 3300 SL Estate did not originally have power steering, this only arrived for the 1973 model year. The estates had a more sloping rear, similar to a hatchback, than the Rekord equivalent. The four-cylinder FE estate in fact had perfect 50/50 weight distribution. For the 1974 model year, the Victor underwent a light facelift with some interior modifications as well.

1974 finally saw the introduction of a proper Ventora Estate, along with running changes for the rest of the range. For some markets there was also a smaller 2.8-litre version of the big six available in the Ventora and Victor 3300 SL Estate; with more weight and less power than the four-cylinder, as well as higher fuel consumption, the extra cost was hard to justify and it soon disappeared from price lists along with the Ventora 3.3-litre.

World energy crises, falling exports and an increasingly muddled image led to Vauxhall's decline during the early 1970s, such that sales of the FE slumped to 55,000 units before it was transformed to the VX series in January 1976.

=== VX Series ===
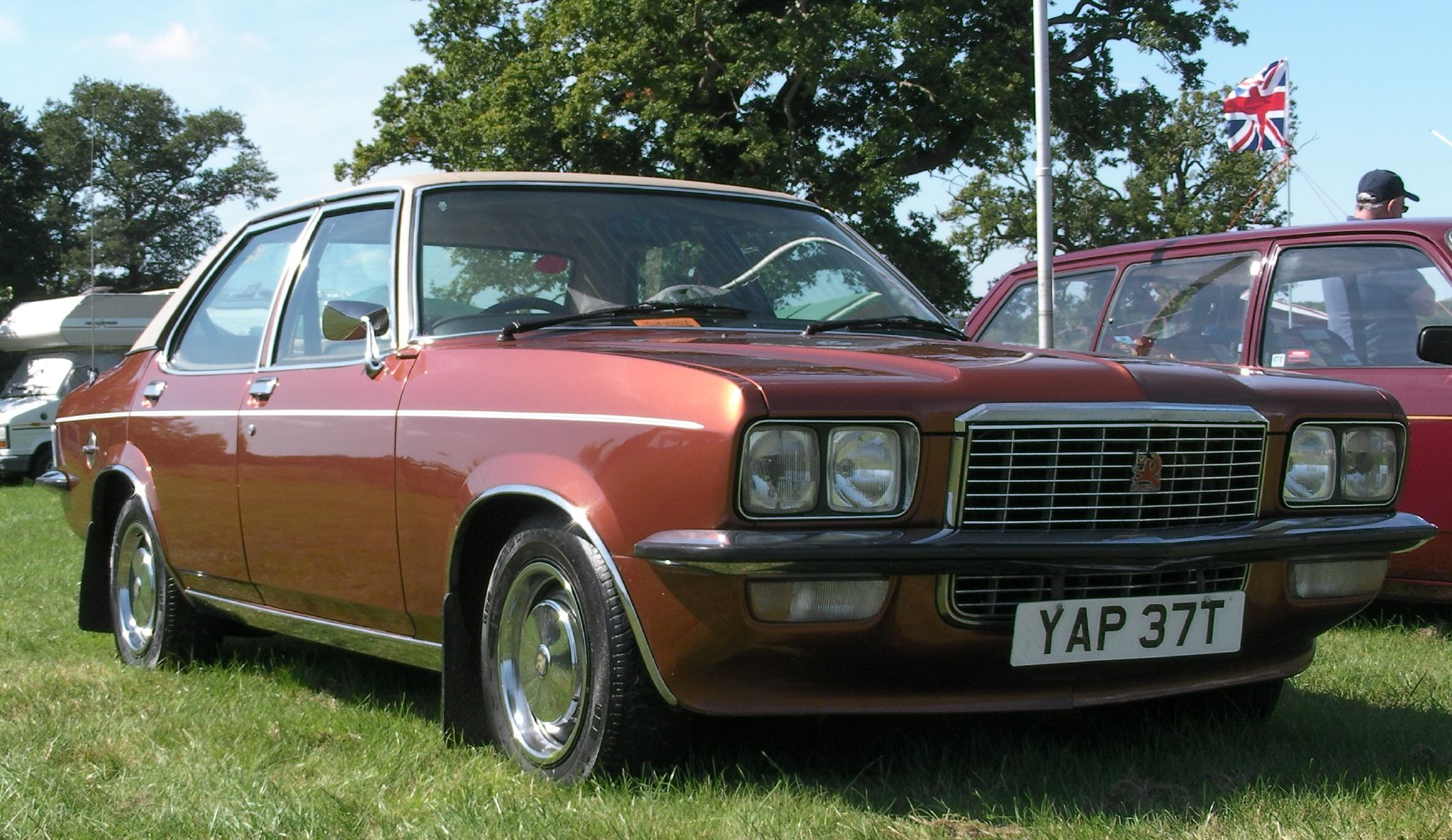
A late Vauxhall VX2300 GLS

At the start of 1976 the relatively large 1800 cc Vauxhall Victor came with a recommended sticker price lower than that of the more modern but smaller and relatively well equipped Vauxhall Cavalier GL, which will have encouraged fleet managers to negotiate for higher discounts on the Cavalier and left the basic Victor looking embarrassingly underpriced. To try to move the Victor upmarket, Vauxhall upgraded the trim level of the basic Victor 1800 cc to match that of the 2300 cc version, with improvements that included fabric seat trim, a new clarified instrument display embellished with mock timber surround as well as a new central console. and a seat belt warning light across the range. Under the bonnet / hood various upgrades were made to the 1800 cc engine which now offered 88 bhp (66 kW; 89 PS) of output in place of the 77 bhp (57 kW; 78 PS) previously claimed. The changes carried a weight penalty, but performance was nevertheless usefully improved with top speed up from 89 mph (143 km/h) to 100 mph (161 km/h). To draw attention to the changes Vauxhall also dropped the Victor and VX 4/90 model names and the range was renamed the Vauxhall VX in January 1976. The VX Series is distinguished from the outside by a simplified grille and revised headlights.

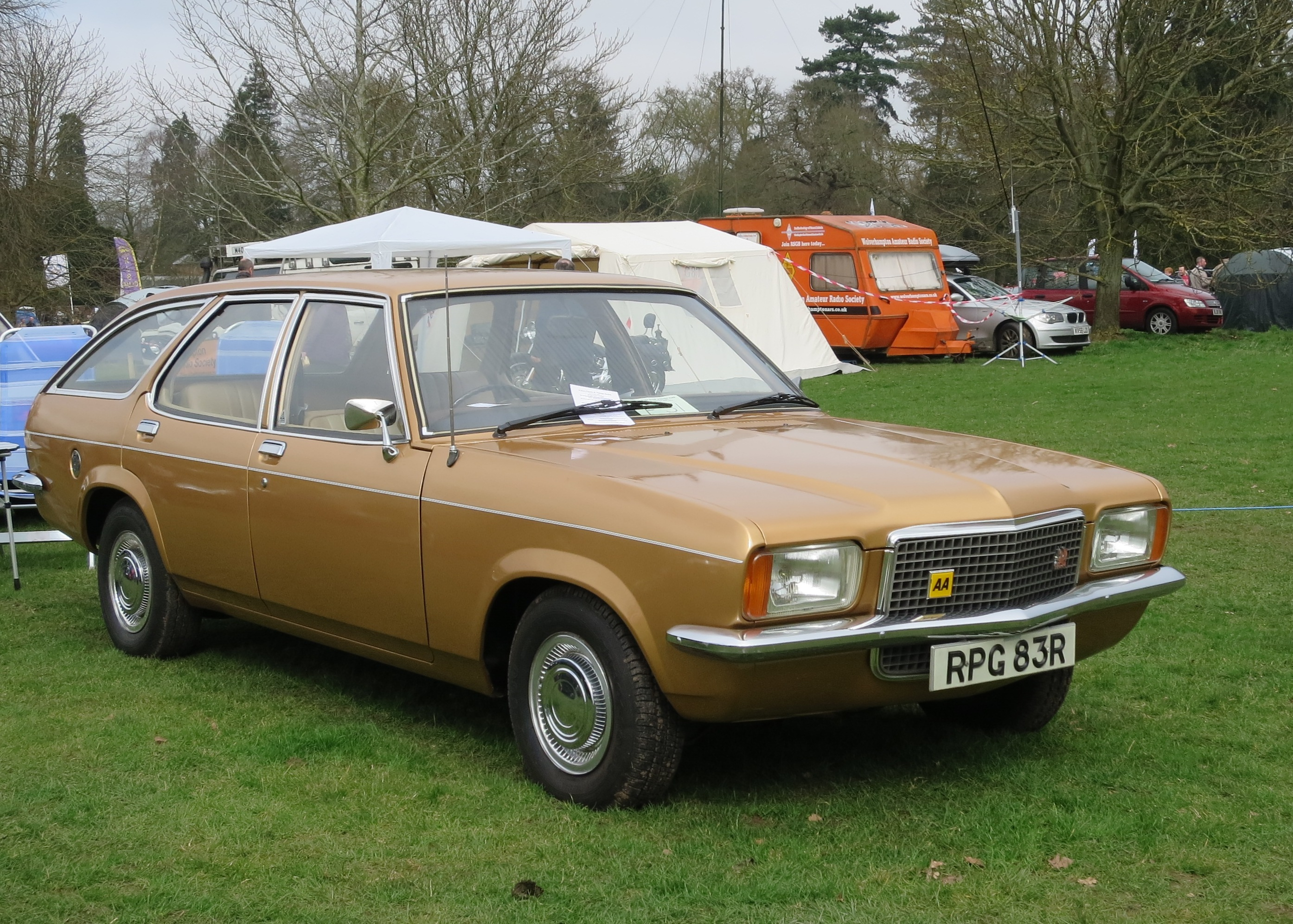
Vauxhall VX1800 Estate

Since the demise of the Vauxhall Cresta more than three years earlier, only the Ventora had used the old Vauxhall six-cylinder engine: but now the four-cylinder VX 2300 GLS replaced the six-cylinder FE Ventora as Vauxhall's flagship. The VX2300 GLS was fitted with four square halogen headlamps, velour upholstery, tinted glass and power steering.

The more sporting VX 4/90 was reintroduced, now based on the VX (formerly Victor FE), in March 1977 with a 5-speed close-ratio Getrag gearbox with dog-leg first gear (also featured in the VX 2300 GLS model), initially for mainland European export markets only. The car featured a modified, twin-carburettor version of the existing 2279 cc four-cylinder engine for which an output of 116 bhp (87 kW; 118 PS) was claimed, up from 108 hp (81 kW; 109 PS) in the VX 2300, and a prototype fuel-injected variant was tested but not put into production. The car was fitted with twin halogen headlights and supplementary front fog-lights fitted beneath the front bumper, and also benefitted from extra sound-deadening materials to reduce road noise. The side window frames were fashionably blackened, and only four exterior colours could be specified, of which three were metallic. The manufacturer stated that the UK market would receive right-hand-drive versions of this latest incarnation of the VX 4/90 only in 1978. In 1978 the Vauxhall Carlton was released as a direct replacement for the VX1800/2300, production of which ended in the same year. The Carlton was based on the corresponding Opel Rekord E, and unlike the Victor FE/VX, was much closer in its engineering and body structure to its Opel sister - continuing the process of "Opelisation" of the Vauxhall range that had begun some years earlier.

== Product variants ==
The VX four-ninety was announced as a performance oriented version of the FB Victor in October 1961. During the FB series, the name changed slightly to VX 4/90 which continued to be used until the end of the FE range although the final VX 1978 incarnation carried badges which read VX490. The VX Four Ninety designation originally came from its engineering designation - Vauxhall eXperimental four-cylinder engine of 90 in³ capacity. As well as performance increasing modifications, VX 4/90s also had a number of exterior and interior modifications to distinguish them from Victors.

The Ventora, was introduced to the FD series sold between 1968 until it was dropped from the FE series in 1976. This used the Victor bodyshell, but had the Bedford-derived 3294 cc straight-six engine from the larger Cresta models. Again, the Ventora was distinguished from the Victor by improved trim levels and a more regal grille. The Ventora was effectively replaced as Vauxhall's flagship executive saloon by the Opel-designed Senator/Royale model in 1978.

== Victor specials ==
=== Big Bertha ===
A special version of the FE was the one-off 1974 Repco Holden-engined Ventora, nicknamed "Big Bertha", built to compete in the "Super Saloon" category of British motor sport. Driven by Gerry Marshall, this car was fitted with a race-tuned 5.0 L V8 Repco Holden engine and bore little resemblance to the production car, except in its overall appearance. However the design was ill-fated, and suffered a crash in its sixth race. It was considered too big and too heavy, and had handling problems. Eventually it was decided to build a new, much smaller car around the same engine and chassis (much shortened) and this car was given the silhouette of the "droopsnoot" Firenza. Nicknamed "Baby Bertha", this car was more successful and went on to dominate the category until Vauxhall moved from racing into rallying in 1977.
