= Red Victor 3 =

Street legal racing car

Red Victor 3 is the latest in a line of street legal cars named 'Red Victor' and is the brainchild of British mechanic Andy Frost (Autosports), creator and builder of Red Victor 1 and Red Victor 2. Built in conjunction with Wayne Allman, Jon Webster and Dale Edmonds and Darryn Coleman, the work on the car took three years, and it was completed in June 2012. It completed the Santa Pod Raceway quarter mile track in 6.40s at 225 mph in 2013 and 6.59 seconds at 220 mph in 2012.

== Statistics ==
=== Engine ===
Specifications
Specification	Details
Engine	539 cu in (8,830 cc) Chevrolet V8
Block	New Century ZL1 aluminium water block built by Marc Lamude of Lamude Racing Engines.
Heads	Billet aluminium GM Chevrolet c/w Victory Performance titanium intake and titanium exhaust valves, Victory titanium retainers and locks. New Century fasteners, Cometic head gaskets. Fabricated Moroso rocker covers.
Valvetrain	T+ D shaft rockers, PAC valve springs, Manton 1/2”/7/16" pushrods
Induction	Twin Precision Turbo Gen 2 102 mm (4.0 in) Pro Mod turbos custom built for RV3, custom Pro Alloy motorsport intake pipes, Wilson manifolds billet elbow and twin Wilson 105 mm (4.1 in) throttle bodies and twin Turbosmart Raceport blow-off valves.
Exhaust	Custom 321 stainless steel 2¼-inch diameter manifolds and 4.5-inch diameter silencers, all Zircotec ceramic coated. 2 × Turbosmart 60 mm (2.4 in) wastegates
Crank	Winberg billet steel
Cam and drive	Bullet 55 mm (2.2 in) solid roller, Jesel .937-inch dog bone roller lifters, New Century gear drive.
Connecting rods	GRP billet aluminium c/w ARP 2000 bolts
Pistons	Diamond Pistons custom c/w hard coat anodised and Teflon skirt coating, Trend casidium coated pins. Total Seal piston rings.
Fuel system	Waterman 25 GPM belt driven fuel pump, Bosch 044 primer pump, Aeromotive regulator, 8 Seimens 220 injectors, and 8 Billet Atomizer 700 lb injectors, Twin Motec M800 ECU's with custom KA sensors, 10 gallon custom fuel tank, System 1 primary fuel filter into twin Protec filters, Goodridge lightweight G-line fuel transfer hose.
Fuel	Renegade Racing Fuels Pro Methanol. Renegade Pro 112+ or Shell V power for street.
Oil system	4 stage reverse cam driven Aviaid dry sump system, Turbowerx turbo scavenge pump, Peterson 1.5 gallon oil tank, System 1 oil filter, Goodridge lightweight G-line oil transfer hose.
Ignition	Pantera EFI individual coils run by twin Motec M800 ECUs, Motec PDM and E888, Magnecor R100 10mm spark plug leads, NGK racing spark plugs Tuned by Shane Tecklenburg

=== Miscellaneous ===
Car: 1972 Vauxhall VX4/90 FD VXR spec. Custom body from a standard Vauxhall Victor cut and shaped by Intergalactic Custom shop, and a mould taken and done by DRE Fibreglass. Painted by DC Customs.

=== Figures and Records ===
- Able to drive on the street and race in the FIA/MSA/NHRA Pro Modified class.

Worlds fastest street legal car as of November 2019. 5.87 @ 263.74 mph (424.45 km/h) in the 1/4 mile (0.40 km).
