= Hindustan Ambassador =

Subcompact car produced by Hindustan Motors (1957–2014)

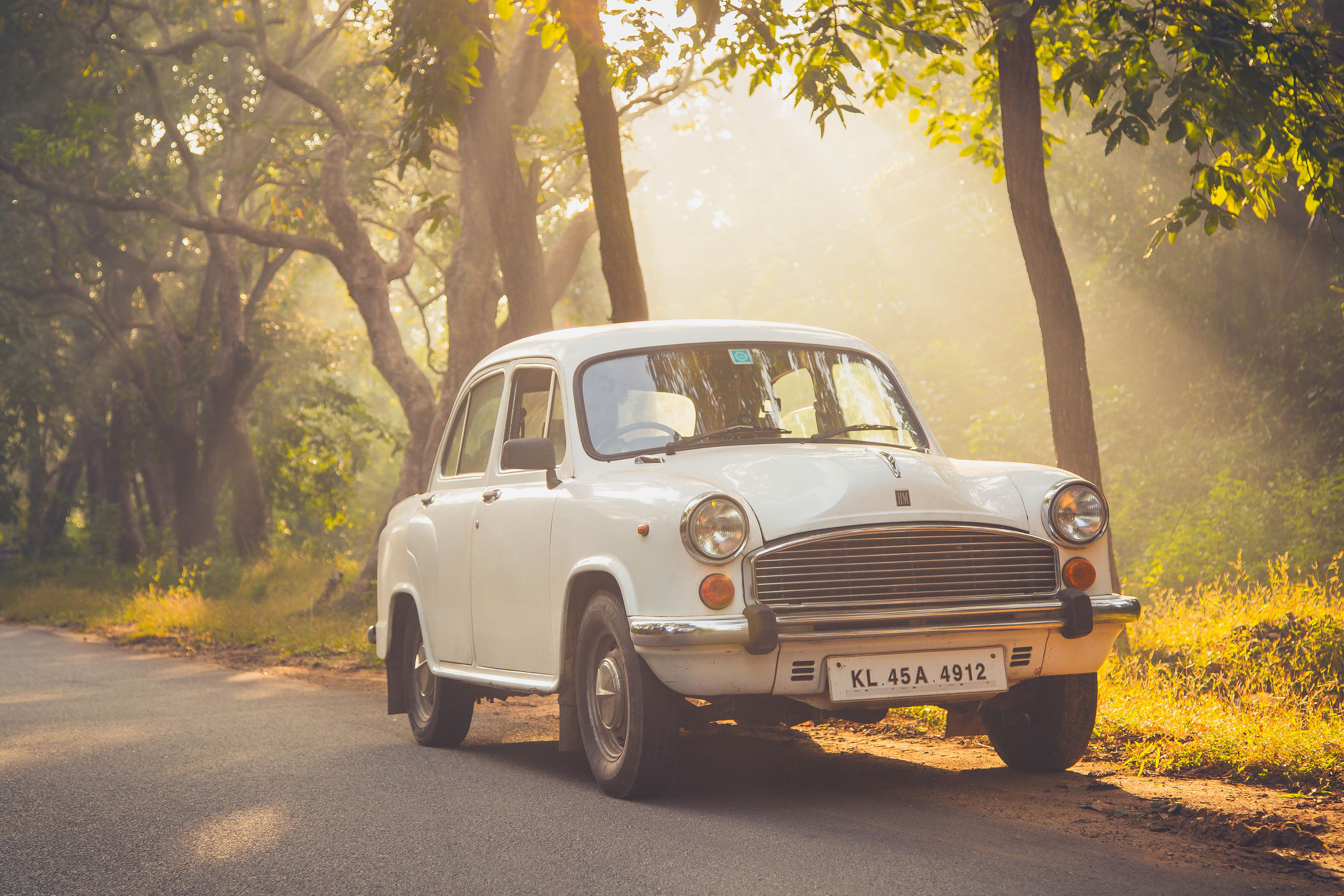
- Ambassador Classic

Overview
- Manufacturer: Hindustan Motors
- Production: 1957–2014
- Assembly: India: Hooghly, West Bengal; India: Tiruvallur, Tamil Nadu

Body and chassis
- Class: Mid-size car (E)
- Body style: 4-door saloon
- Layout: FR layout
- Related: Morris Oxford Series III

Powertrain
- Transmission: 4-speed manual

Chronology
- Predecessor: Hindustan Landmaster; Hindustan Deluxe
- Successor: Hindustan Contessa

The Hindustan Ambassador is an automobile manufactured by Indian manufacturer Hindustan Motors from 1957 to 2014. It was based on the Morris Oxford Series III by Morris Motors.

On 11 February 2017, Hindustan Motors executed an agreement with Groupe PSA for the sale of the Ambassador brand, including the trademarks, for a consideration of ₹80 crore (US$8.3 million). The tie-up entailed two joint-venture agreements between the companies of the two groups.

== History ==
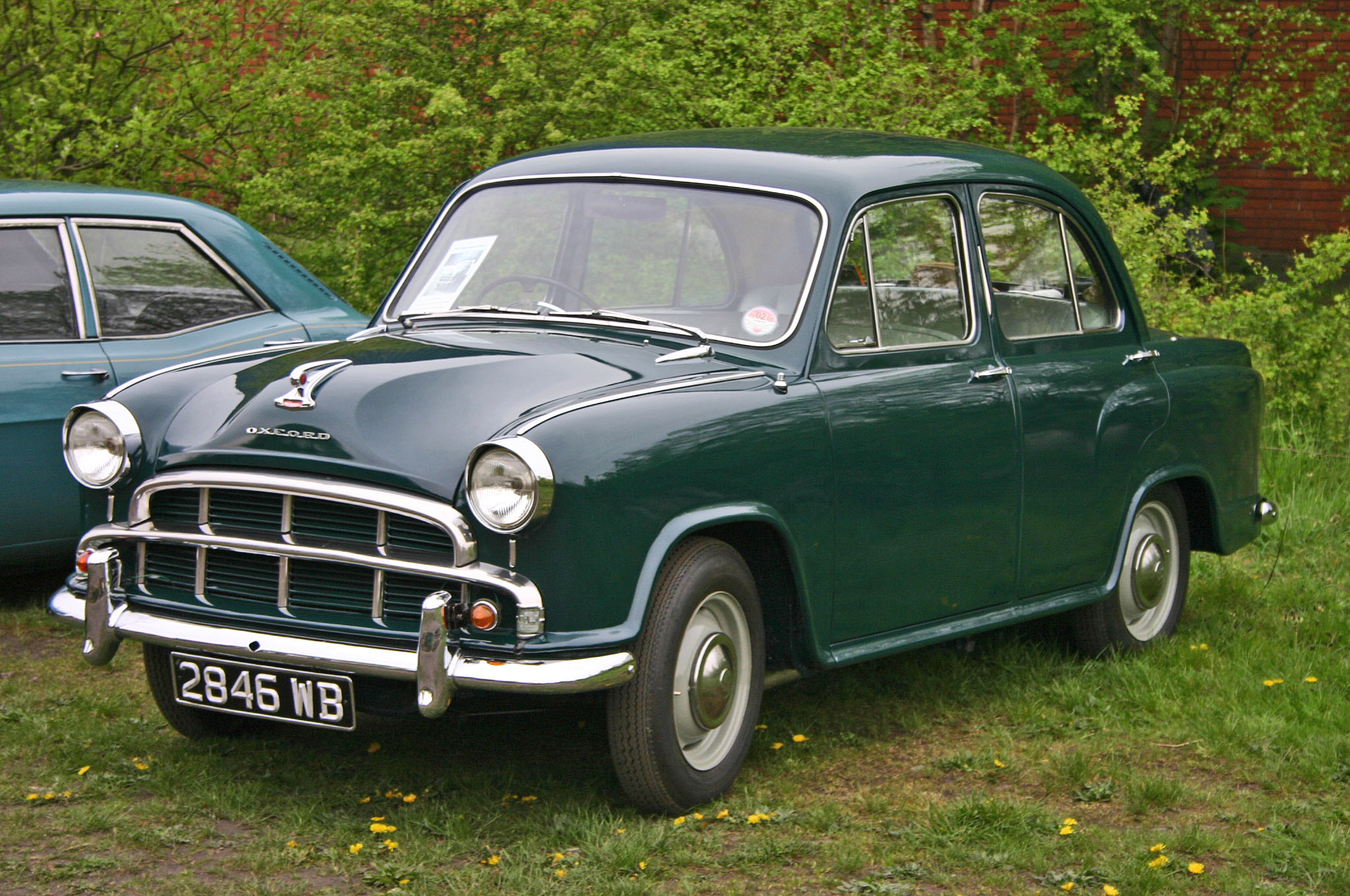
1955 Morris Oxford Series III was launched in India in 1957 as Ambassador Mark I

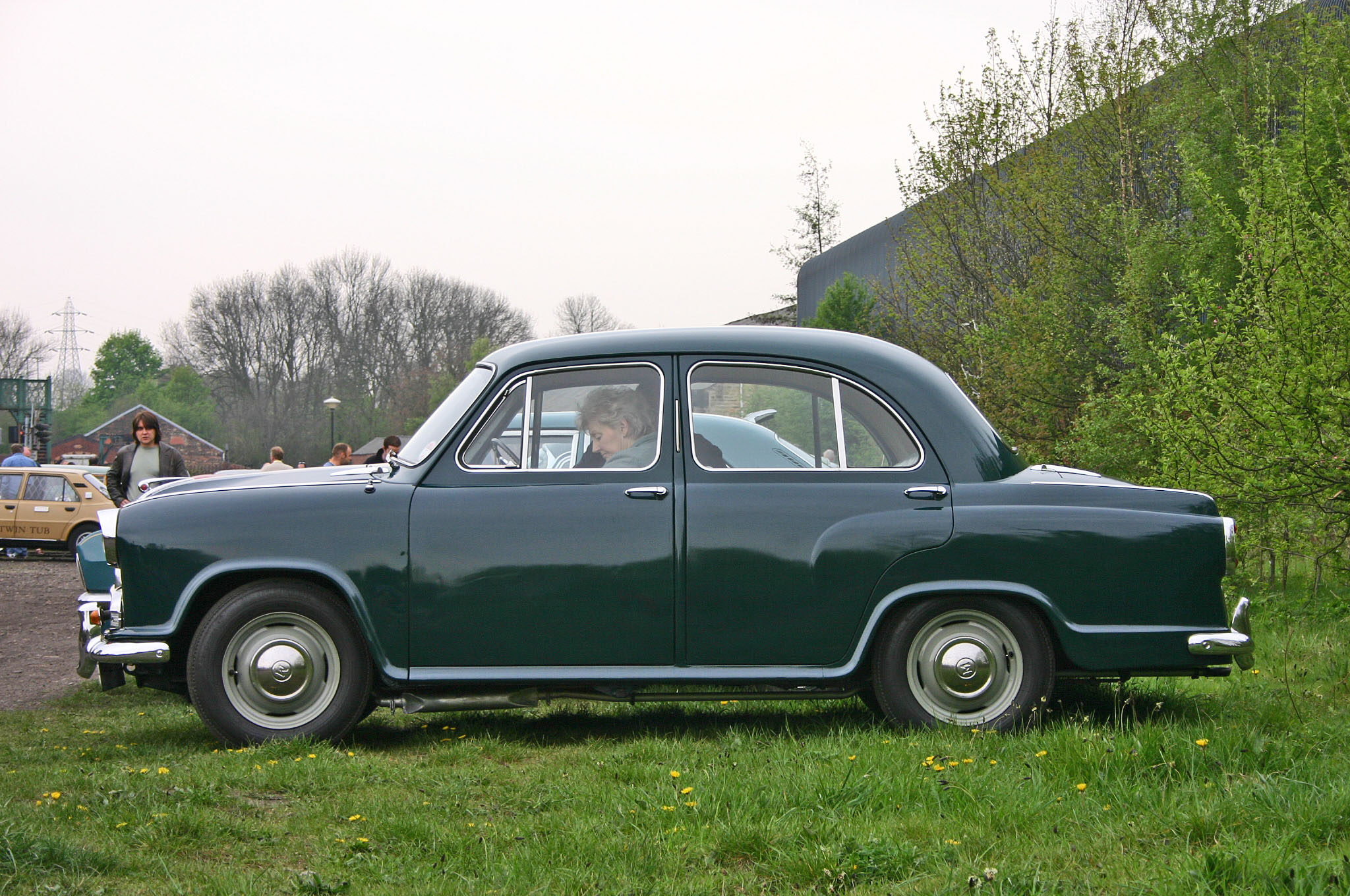
Side view of 1956 Morris Oxford Series III that remains unchanged till date except for frontal grille changes

=== Design and development ===
In 1956 Morris Motors (then a part of British Motor Corporation) sold the rights and tooling of the Morris Oxford Series III to Hindustan Motors, as it had done for its previous Series I and Series II models which were sold by Hindustan Motors as Hindustan 14 and Landmaster. The Series III model itself was a derivative of the Morris Oxford Series II model which was developed prior to the Austin and Morris merger.

The Ambassador replaced the Morris Oxford Series II based Hindustan Landmaster, which was quite similar, and the larger Hindustan Deluxe based on the Chevrolet Deluxe.

=== Birla Group ===
Hindustan Motors Limited (HM), part of the Birla group was India's pioneering car manufacturing company and later a flagship company of the C.K. Birla Group. The company was established just before Indian independence, in 1942 by B.M. Birla. They began operations in a small assembly plant in Port Okha near Gujarat by assembling the then Morris 10 as the Hindustan 10.

In the mid-1950s, they planned to upgrade their existing Hindustan models based on the Morris Oxford Series II (Hindustan Landmaster), and eventually acquired rights for the new Morris Oxford Series III. The car initially came with a side-valve engine but was later improved with an overhead-valve engine. The Ambassador was quite innovative, with a fully enclosed monocoque chassis, making it spacious inside.

The Morris MO Series models were introduced by 1949 as the Hindustan 14, with production continuing until 1954. The Landmaster based on the Morris Oxford Series II was introduced, with the same 1476 cc side valve engine, drawn from the earlier Hindustan I4. The same engine was used for the older Ambassadors Mark I from 1958 to 1960.

=== Production years ===
The political influence of the Birla family helped ensure that the Ambassador was one of the few cars that were in production following the 1954 government policy of promoting an indigenous Automobile industry. It dominated the market for several decades, mostly due to its spacious size and ruggedness compared to its rivals like the Premier Padmini and Standard 10. By the early 1980s, the comparatively expensive Ambassador's low fuel economy and poor quality began to hinder sales. It still represented more than two thirds of Indian car production, but wait lists were still at 12 months, while the Premier Padmini had a wait list nearly five years long. The Ambassador remained dominant in the official and company sectors, while also popular as a taxi, but private motorists gradually abandoned the "Amby" in the 1980s and 1990s.

Production of Hindustan Ambassador at its plants outside the cities of Kolkata and Chennai ended owing to weak demand and financing problems. Prior to the cancellation, the company had sold 2,200 Ambassadors in the financial year which ended in March 2014, only a tenth of the sales of the Ambassador reached in the mid-eighties.

In 2022, HM confirmed that the company was working with the French Auto maker Peugeot to bring back Ambassador in its new design whose work was already in advanced stages. Earlier in 2017 Hindustan Motors had sold the Ambassador brand to the French auto manufacturer Peugeot for Rs 80 crore.

=== Export to the United Kingdom ===
The Ambassador was briefly sold in the United Kingdom in 1992, imported as the Fullbore Mark 10. The cars were retrofitted with a heater and seat belts in order to comply with European safety legislation, but only a tiny number were ever sold and the importer went into liquidation.

=== Reintroduction ===
On 28 May 2022 Hindustan reported that the Ambassador nameplate will be reintroduced with a new engine and design. It was also reported that the design process for the revived Ambassador's new engine was already in an advanced stage of development, and that the new models would be produced at Hindustan's production line in Chennai.

== Evolution ==
The Ambassador remained in continuous production from its inception, with very few improvements or changes.

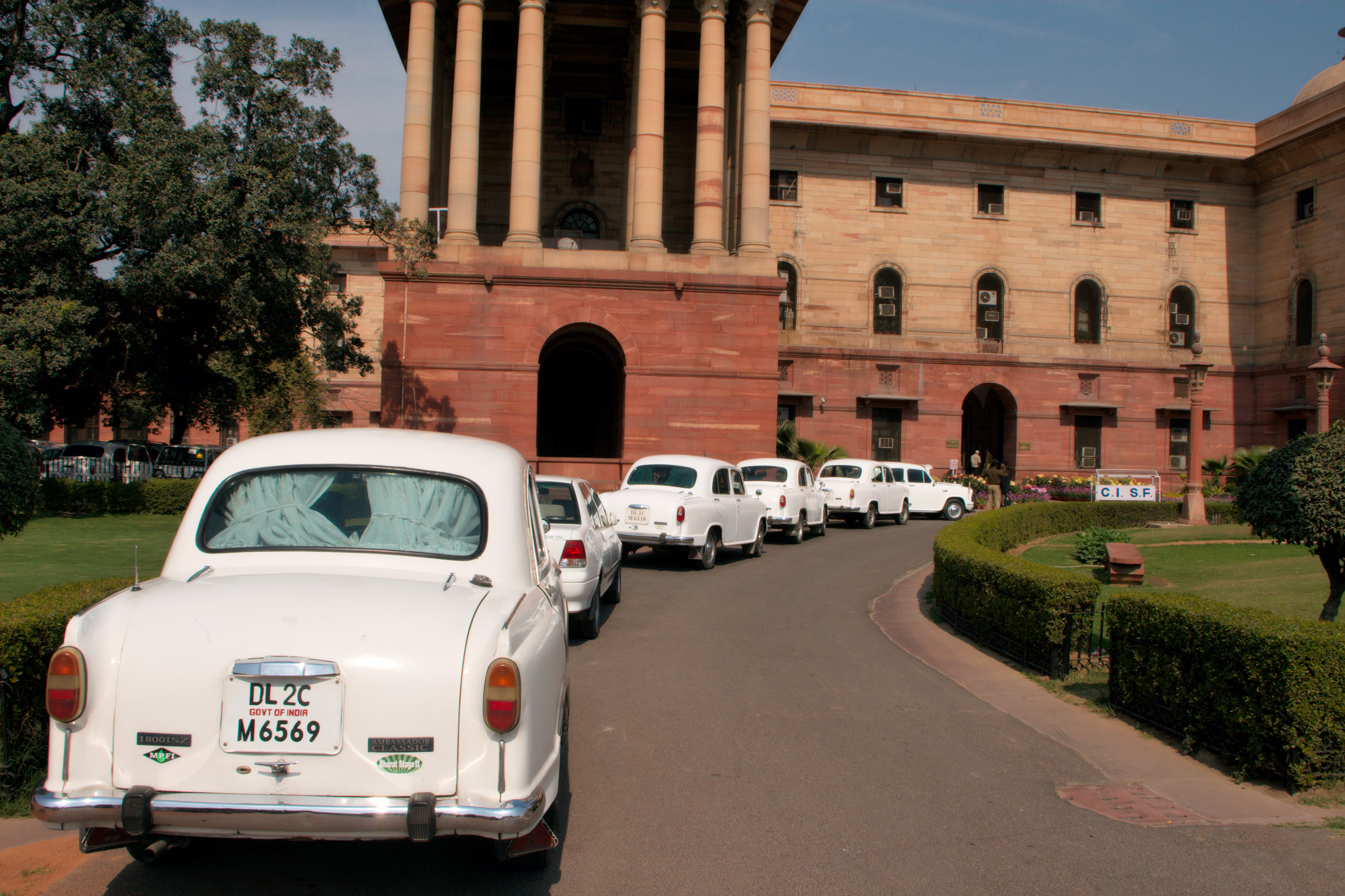
Official Hindustan Ambassador cars parked outside North Block, Secretariat Building, New Delhi

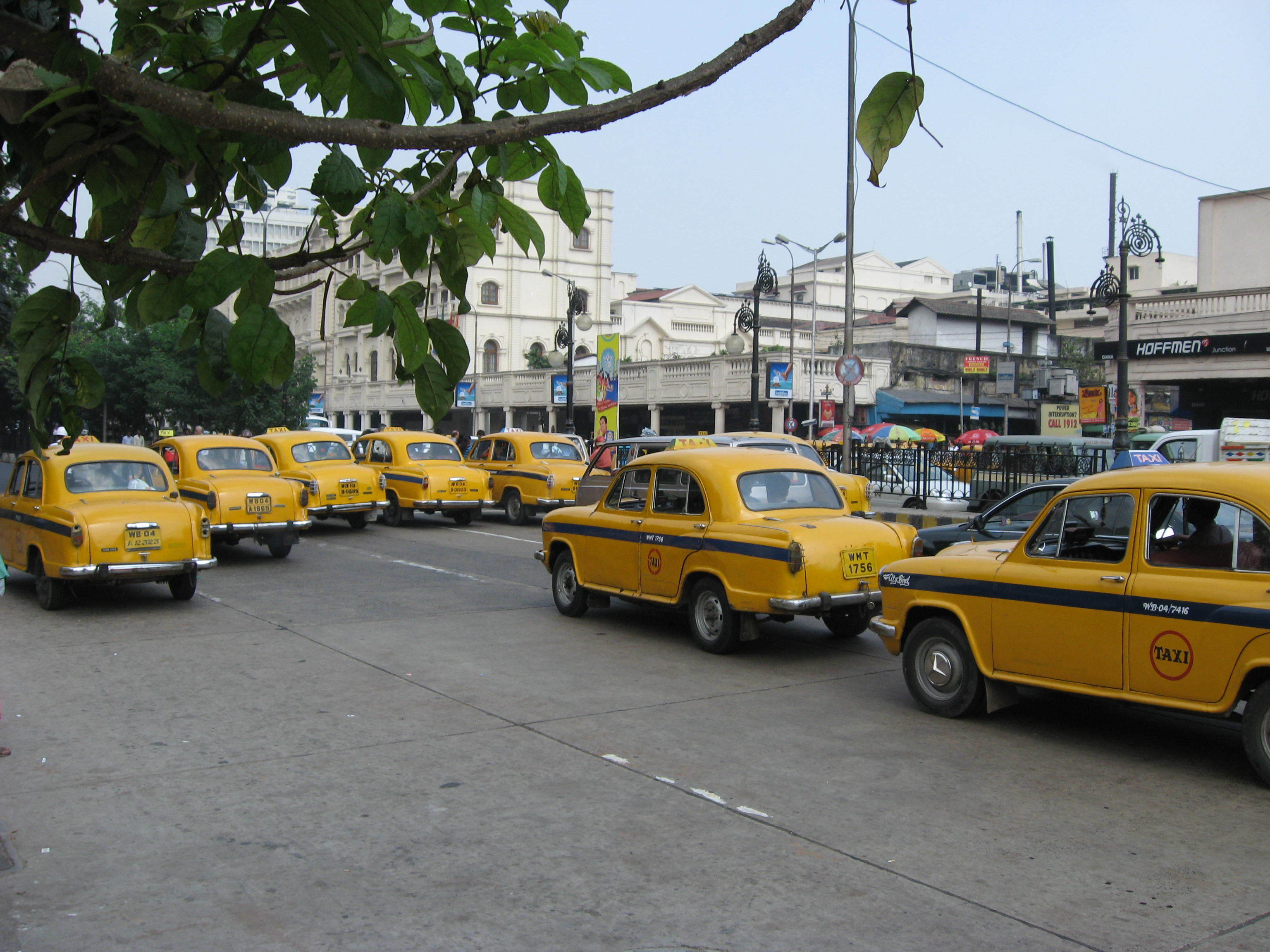
Yellow Taxis in Calcutta/Kolkata

In 1948, Hindustan Motors shifted its assembly plant from Port Okha in Gujarat to Uttarpara/Hindmotor in West Bengal's Hooghly district and strengthened its manufacturing capacity in the automobile segment.

The 1954 Morris Oxford Series II in India was licence-built at Uttarpara, (Hooghly district), West Bengal, three years after its debut in England and labelled as the 1957 Hindustan Landmaster.

Engaged in the manufacture of the Ambassador, Contessa and utility vehicles like the Trekker, Porter and Pushpak, the plant hardly introduced any innovations or improvements. Hindustan Motors was the only manufacturing facility in the world to manufacture parts for the obsolete Bedford trucks.

Sale of Ambassador taxis has been outlawed since 1 April 2011, a year after BS IV emission standards were rolled out in 11 Indian cities, including Kolkata.

In later years, Hindustan Motors fitted the cars with a cleaner diesel engine in order to comply with new emission rules, allowing it to resume taxi service in Kolkata, one of the cities in which the vehicle had been banned.

== Models and versions ==
=== Mark I (1957–1963) ===
Mark I (First generation)
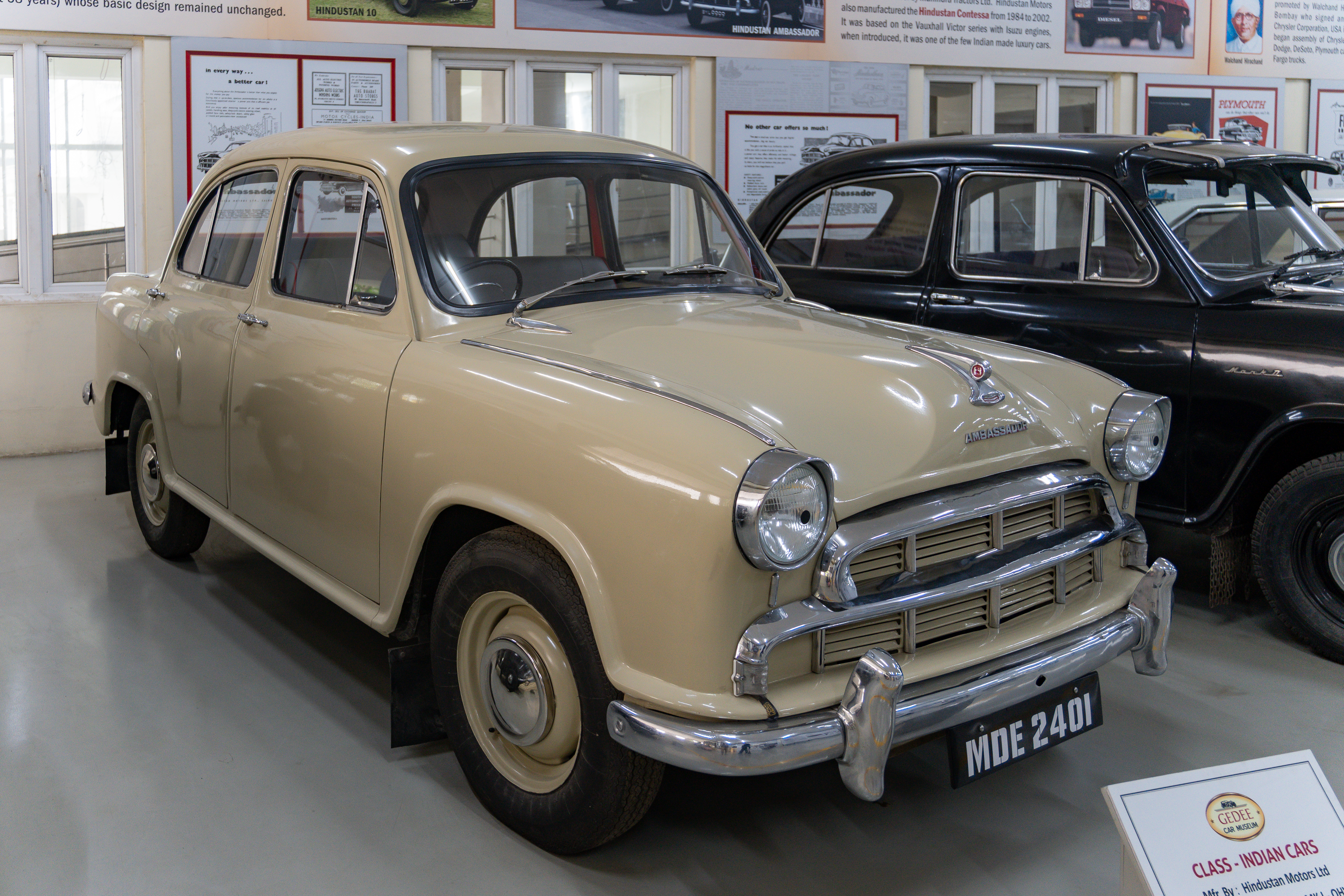

Overview
- Production: 1957–1963

Powertrain
- Engine: 1,489 cc (1.5 L) I4

The Hindustan Ambassador was introduced in 1957, as a rebadge of the Morris Oxford Series III.

Hindustan Motors, to further earlier collaboration with Morris Motors entered into an agreement to manufacture the 1956 Morris Oxford Series III in India. All the tooling was transferred to Uttarpara plant in India. After introduction the Morris Oxford Series II-derived Hindustan Landmaster was discontinued. The new model included deep headlamp cowls and small rear wing "tail fins". The dashboard and steering wheel were completely redesigned. The Landmaster's flat-plane two-spoke steering wheel gave way to a dished steering wheel with three spokes made-up of four wires per spoke, for the Ambassador. Also a new, dimpled bonnet made its debut. These models had an Austin Motors derived 1476 cc side-valve petrol engine. In 1959 the side-valve engine was replaced by a 1489 cc, 55 bhp (41 kW) overhead-valve BMC B-series petrol engine.

=== Mark II (1963–1975) ===
Mark II (Second generation)
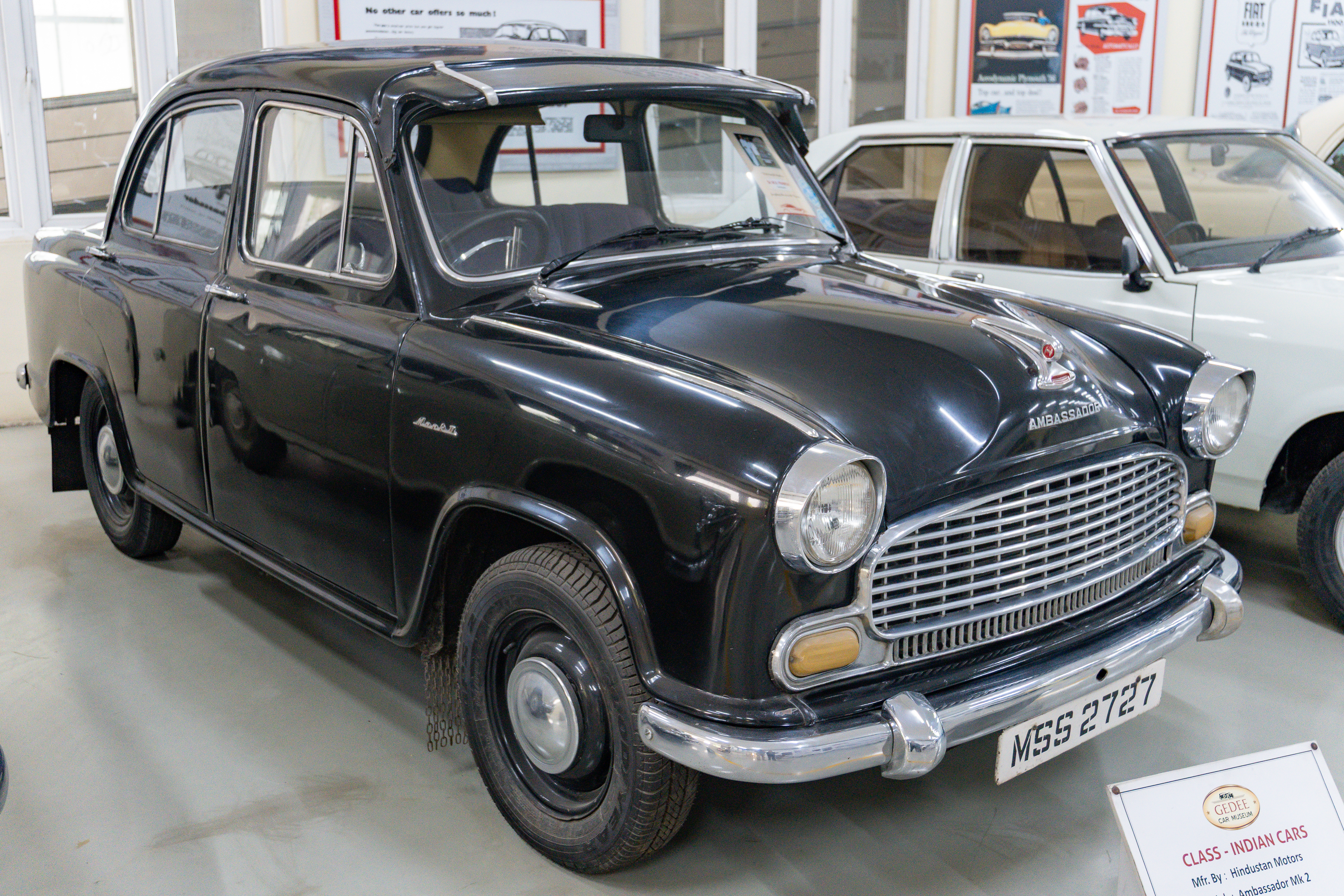

Overview
- Production: November 1963 – June 1975

In November 1963, the Ambassador underwent a frontal facelift with a closely chequered grille more reminiscent of the Morris Mini. The interior had a redesigned dashboard and instrument cluster. The early models had a sun mica sheet but it was replaced by a wood grain coated plywood and an aluminium bezel in later models (1968 onwards). This model was named as the Ambassador Mark II, and the early version quickly got dubbed as Mark I in the market, while it was never officially christened as such in its production days.

The mid-sixties model again had minor changes to the tail lamp with integrated lens for indicator and brake lamp and the tall ornamented bumper stopper from the Mark I was redesigned with a smaller chrome metal stopper to keep up with the time. This model was sold until mid-1975 and was eventually replaced by the Mark III model. Being one of the ubiquitous early models of Ambassador, numerous older versions can be found in restoration, garages and in numerous Indian movies of that era. In its final year in 1975, it had no competition other than the Premier Padmini and its smaller rival the Standard Gazel.

A short-lived estate or wagon version was launched in the early 1970s, the Ambassador Estate.

=== Mark III (1975–1979) ===
Mark III (Third generation)
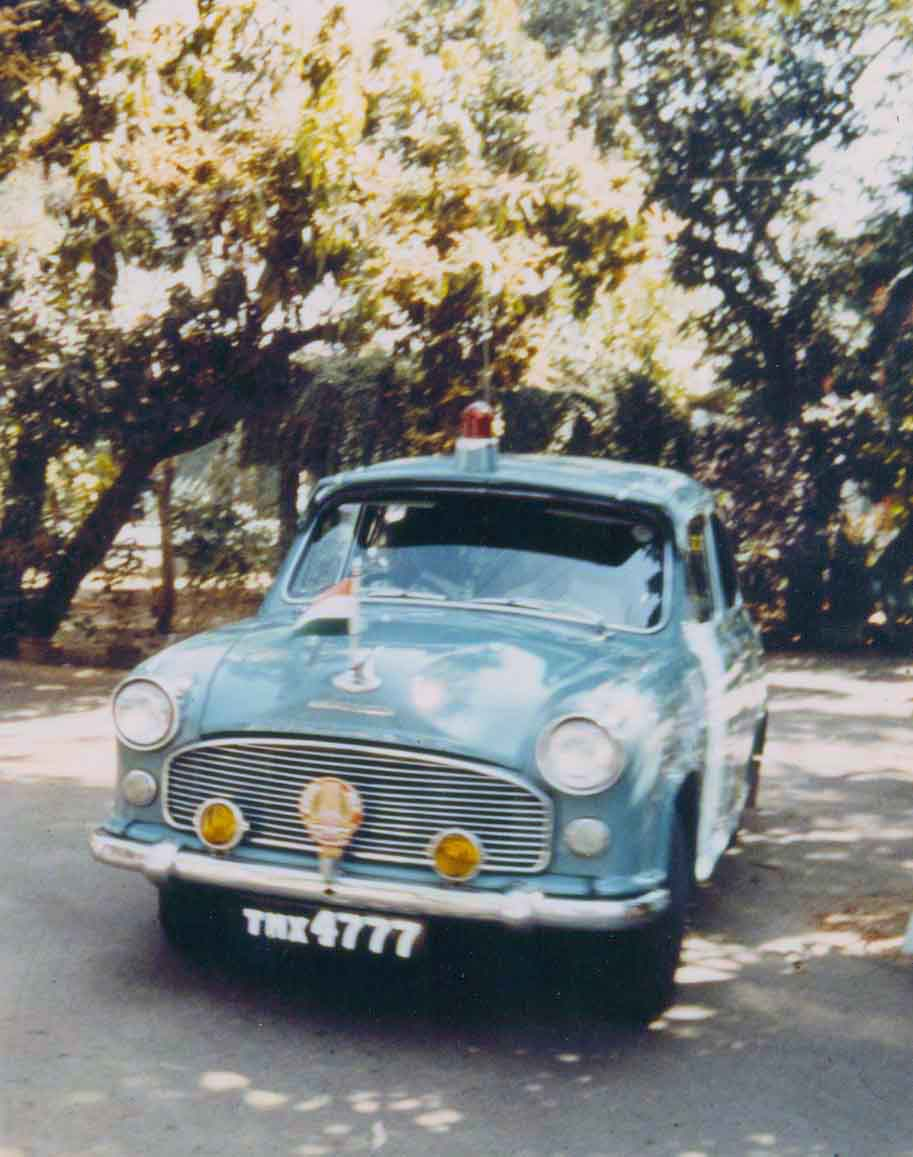

Overview
- Production: 1975–1979

In 1975, the Mark III version was launched with another frontal facelift. The front grille had horizontal louvres giving it a modern feel and a round profile indicator lamp now isolated from the grille. At the rear a more modern looking number plate bezel replaced the early design which was commonly used by many other British cars as well. The interior now had a new dashboard with 3 standard instruments mounted on a black recessed mesh again moving away from the early coated wooden base with aluminium strip design. By 1978, the Mark 3 was available in its Standard and Deluxe versions. The Deluxe version had a newer dashboard with four meters plus the speedometer. Just before the launch of the Mark 4, the Mark 3s had their front windscreen wiper configuration changed, with a common direction sweep for both wipers. This configuration was prevalent in the new Ambassadors until the end of production. This has a short span of less than 3 years in production before being replaced with a Mark - IV model in 1977.

In 1977 and 1978, the Ambassador Mark 3 was available with a 1760 cc version of the Morris 1.5-litre inline-four, specifically to have enough power to propel a full air conditioning system. This option continued to be available as a Mark IV, but very few were sold and it was discontinued in 1979.

=== Mark 4 (1979–1990) ===
Mark 4 (Fourth generation)
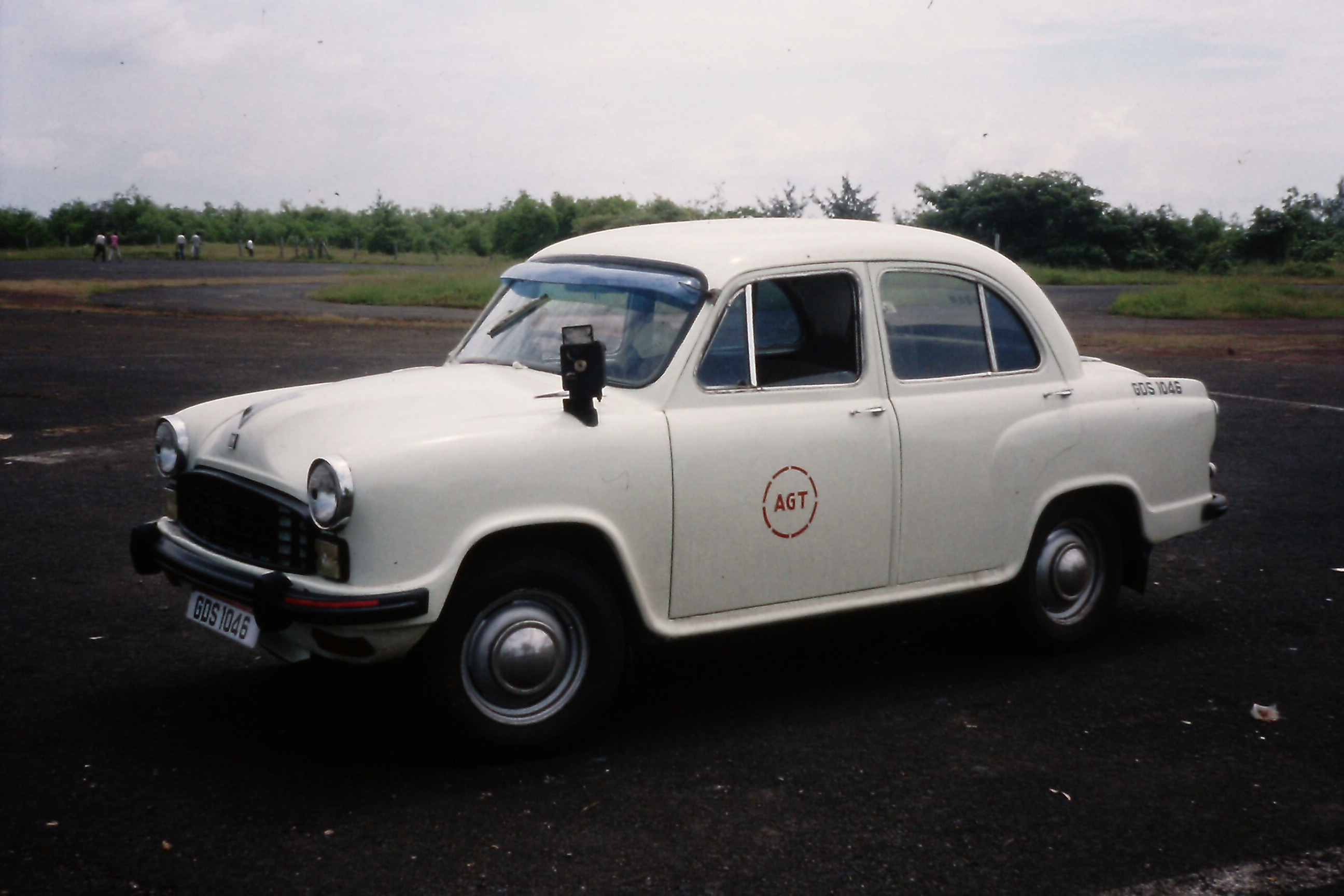

Overview
- Production: 1979–1990

Powertrain
- Engine: 1,489 cc (1.5 L) BMC B-series I4; 1,760 cc (1.8 L) I4; 1,489 cc (1.5 L) BMC B-series diesel I4

In 1979, the Ambassador's front underwent a major facelift departing from the flatter design of the 1950s which was retained until its end in 2014. The front grille was much smaller in height with a larger chequered grille and square park lamps. Now separate amber indicator lamps were incorporated on the semi front lip spoiler below the bumper which was mounted higher up. This model was named as the Mark IV. In addition to the existing petrol version, a diesel variant was launched in 1980, powered by a 1489 cc, 37 bhp (28 kW) BMC B-series diesel engine. It was the first diesel car in India and was well received by the Indians, although it was initially only available as a taxi or for government usage, as the Indian government restricted private ownership of diesel automobiles. It was, at the time, the most expensive car built in India, at a 25 percent markup over a petrol Mark 4.

The Mark IV was the last of the Mark cars. For a short period, the cars were available as Deluxe and later it was renamed Ambassador Nova. The Ambassador of 1990 (except for the front cowl area) was virtually identical to the 1956 original, with most changes being light and cosmetic. The changes were mainly the front styling and minor changes to the dashboard. This technological stagnation was mainly because of the protectionist policies being pursued by the Indian government at the time, and there was little incentive on the part of Indian companies to innovate. During that time, the newly Hindustan Contessa started getting produced, intended to replace the Ambassador, however, the Ambassador proved to be more popular, and so surpassed the Contessa in production.

The car celebrated the Golden Jubilee of its production in 2008 (1958–2008). The Ambassador has emerged as the car mass-produced for the longest period, with minimal design changes, on the same assembly line (Uttarpara, West Bengal, India) in the whole world until 2014.

It was during the Mark IV's model run that India launched a controlled economic liberalisation in the mid-1980s which allowed many Japanese companies to establish joint ventures in India. Maruti Suzuki launched its Maruti 800 in the then non-existing small car category. The then existing manufacturers Standard Motors, Premier Automobiles Limited and Hindustan Motors were licensed for larger category cars. The Ambassador still remained the principal family car of choice in the middle segment in spite being a pre-modern design with dated styling. The company also earmarked for a major upgrade for its mechanical and power plant systems, creating a model later launched as Nova.

=== Ambassador Nova ===
Nova (Fifth generation)
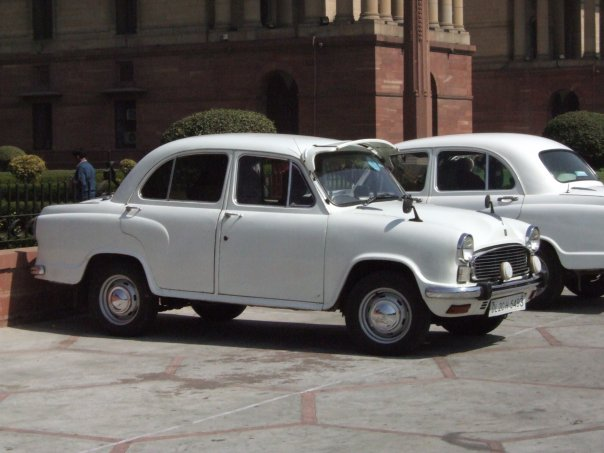

Overview
- Production: 1990–1999

Powertrain
- Engine: 1,489 cc (1.5 L) BMC B-series I4; 1,489 cc (1.5 L) BMC B-series diesel I4

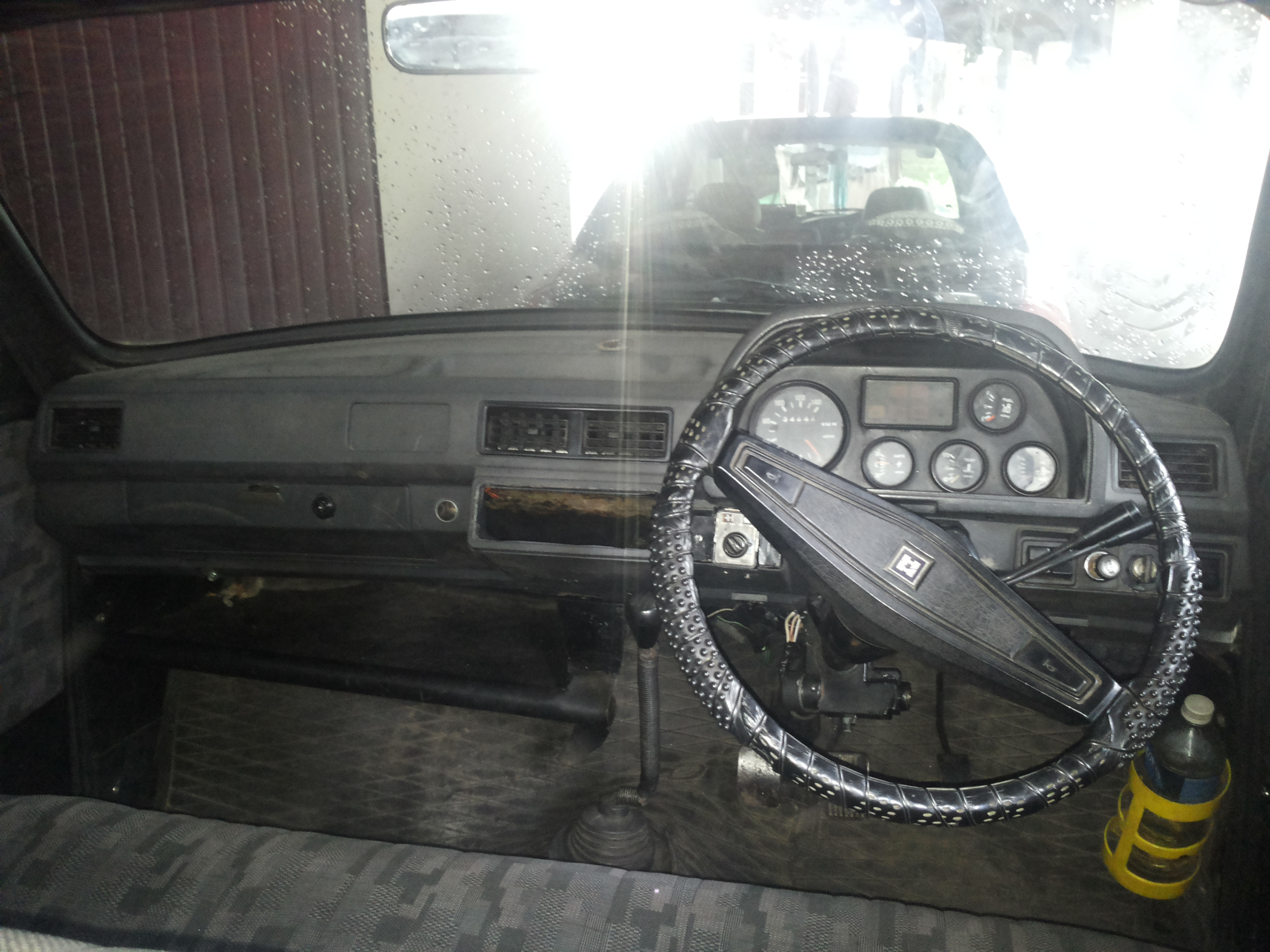
The updated dashboard of the Ambassador Nova

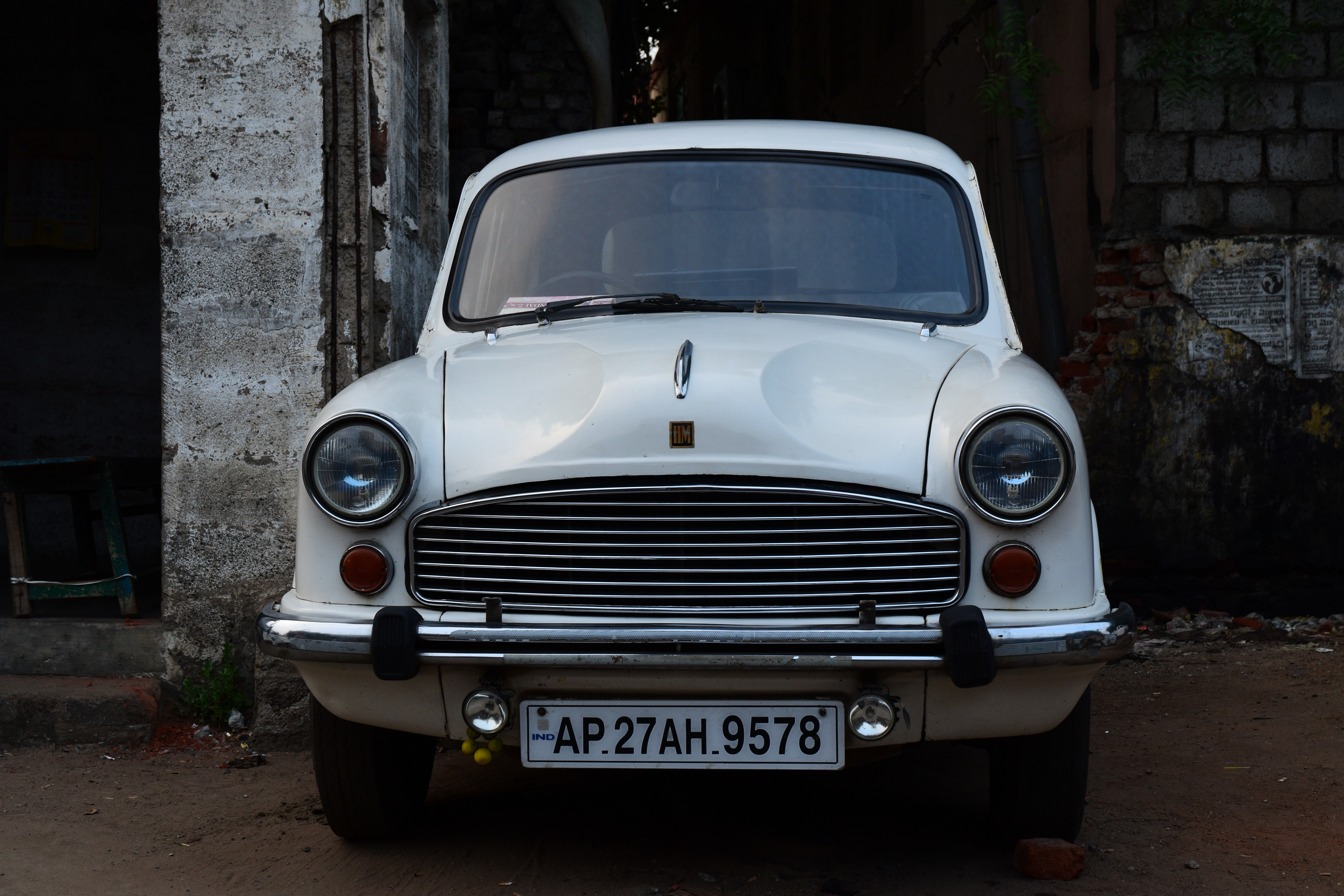

The Ambassador Nova was launched in 1990 in two variants—a 55 bhp (41 kW) petrol-powered Deluxe version and a 37 bhp (28 kW) diesel-powered Diesel DX version. The Ambassador Nova received a newly designed steering wheel, new steering column, better brakes and electricals. The brake pedal was now top-hinged, while the earlier central instrumentation flanked by two glove compartments was replaced by a more conventional setup with a single glovebox. It also had some cosmetic changes which included a new radiator grille, while retaining the square turn signals of the earlier Mark IV.

=== Ambassador 1800 ISZ, Classic, Grand ===
Classic (Sixth generation)
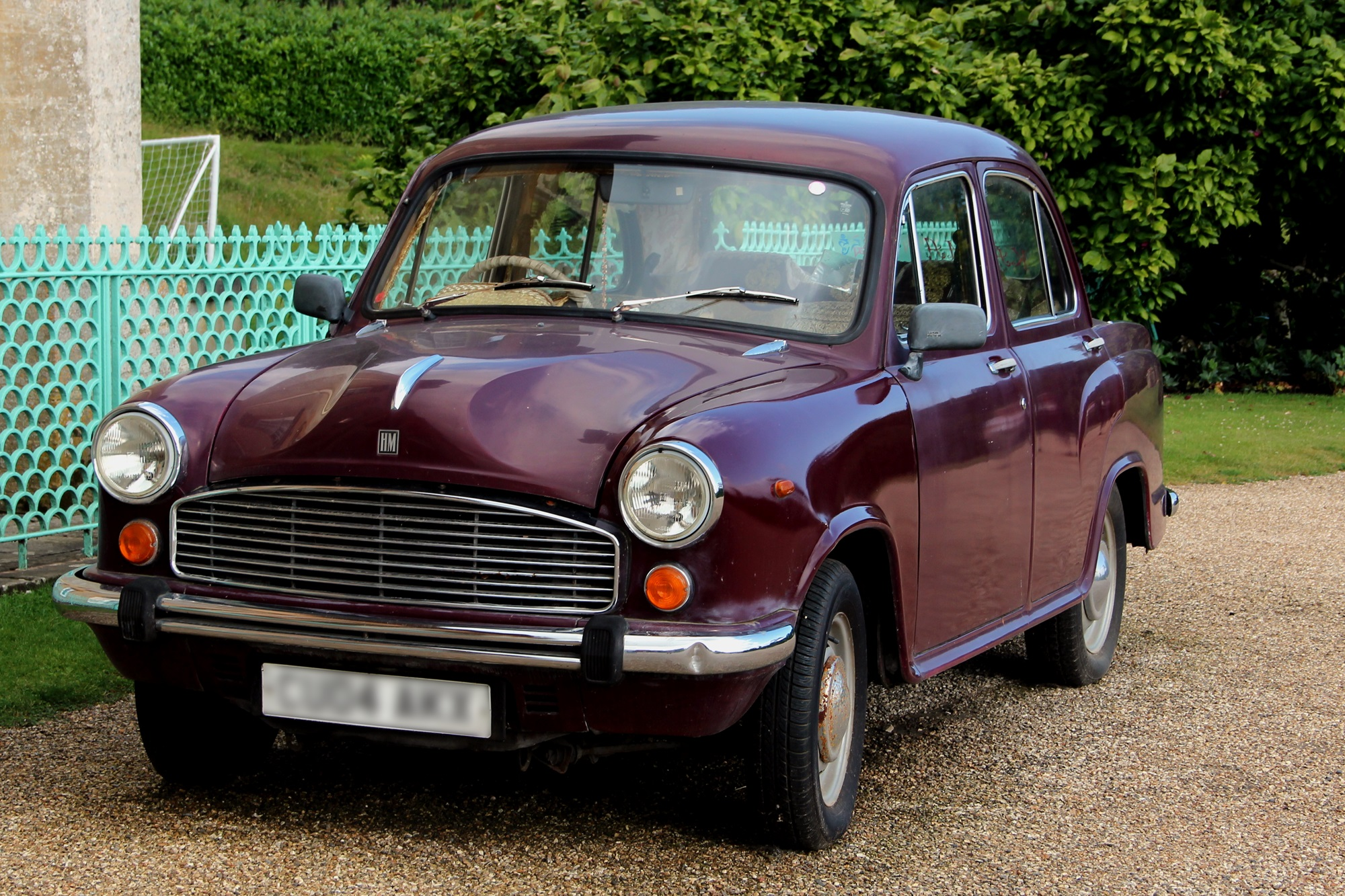

Overview
- Production: 1992–2010 (1800 SZ); 1998–2010 (Classic); 2003–2014 (Grand)

Powertrain
- Engine: 1489 cc BMC B-series I4; 1817 cc 4ZB1 I4; 1489 cc BMC B-series diesel I4; 1995 cc 4FC1 diesel I4

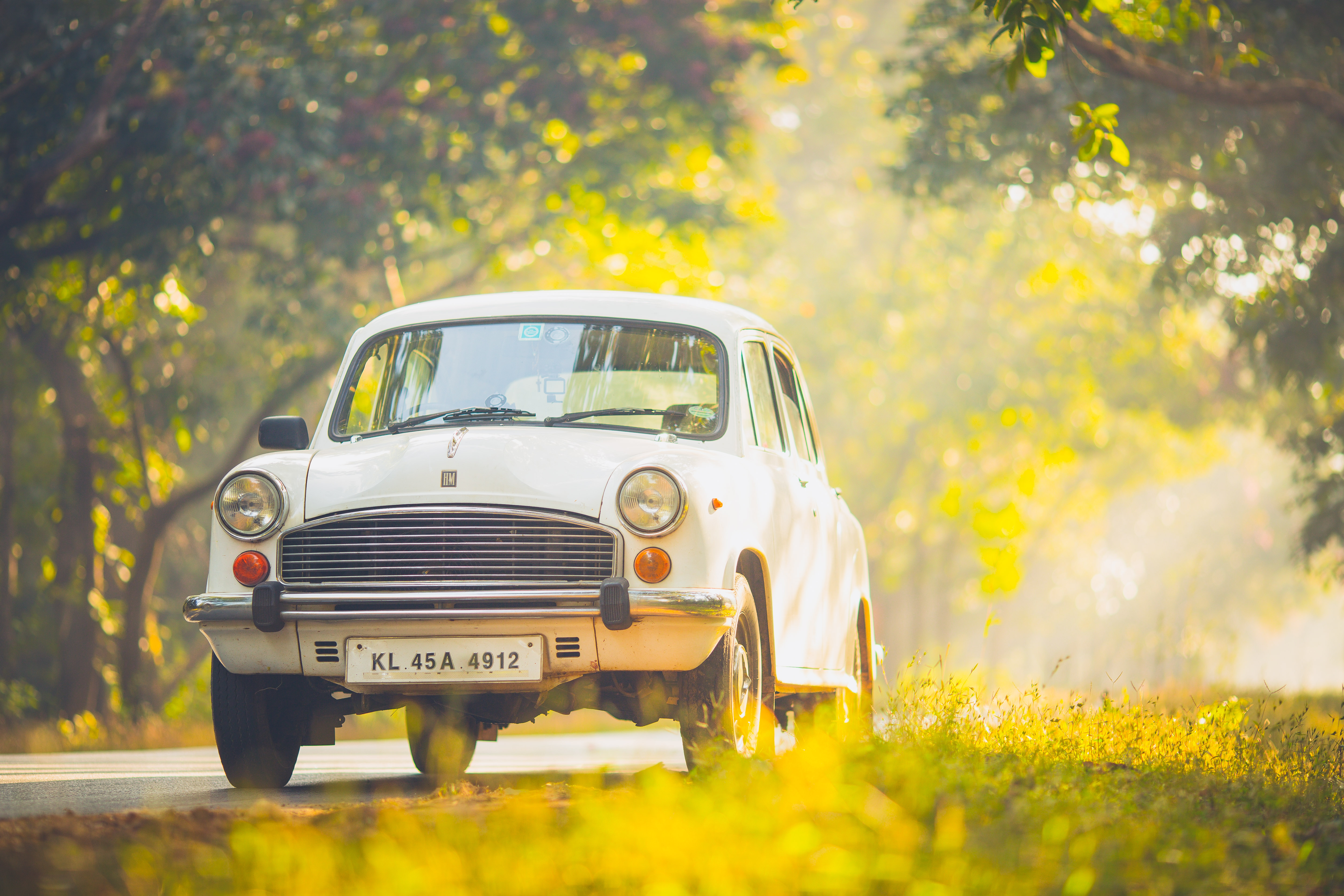
Ambassador Classic on the NH 748 of Goa-Karnataka Border

In an attempt to increase its appeal, in 1992 another version became available. Dubbed the Ambassador 1800 ISZ, this model featured a 75 bhp (56 kW) 1817 cc Isuzu inline-four engine and a five-speed manual gearbox with a floor shift. This also had the benefit of allowing the option of bucket seats, as opposed to the earlier bench seats. Also, the entire dashboard was redesigned. Instrumentation panels were shifted from the centre of the dashboard to the right, behind the steering wheel. Seat belts became standard.

The Isuzu 1817 cc engine that was used in its luxury model HM Contessa 1.8 GL that produced a power of 88 bhp (66 kW) was slightly detuned for the new Ambassador. The same power plant was available since 1985, for the special order armour plated, VIP models. By the early 1990s, this 1817 cc 75 bhp (56 kW) (at 5000 rpm), OHC, Isuzu engine, that had four in-line cylinders and a max torque of 13.8 kg⋅m (135 N⋅m; 100 lb⋅ft) at 3000 rpm, was available as an option, in all the Ambassadors commonly available for sale and this very reliable modern Japanese engine proved to be a success that would last its entire production run.

This model gained the "Classic" moniker at the 1998 Delhi Motor Show, and Ambassador Classics have since been available with the gamut of 1.5 to 2.0-liter petrol, CNG, and diesel engines installed across the Ambassador lineup. The 1500 diesel engine, the main seller for Hindustan, did not pass Bharat IV emissions and as of 2011 it was no longer allowed to be sold in 13 of India's major cities. This meant the end of the Classic range, as it eliminated most of the taxi market.

=== Final Generation ===
==== Ambassador Grand ====
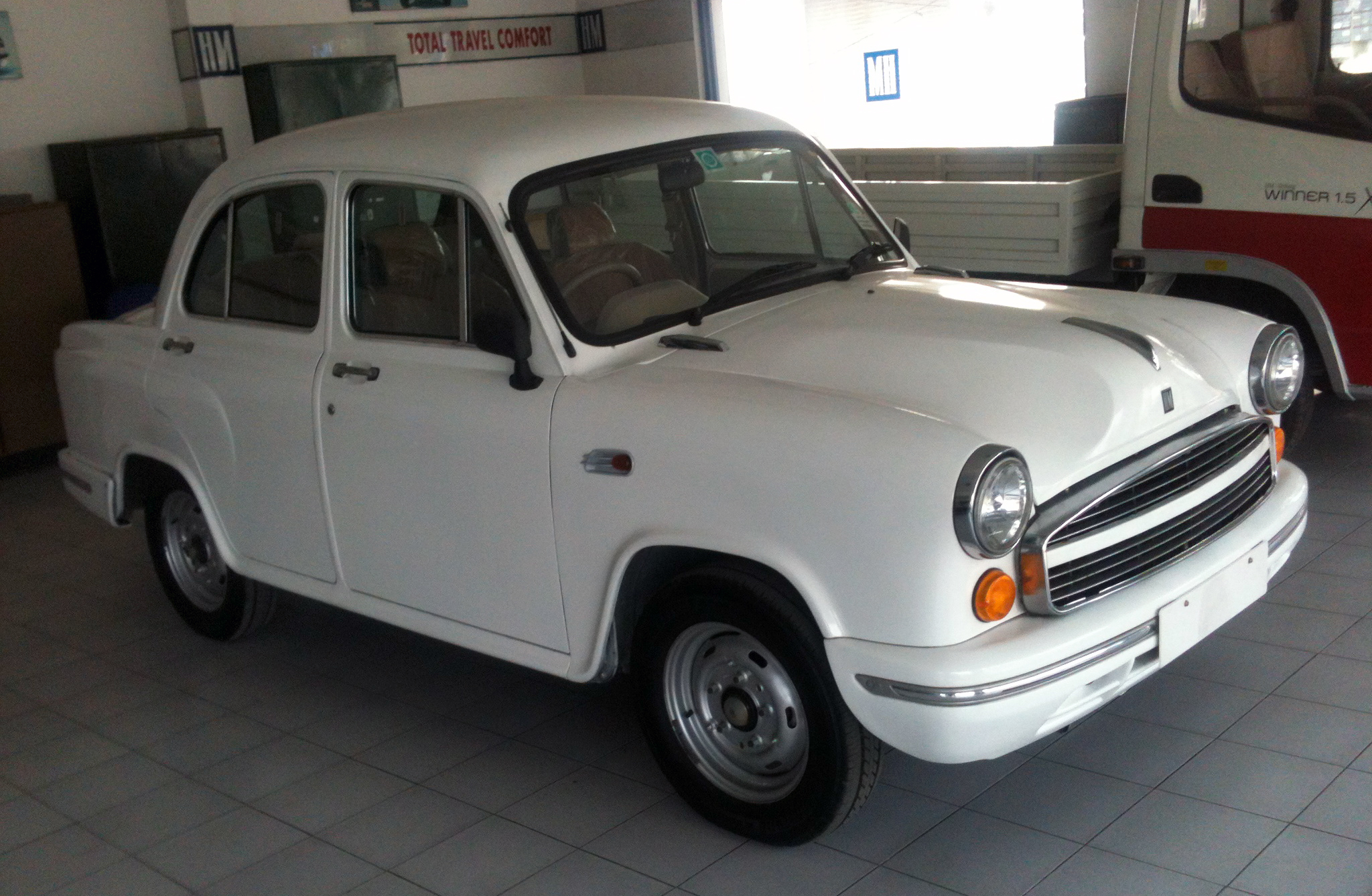
2013 Hindustan Ambassador Grand 2000DSZ in a showroom.

The Ambassador Grand was launched in 2003 and as per the manufacturer, the new version had 137 changes compared to its predecessor. The changes included a switch to body coloured wrap around bumpers, camel coloured interiors, fabric seats, remote shift gear lever, moulded roof and door trims, Salisbury axle, bigger rear wheel drums, improved suspension with anti roll bar and Metlon bushes, central door lock, factory fitted music system and an optional sun roof. The acoustic insulation of the Ambassador Grand was developed by Trèves S.A.S. of France. The Grand version of Ambassador was available only in 2.0L and 1.8L engines at first and later in 2007 the 1.5L model was added to the line.

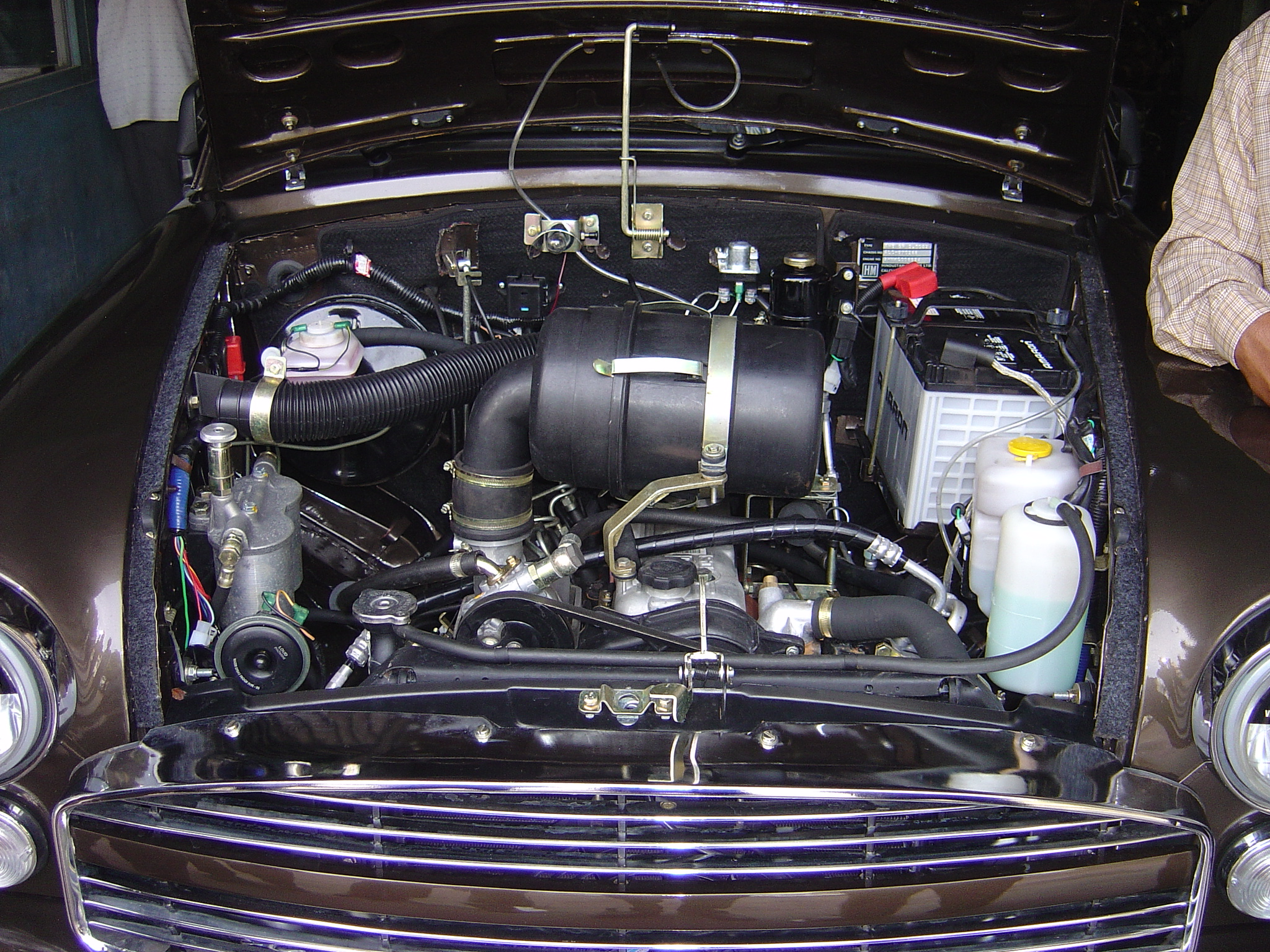
2003 Ambassador Grand engine

==== Ambassador Avigo ====
Hindustan Motors Avigo
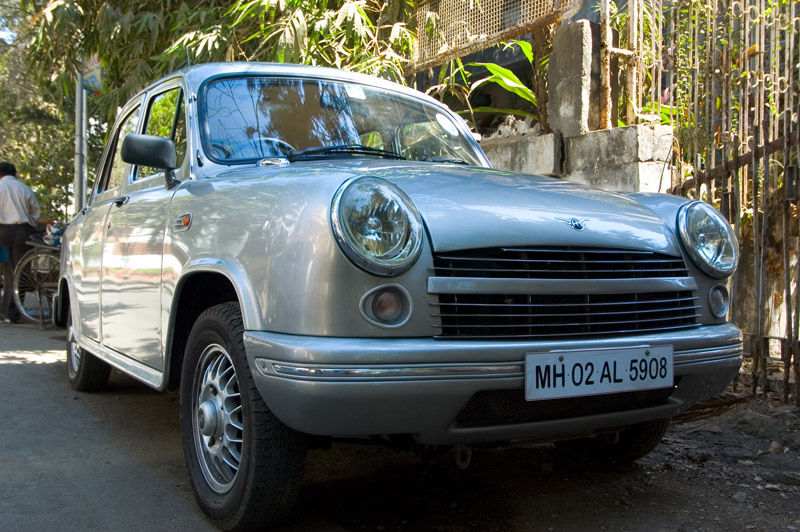

Overview
- Manufacturer: Hindustan Motors
- Also called: Hindustan Avigo
- Production: 2004–2010

Body and chassis
- Body style: 4-door saloon
- Layout: FR layout
- Related: Morris Oxford Series III

Powertrain
- Engine: 1817 cc I4; 1995 cc diesel I4

Dimensions
- Wheelbase: 2,464 mm (97.0 in)
- Length: 4,325 mm (170.3 in)
- Width: 1,662 mm (65.4 in)
- Height: 1,593 mm (62.7 in)

Chronology
- Predecessor: Hindustan Ambassador

The Avigo model launched in 2004 was the most radical revision of the venerated Ambassador, a part of a brand revitalisation kicked off in the middle of 2003. The change of name, a break from the Ambassador marque, indicated a different marketing strategy. The Avigo was launched in the summer of 2004. The revitalized lineup consisted of the Ambassador Classic of mid-2003, the Ambassador Grand of late 2003, and the aforementioned Avigo, with the exterior designed by Manvindra Singh. However, the most overpowering influence on the front bonnet has been that of the original Landmaster series (also based on Morris Oxford). The main panels at the rear remained the same but the tail lamp and name plate bezels were redesigned. In interior the Avigo, however, has much more classic-touch internals. The entire dashboard console was redesigned with a classic retro theme reminiscent of the early models with central mounted meter new clusters (like the Mark IV models). Seats were specially built for this model with dual tone beige coloured scheme and wood-grain interiors. A factory fitted 6CD Kenwood audio system and new air-conditioning system was installed. The car was priced higher than the existing models.

==== Ambassador Encore ====
This new model was launched in September 2013, to match the BS IV standards of the metropolitan cities with the 1.5-liter diesel, the same basic 1489 cc Overhead Valve (OHV) now fitted with an intercooler turbocharger. This version was developed with the aid of Austria's Magna Steyr. The new car looks just like an Ambassador Grand and has the same overall dimensions as that of the BS III Ambassadors, although power had climbed to 48.6 bhp (36.25 kW). The steering wheel was the two-spoke affair first seen in the Nova. In 2013, left-hand drive versions were still built in small numbers for export, to tertiary markets like Nigeria.

== Engines ==
In the early 1990s, the old Austin-designed B-Series OHV straight-4 BMC 1.5L petrol engine was replaced in favour of an Isuzu 1.8 litre engine and became the fastest production car in India, beating Fiats, and the Maruti Suzuki cars at that time. The engines currently available are the 1500 DSL (1.5L 37 bhp [28 kW] diesel engine), 1800 ISZ (1.8 L 75 bhp [56 kW] MPFI petrol engine), 2000 DSZ (2.0 L 50 bhp [37 kW] Isuzu diesel engine) and 2000 DSZ Turbo (2.0 L 75 bhp [56 kW] turbocharged intercooled Isuzu diesel engine).

In the late 1970s a limited batch of Mark III Ambassadors were produced with 1,760 cc engines. They were fitted with Constant Velocity SU side-draft carburettors of an earlier era instead of the more common indigenous variable velocity Solex down-draft units. The engine blocks of these cars had "1760" etched on them instead of the usual "1500". These were probably produced to handle the extra load of the piston-driven air conditioner compressors available in those days. The trim (metal beading) of these cars were a throwback to the sixties because they were chrome plated instead of aluminium.

== Reception ==
The Ambassador was claimed to be the best taxi in the world by Top Gear in Episode 2 of their 20th series.

An article by Hormazd Sorabjee entitled An Epitaph for India's "Appalling" National Car appeared in a July 2014 issue of BBC Magazine.

=== Other variants ===
A local customiser, Parikh Coach Builders, had created an Ambassador limousine which had found its place in the Limca Book of Records.

== See also ==
- Automotive industry in India
