= Morris Oxford Series III =

Morris Oxford
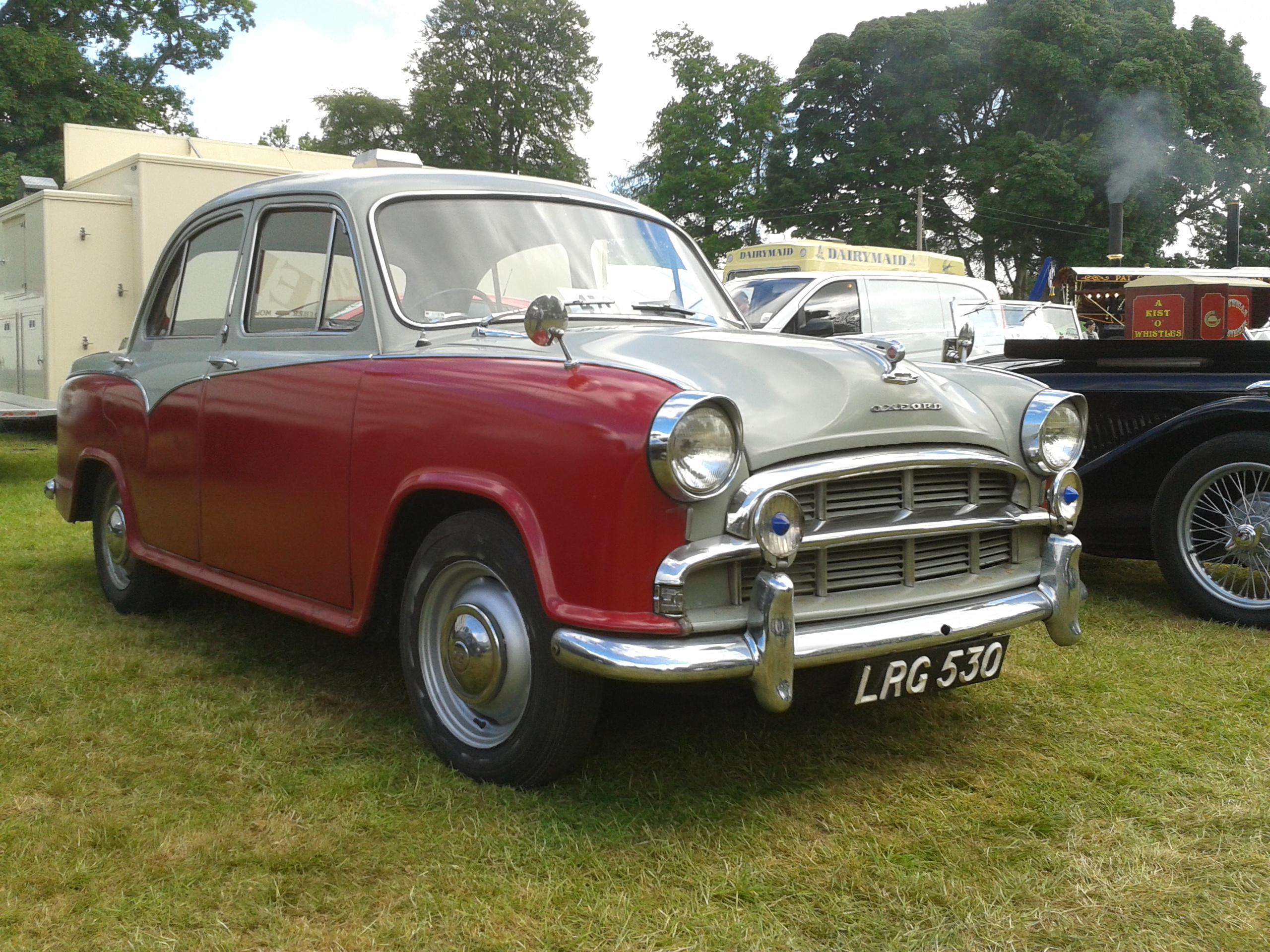
- Oxford Series III saloon 1958

Overview
- Manufacturer: Morris Motors; British Motor Corporation; British Leyland
- Production: 1913–1914; 1919–1935; 1948–1971

Body and chassis
- Class: Large family car

Morris Oxford is a series of motor car models produced by Morris Motors of the United Kingdom, from the 1913 bullnose Oxford to the Farina Oxfords V and VI. The manufacture of Morris's Oxford cars, named by William Morris after the university town in which he grew up, would turn Oxford into an industrial city.

From 1913 to mid-1935 Oxford cars grew in size and quantity. In 1923 they with the Cowley cars were 28.1 per cent of British private car production. In 1925 Morris sold near double the number and they represented 41 per cent of British production. The model name was recycled in 1948 and lasted almost another 23 years through to 1971 but in this time the market sector and engine-size remained nearly constant between 1476 cc and 1622 cc.

Aside from the Oxford Sixes and the Oxford Empire models all Oxfords since 1918 have been 12 or 14 HP cars of about 1500 to 1800 cc.

== Saloon ==
Oxford III
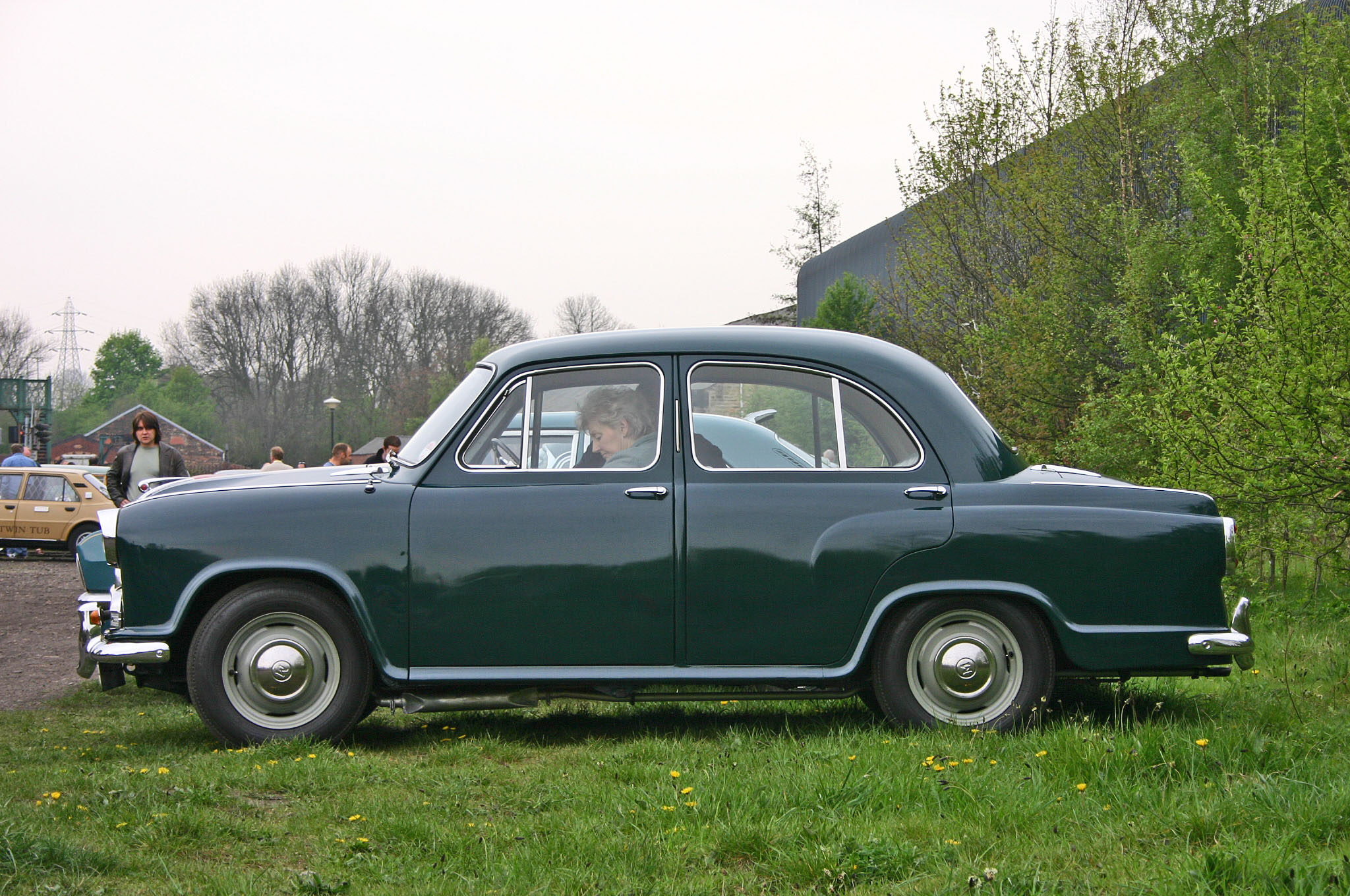
- Oxford Series III

Overview
- Production: 1956–1959; 58,117 produced inc. Series IV; was made in India as Hindustan Ambassador
- Assembly: United Kingdom; Australia

Body and chassis
- Body style: 4-door saloon 2-door estate
- Related: Hindustan Ambassador

Powertrain
- Engine: 1489 cc BMC B-Series engine Straight-4
- Transmission: 4-speed manual

Dimensions
- Wheelbase: 97 in (2,500 mm); 108 in (2,700 mm)
- Length: 178 in (4,500 mm)
- Width: 65 in (1,700 mm)
- Height: 64 in (1,600 mm)

Chronology
- Predecessor: Morris Oxford Series II
- Successor: Morris Oxford Series V

The Oxford was updated for 1957 with a new fluted bonnet and small rear fins and an optional two-tone paint scheme all announced on 18 October 1956. Inside the bench seats trimmed in leather remained but the instrument cluster was revised and a new dished steering wheel fitted. The engine now produced 55 hp (41 kW) following an increase in compression ratio though the top speed and acceleration remained the same. A semi-automatic, two pedal, "Manumatic" transmission with centrifugal clutch with vacuum operation coupled to gear changes was optional. Independent front-suspension with forward torsion bars continued to promise "above average comfort" for the car's occupants, It is designed to compete with the Ford Consul Mk2, Austin A55 Cambridge, and the Vauxhall Victor F.

=== Traveller ===
The 'woody' Series III Traveller was replaced by the Series IV in 1957, though the saloon remained in production until 1959, when the Series V styled by Carrozzeria Pinin Farina (later Pininfarina) was introduced. 58,117 Series III and Series IV Oxfords were built.

Motor magazine tested a Series III manumatic equipped saloon in 1957 recording a top speed of 74.4 mph (119.7 km/h), virtually unchanged from the Series II and acceleration from 0–60 mph (97 km/h) in 30.5 seconds, adversely affected by the Manumatic option. Fuel consumption of 27.0 miles per imperial gallon (10.5 L/100 km; 22.5 mpg_{‑US}) was found. The test car cost £898 including taxes of £300.

=== Ambassador ===
This car was the basis for the Hindustan Ambassador or 'Amby' which was built in India until 2014. The car featured a few styling updates but kept the original look, albeit with modern powertrains. Sales declined from a high of 24,000 units a year in the mid-1980s to under 12,000 a decade later and to less than 6,000 in the mid-2000s. Hindustan Motors stopped production of the Ambassador cars in May 2014.

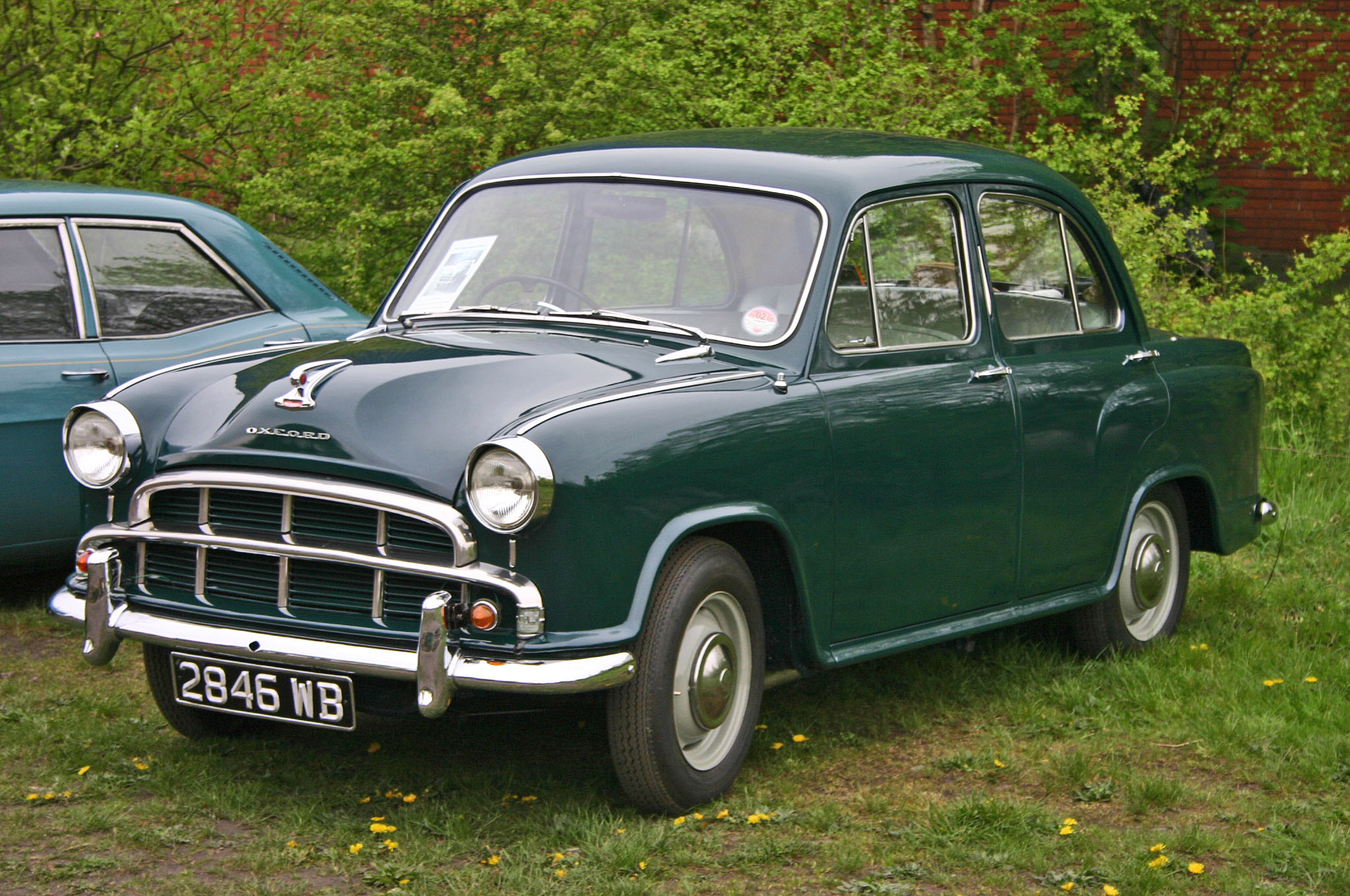
Oxford III 1957

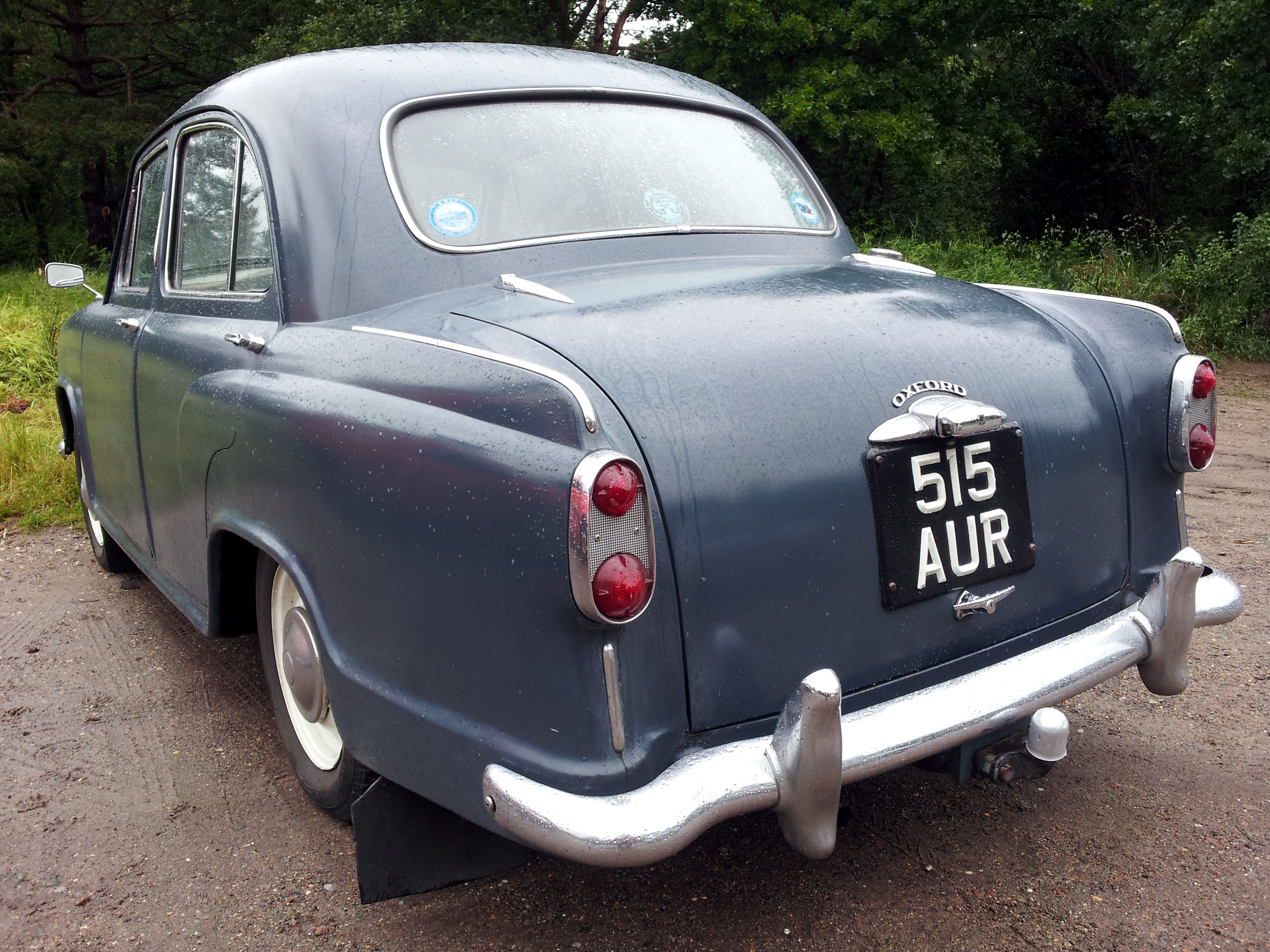
Oxford III 1957

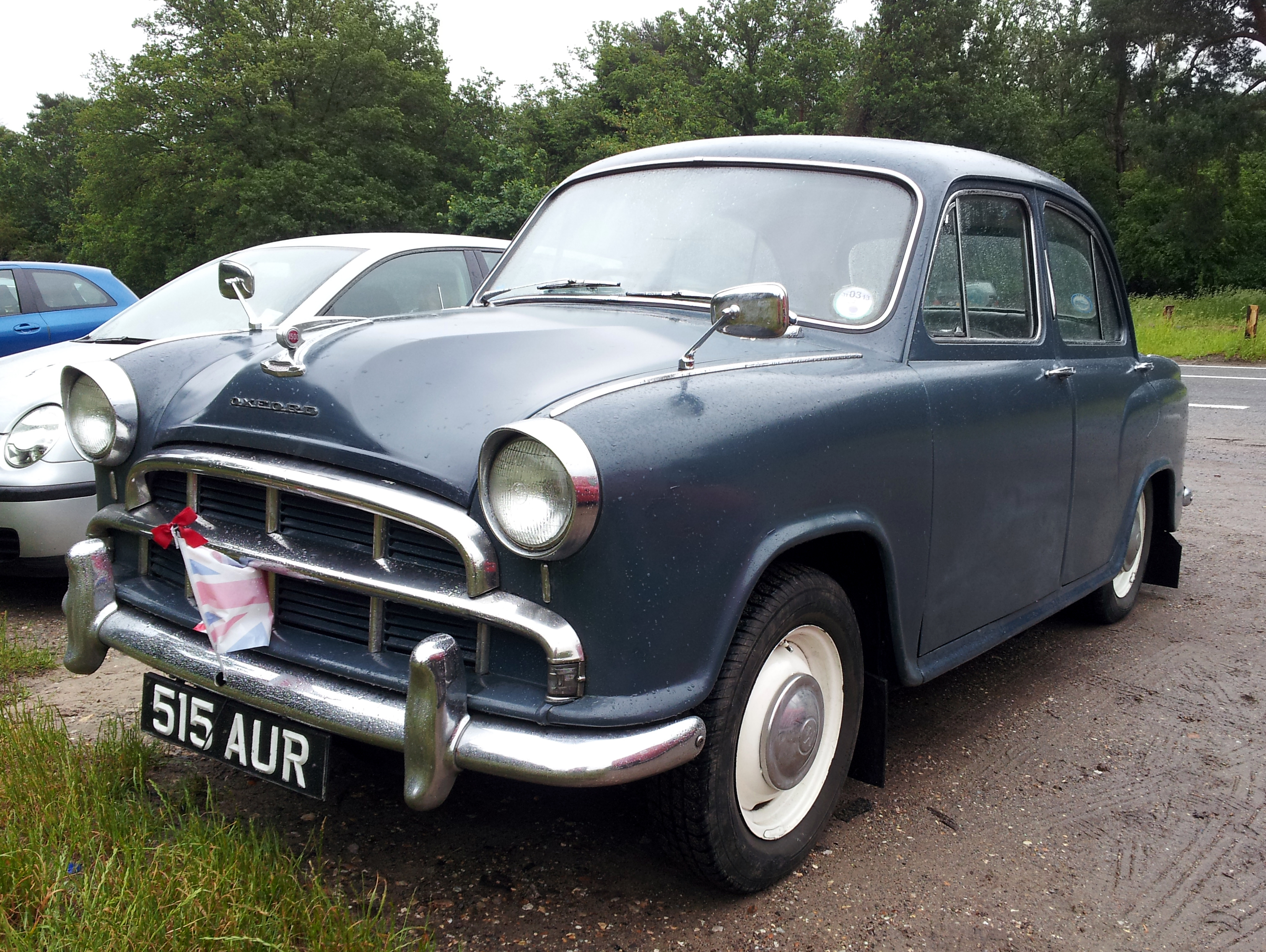
Oxford III 1957

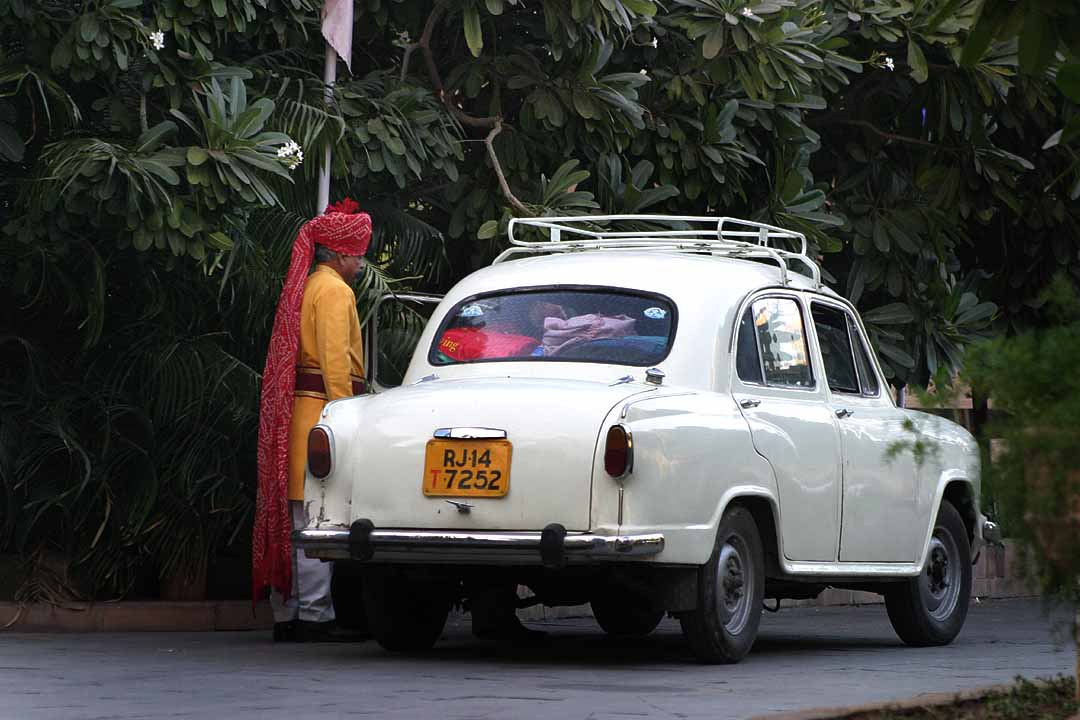
Hindustan Ambassador
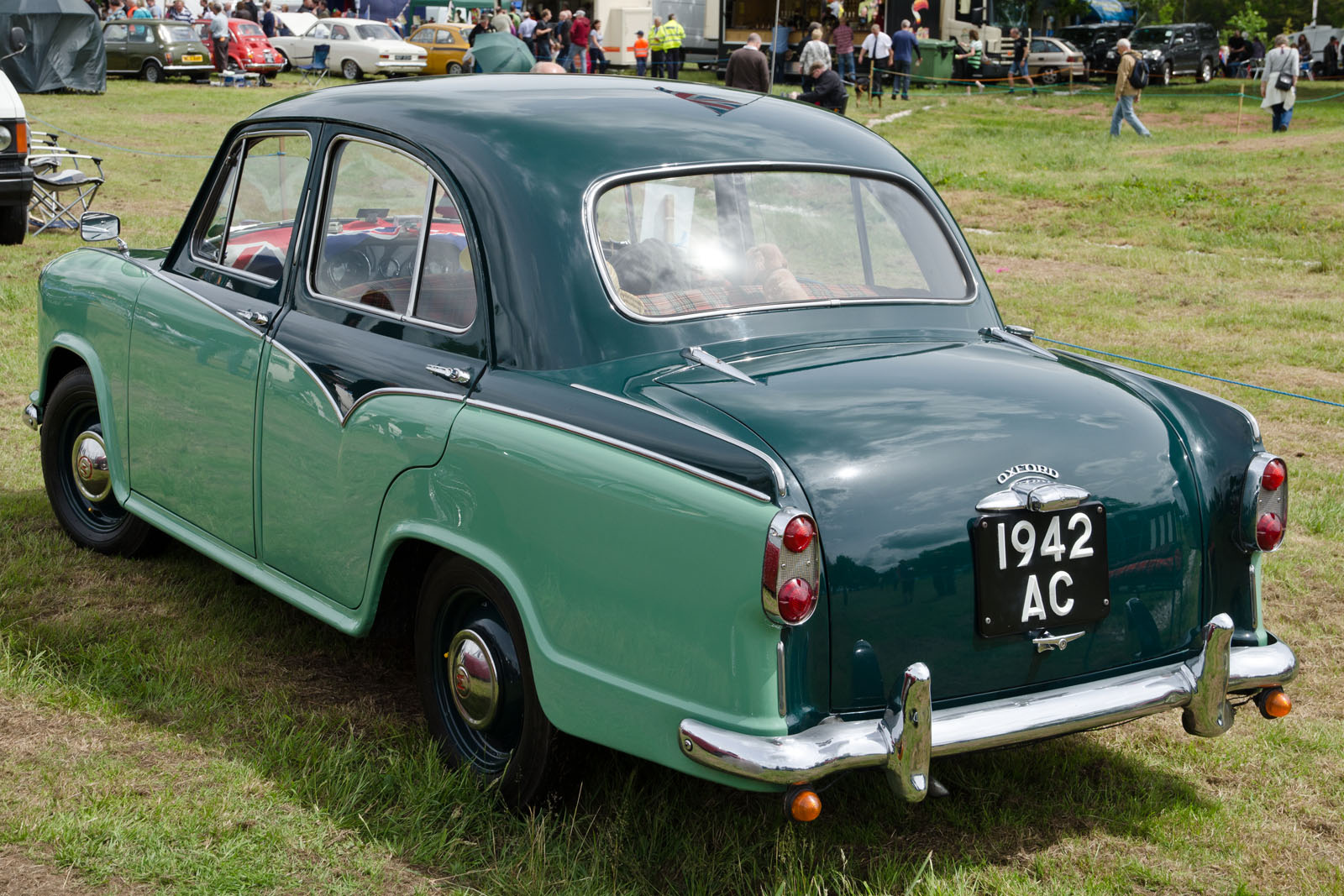
Oxford III 1958

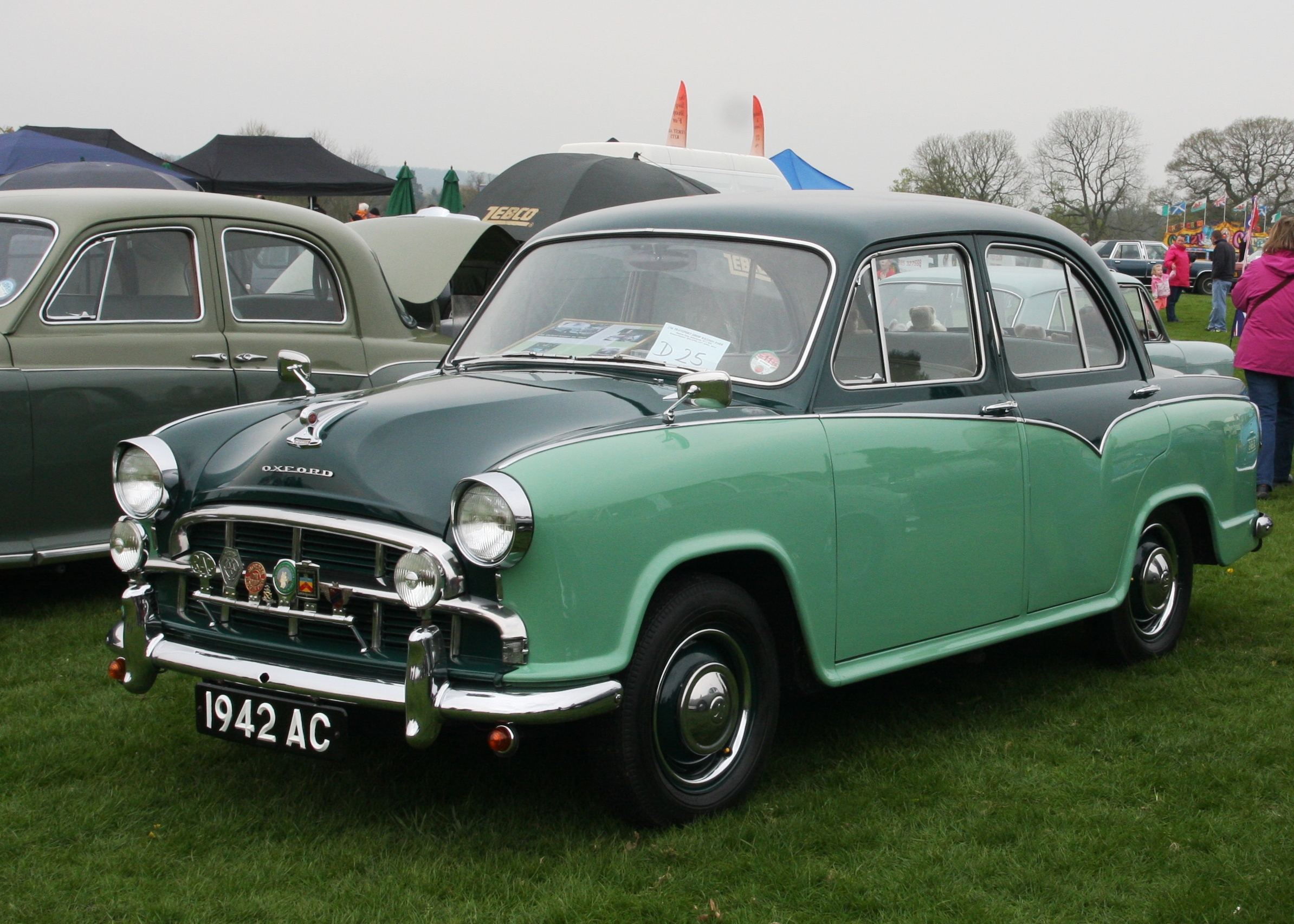
Oxford III 1958

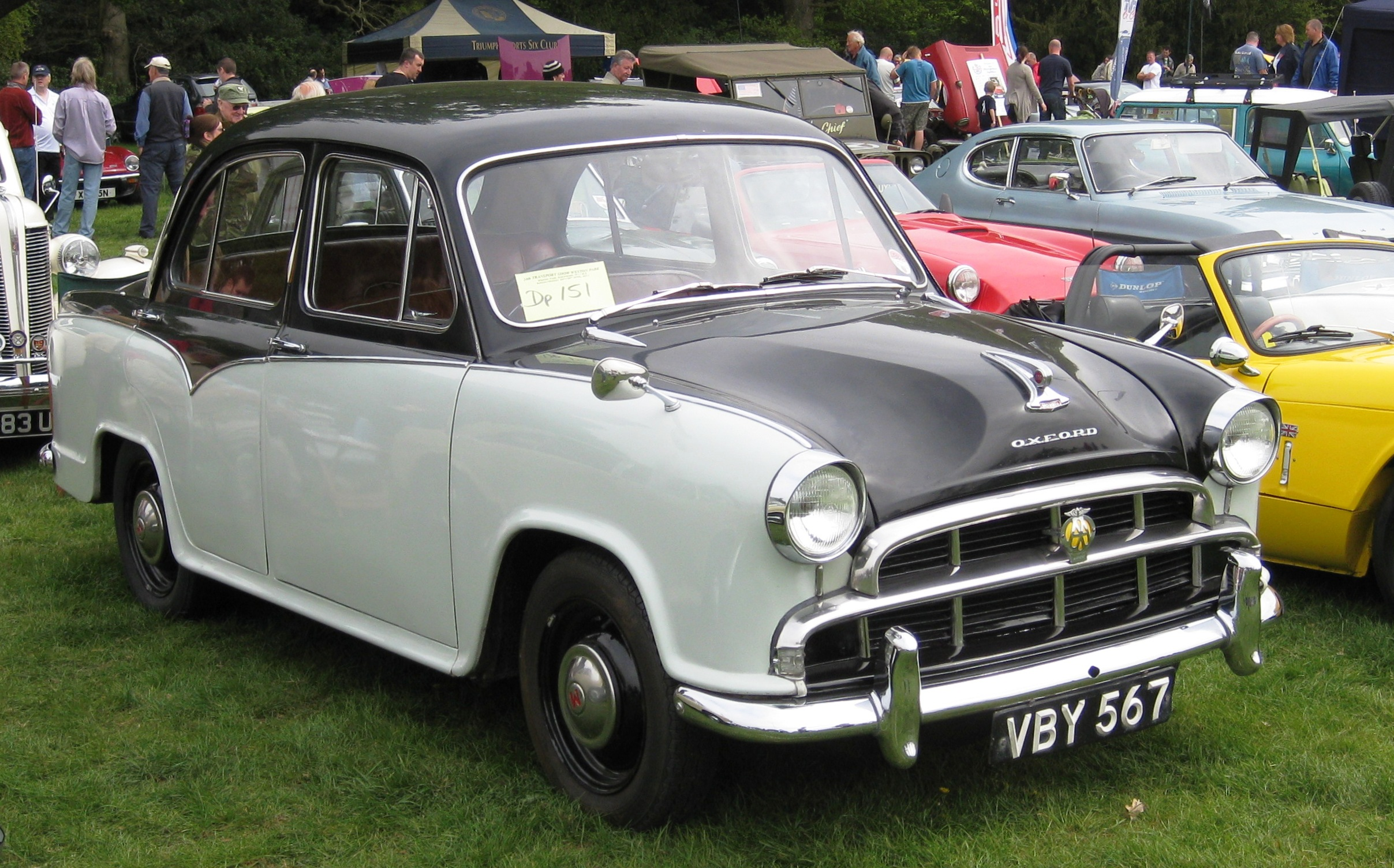
Oxford III 1959

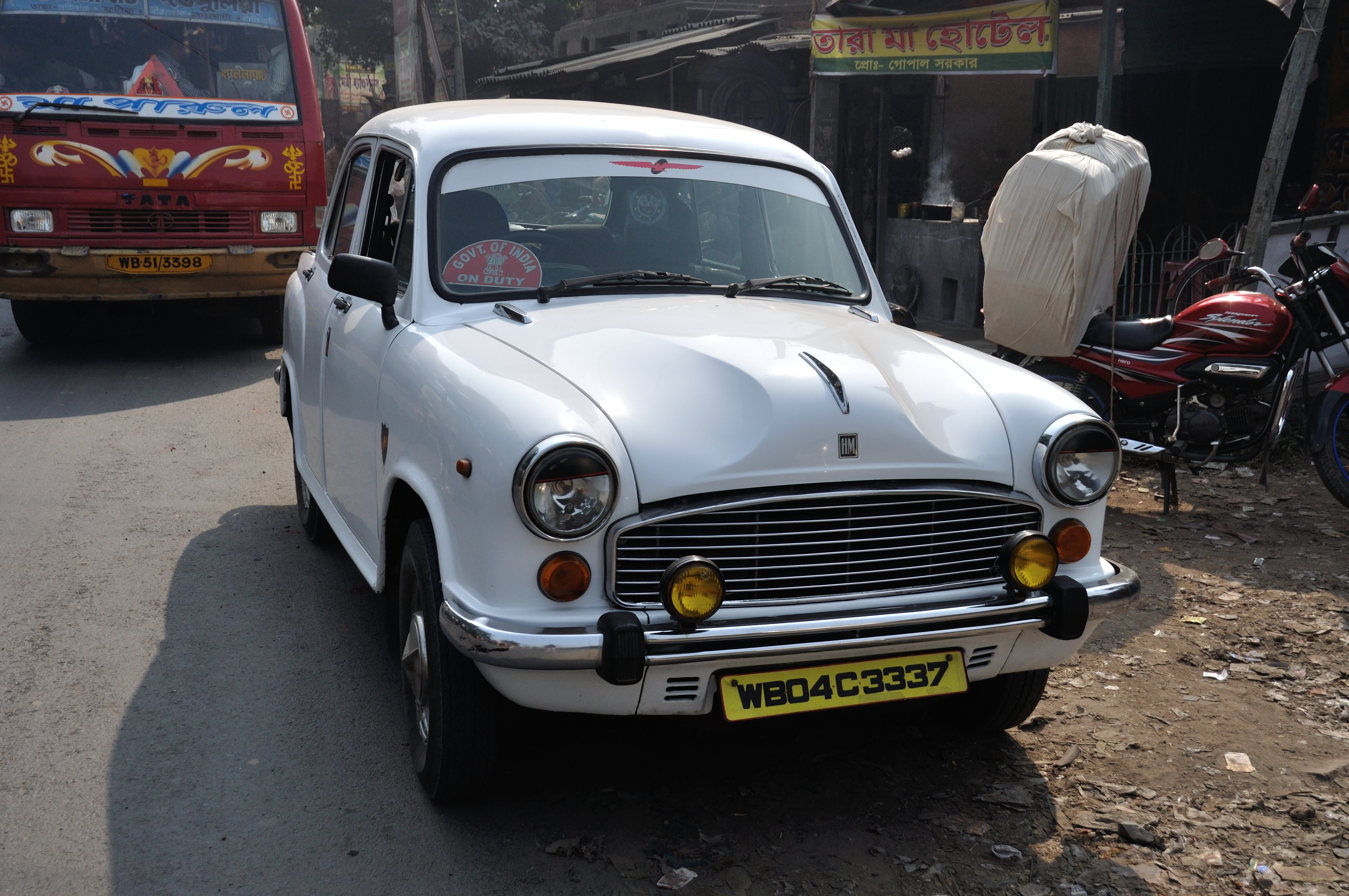
Hindustan Ambassador

== Oxford Traveller all-steel Series IV (1957–1960) ==
Oxford Traveller all-steel Series IV
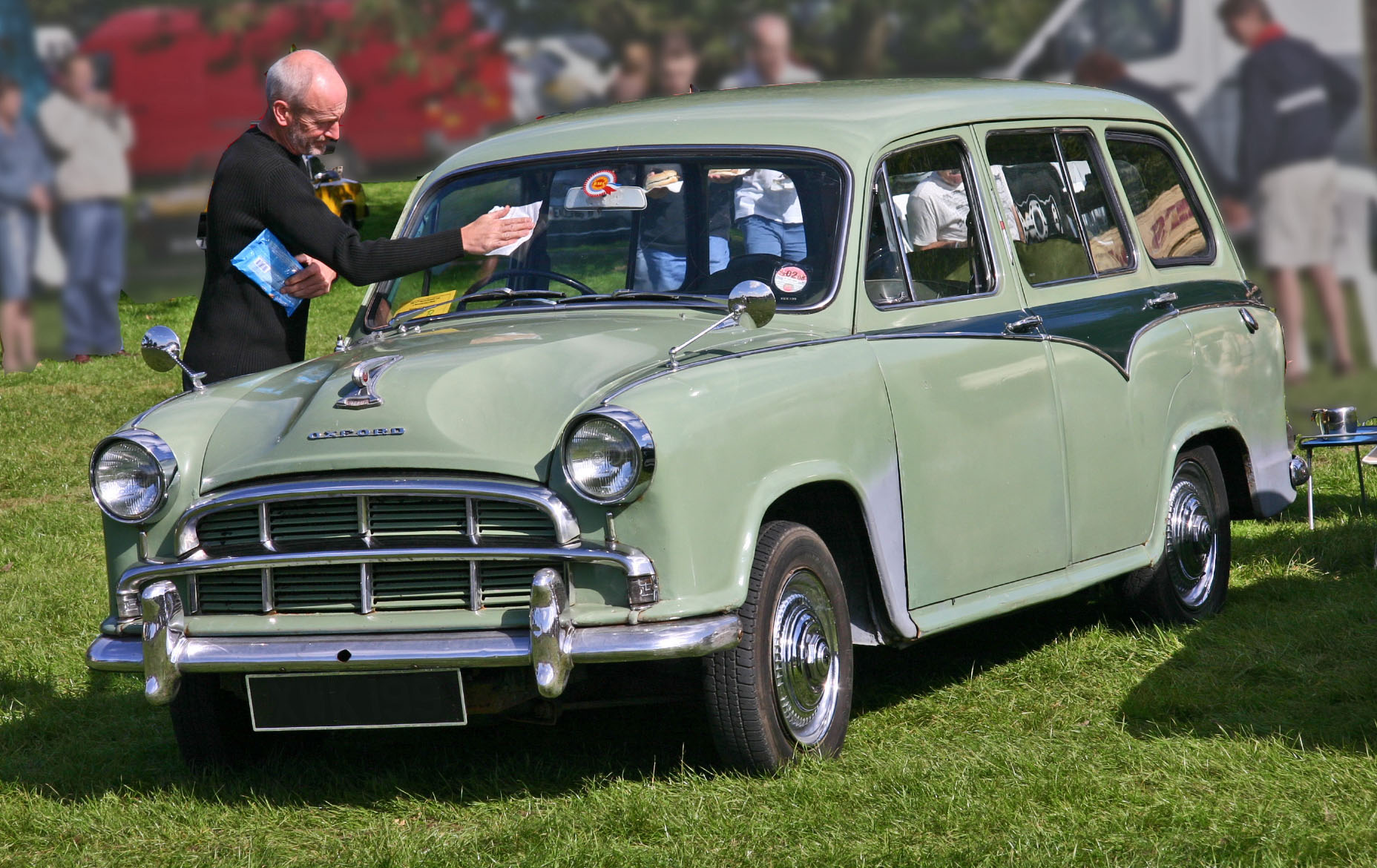
- Oxford Traveller all-steel estate

Overview
- Production: 1957–1960; 58,117 produced inc Series III

Body and chassis
- Body style: 4-door estate

Powertrain
- Engine: 1489 cc BMC B-Series engine Straight-4

Dimensions
- Wheelbase: 97 in (2,500 mm)
- Length: 171 in (4,300 mm)
- Width: 65 in (1,700 mm)

Chronology
- Predecessor: Morris Oxford Series II
- Successor: Morris Oxford Series V

The Oxford IV was only made in the Traveller estate version. A steel-bodied replacement for the "woody" Series III Traveller, it was similar to the Series III saloon in most respects. The IV was introduced in 1957, announced by BMC with the Riley Two-Point-Six on 23 August 1957 and produced alongside the Series V until 1960. An interesting feature was having fillers on both sides of the car, for the single fuel tank.

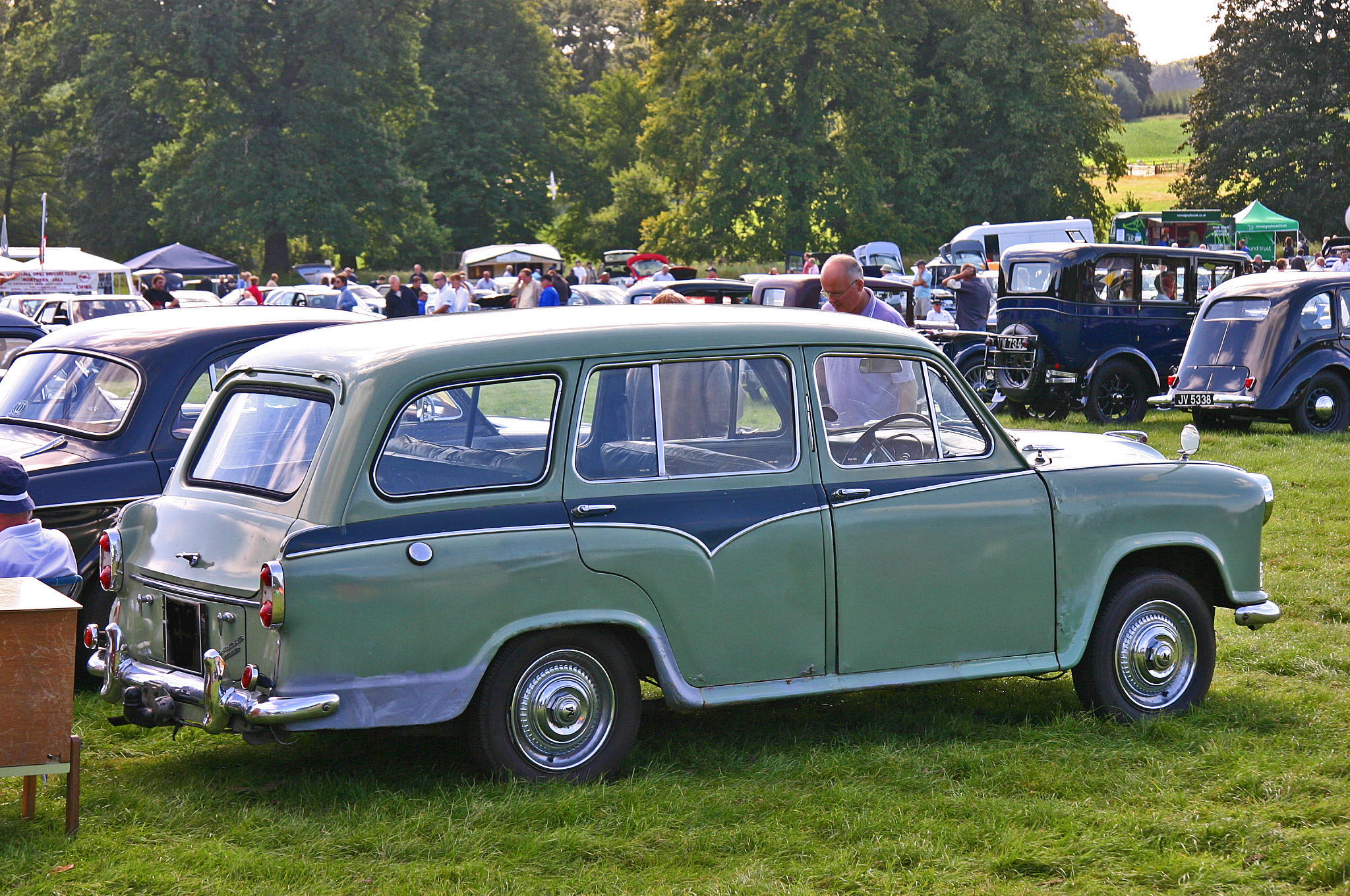
Oxford Traveller estate
