= Morris Oxford Series II =

Morris Oxford
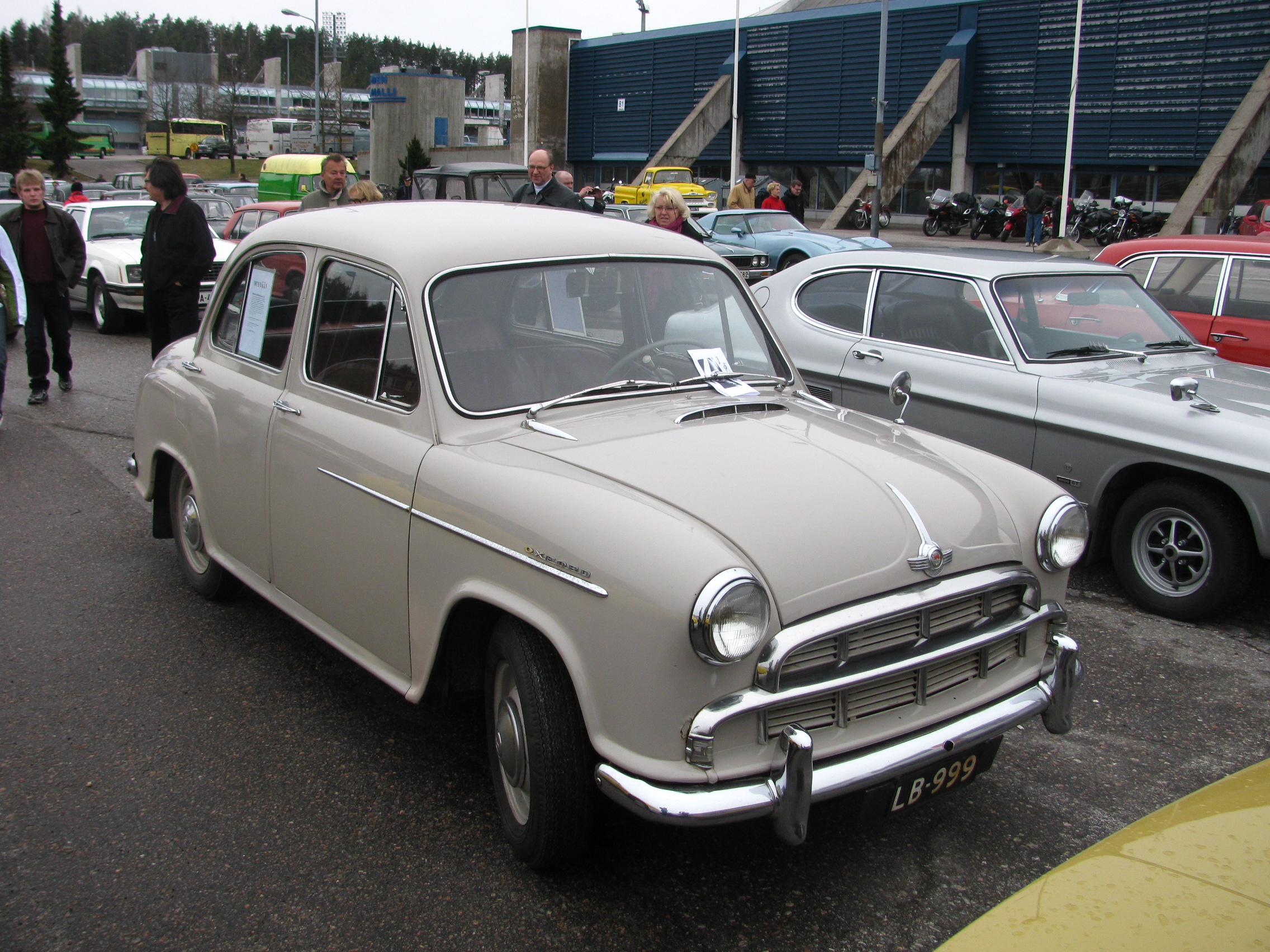
- Oxford Series II saloon in Finland

Overview
- Manufacturer: Morris Motors; British Motor Corporation; British Leyland
- Production: 1913–1914; 1919–1935; 1948–1971

Body and chassis
- Class: Small family car

Morris Oxford is a series of motor car models produced by Morris Motors of the United Kingdom, from the 1913 bullnose Oxford to the Farina Oxfords V and VI.

Named by W R Morris after the city of dreaming spires, the university town in which he grew up, the manufacture of Morris's Oxford cars would turn Oxford into an industrial city.

From 1913 to mid-1935 Oxford cars grew in size and quantity. In 1923 they with the Cowley cars were 28.1 per cent of British private car production. In 1925 Morris sold near double the number and they represented 41 per cent of British production. The model name was recycled in 1948 and lasted almost another 23 years through to 1971 but in this time the market sector and engine-size remained nearly constant between 1476 cc and 1622 cc.

Aside from the Oxford Sixes and the Oxford Empire models all Oxfords since 1918 have been 12 or 14 HP cars of about 1500 to 1800 cc..

== Oxford Series II (1954–1956) ==
Oxford II
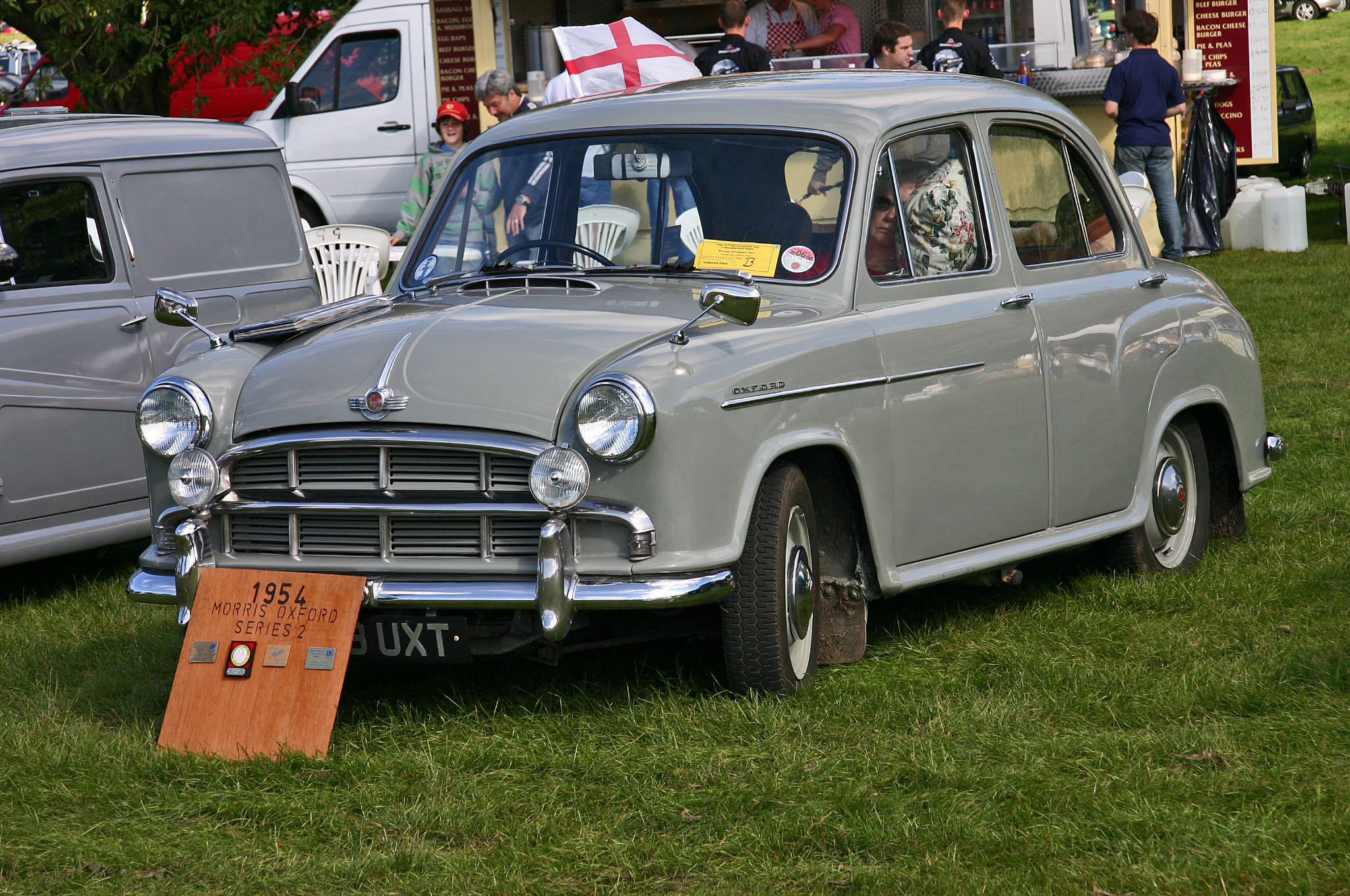
- Oxford saloon Series II 1954

Overview
- Production: 1954–1956; 87,341 produced
- Assembly: United Kingdom; Australia

Body and chassis
- Body style: 4-door saloon 2-door estate 2-door pick-up
- Related: Morris Cowley

Powertrain
- Engine: 1489 cc B-Series Straight-4

Dimensions
- Wheelbase: 97 in (2,500 mm)
- Length: 171 in (4,300 mm)
- Width: 65 in (1,700 mm)
- Height: 63 in (1,600 mm)

Chronology
- Predecessor: Morris Oxford MO
- Successor: Morris Oxford Series III

The fully redesigned Oxford was announced in May 1954, and following the formation of BMC, notably received the Austin-designed B-Series OHV straight-4. This modern 1.5 L (1489 cc/90 in^{3}) engine produced a respectable 50 hp (37 kW) and allowed the Oxford to reach 74 mph (119 km/h). Hydraulic drum brakes all round were still used but increased to 9-inch (230 mm) diameter. Steering was still of the beautifully light and precise rack and pinion type.

== Traveller ==
Styling was entirely new though the rounded body maintained a family resemblance to the Morris Minor. Again, a pair of four-seat configurations, 4-door saloon and 2-door Traveller, were offered. The column gear change and front bench seat allowed the saloon to be advertised as a full six-seater. The handbrake lever was located between the side of the seat and the driver's side door. Unusually for a British car of its class at the time, the heater was a standard fitting but the radio remained an extra. Sales remained strong when the Series III arrived in 1956.

The British Motor magazine tested a Series II saloon in 1954 recording a top speed of 74.2 mph (119.4 km/h) and acceleration from 0–60 mph (97 km/h) in 28.9 seconds and a fuel consumption of 28.2 miles per imperial gallon (10.0 L/100 km; 23.5 mpg_{‑US}). The test car cost £744 including taxes.

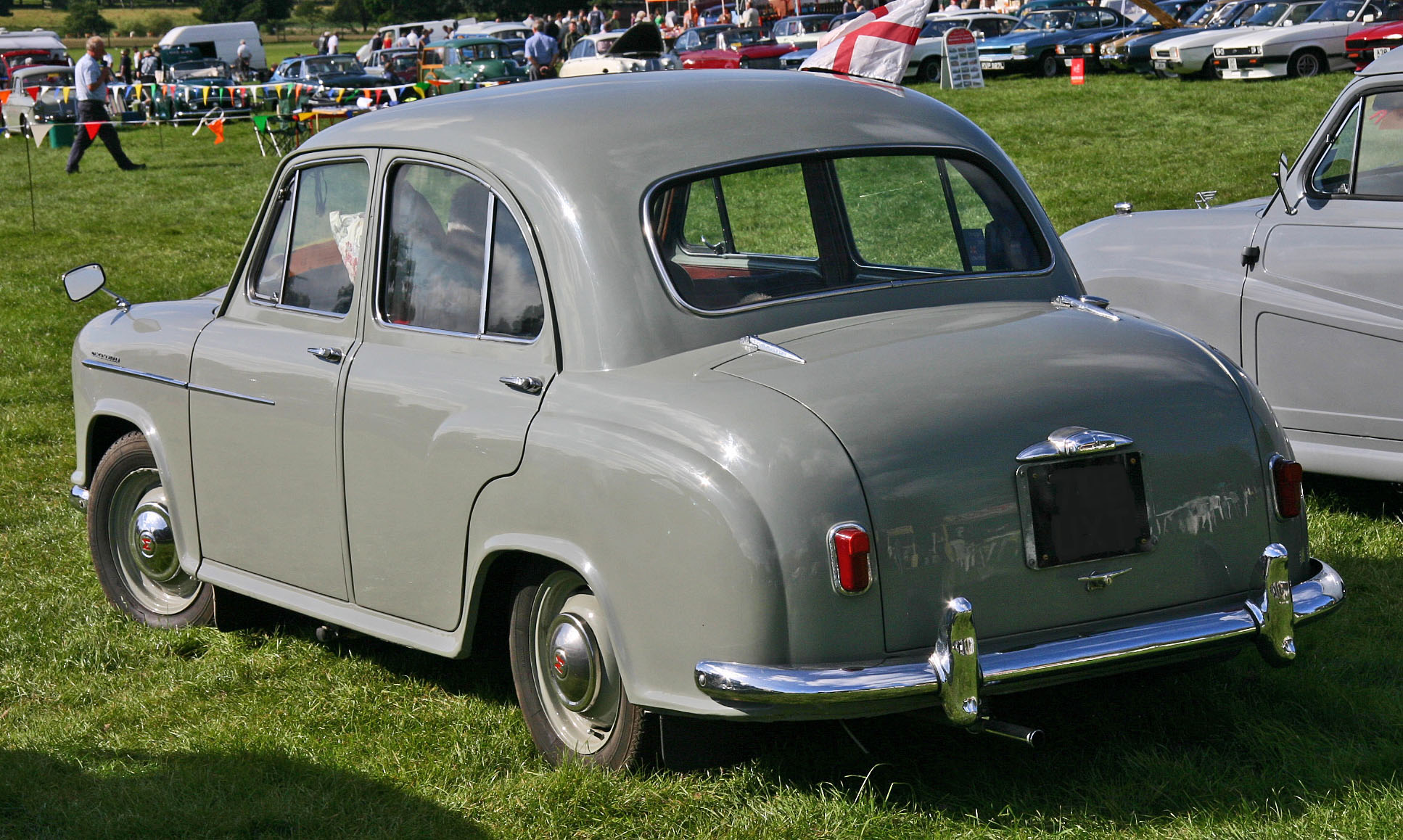
Oxford saloon 1954

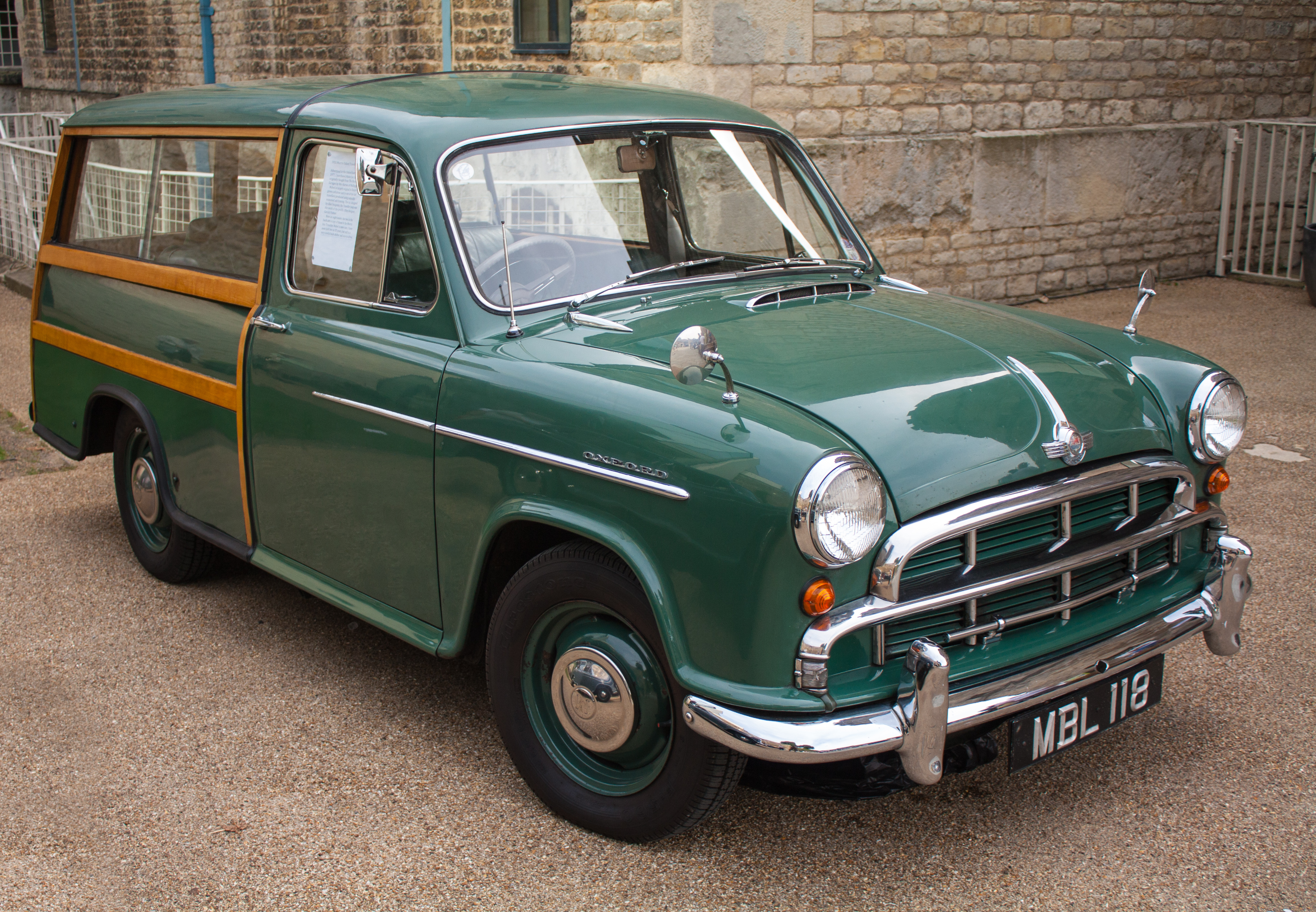
Oxford Traveller 1955

== Isis ==
A 2.6-litre six-cylinder 7-inches longer Morris Isis version was announced 12 July 1955 with a saloon or Traveller estate body: the rear half of the Traveller body used the same timber-frame ("half-timbered") construction as that used for the better remembered Morris Minor Traveller.

== Hindustan Landmaster ==
Hindustan Motors of India produced the four-cylinder version of this car (except the air-vent situated upon the bonnet) naming it Hindustan Landmaster.
